= List of human spaceflights, 2001–2010 =

This is a detailed list of human spaceflights from 2001 to 2010, including the first full era of the International Space Station, first Shenzhou flights and first commercial space flights.

- Red indicates fatalities.
- Green indicates a suborbital flight.

| # | Crew | Launch spacecraft | Habitation | Return spacecraft | Brief mission summary |
|---|---|---|---|---|---|
| 224 | (United States) Kenneth D. Cockrell (4) (United States) Mark L. Polansky (1) (United States) Robert L. Curbeam (2) (United States) Marsha S. Ivins (5) (United States) Thomas D. Jones (4) | 7 February 2001 (United States) STS-98, Atlantis | ISS | 20 February 2001 (United States) STS-98, Atlantis | ISS assembly and supply. Delivery of Destiny Laboratory Module. |
| 225 | (United States) James D. Wetherbee (5) (United States) James M. Kelly (1) (United States) Andrew S. W. Thomas (3) (United States) Paul W. Richards | 8 March 2001 (United States) STS-102, Discovery | ISS | 21 March 2001 (United States) STS-102, Discovery | ISS crew rotation, outfitting and resupply. |
| 225 | (Russia) Yury Usachev (4) (United States) James S. Voss (5) (United States) Susan Helms (5) | 8 March 2001 (United States) STS-102, Discovery | ISS (crew 2) | 22 August 2001 (United States) STS-105, Discovery | ISS crew rotation, outfitting and resupply. |
| 226 | (United States) Kent V. Rominger (5) (United States) Jeffrey S. Ashby (2) (United States) Scott E. Parazynski (4) (United States) John L. Phillips (1) (Canada) Chris A. Hadfield (2) (Italy) Umberto Guidoni (2) (Russia) Yuri Lonchakov (1) | 19 April 2001 (United States) STS-100, Endeavour | ISS | 1 May 2001 (United States) STS-100, Endeavour | ISS supply and assembly: delivery of Canadarm2 robotic arm. First European on board ISS (Guidoni). First Canadian EVA (Hadfield). |
| 227 | (Russia) Talgat Musabayev (3) (Russia) Yuri Baturin (2) (United States) Dennis A. Tito | 29 April 2001 (Russia) Soyuz TM-32 | ISS | 5 May 2001 (Russia) Soyuz TM-31 | First paying space tourist (Tito). |
| 228 | (United States) Steven W. Lindsey (3) (United States) Charles O. Hobaugh (1) (United States) Michael L. Gernhardt (4) (United States) James F. Reilly (2) (United States) Janet L. Kavandi (3) | 12 July 2001 (United States) STS-104, Atlantis | ISS | 24 July 2001 (United States) STS-104, Atlantis | ISS assembly and maintenance: delivery of Quest Airlock |
| 229 | (United States) Scott J. Horowitz (4) (United States) Frederick W. Sturckow (2) (United States) Daniel T. Barry (3) (United States) Patrick G. Forrester (1) | 10 August 2001 (United States) STS-105, Discovery | ISS | 22 August 2001 (United States) STS-105, Discovery | ISS crew rotation, assembly and supply. |
| 229 | (United States) Frank L. Culbertson (3) (Russia) Vladimir Dezhurov (2) (Russia) Mikhail Tyurin (1) | 10 August 2001 (United States) STS-105, Discovery | ISS (crew 3) | 17 December 2001 (United States) STS-108, Endeavour | ISS crew rotation, assembly and supply. |
| 230 | (Russia) Viktor Mikhaylovich Afanasyev (4) (Russia) Konstantin Kozeyev (France) Claudie Haigneré (2) | 21 October 2001 (Russia) Soyuz TM-33 | ISS | 31 October 2001 (Russia) Soyuz TM-32 | |
| 231 | (United States) Dominic L. Pudwill Gorie (3) (United States) Mark Kelly (1) (United States) Linda M. Godwin (4) (United States) Daniel M. Tani (1) | 5 December 2001 (United States) STS-108, Endeavour | ISS | 17 December 2001 (United States) STS-108, Endeavour | ISS crew rotation, assembly and supply. |
| 231 | (Russia) Yuri Onufrienko (2) (United States) Carl E. Walz (4) (United States) Daniel W. Bursch (4) | 5 December 2001 (United States) STS-108, Endeavour | ISS (crew 4) | 19 June 2002 (United States) STS-111, Endeavour | ISS crew rotation, assembly and supply. |
| 232 | (United States) Scott D. Altman (3) (United States) Duane G. Carey (United States) John M. Grunsfeld (4) (United States) Nancy J. Sherlock Currie (4) (United States) James H. Newman (4) (United States) Richard M. Linnehan (3) (United States) Michael J. Massimino (1) | 1 March 2002 (United States) STS-109, Columbia | | 12 March 2002 (United States) STS-109, Columbia | Hubble Space Telescope servicing mission. |
| 233 | (United States) Michael J. Bloomfield (3) (United States) Stephen N. Frick (1) (United States) Jerry L. Ross (7) (United States) Steven L. Smith (4) (United States) Ellen L. Ochoa (4) (United States) Lee Morin (1) (United States) Rex J. Walheim (1) | 8 April 2002 (United States) STS-110, Atlantis | ISS | 19 April 2002 (United States) STS-110, Atlantis | ISS assembly and supply. |
| 234 | (Russia) Yuri Gidzenko (3) (Italy) Roberto Vittori (1) (South Africa) Mark Shuttleworth | 25 April 2002 (Russia) Soyuz TM-34 | ISS | 5 May 2002 (Russia) Soyuz TM-33 | First South African in space (Shuttleworth). Second space tourist (Shuttleworth). |
| 235 | (United States) Kenneth D. Cockrell (5) (United States) Paul S. Lockhart (1) (United States) Franklin R. Chang-Diaz (7) (France) Philippe Perrin | 5 June 2002 (United States) STS-111, Endeavour | ISS | 19 June 2002 (United States) STS-111, Endeavour | ISS crew rotation, assembly and supply. |
| 235 | (Russia) Valeri Korzun (2) (Russia) Sergei Treshchev (United States) Peggy A. Whitson (1) | 5 June 2002 (United States) STS-111, Endeavour | ISS (crew 5) | 7 December 2002 (United States) STS-113, Endeavour | ISS crew rotation, assembly and supply. |
| 236 | (United States) Jeffrey S. Ashby (3) (United States) Pamela A. Melroy (2) (United States) David A. Wolf (3) (United States) Piers J. Sellers (1) (United States) Sandra H. Magnus (1) (Russia) Fyodor Yurchikhin (1) | 7 October 2002 (United States) STS-112, Atlantis | ISS | 18 October 2002 (United States) STS-112, Atlantis | ISS assembly, maintenance and supply. |
| 237 | (Russia) Sergei Zalyotin (2) (Russia) Yuri Lonchakov (2) (Belgium) Frank De Winne (1) | 29 October 2002 (Russia) Soyuz TMA-1 | ISS | 10 November 2002 (Russia) Soyuz TM-34 | |
| 238 | (United States) James D. Wetherbee (6) (United States) Paul S. Lockhart (2) (United States) Michael E. Lopez-Alegria (3) (United States) John B. Herrington | 23 November 2002 (United States) STS-113, Endeavour | ISS | 7 December 2002 (United States) STS-113, Endeavour | ISS assembly, crew rotation and supply. |
| 238 | (United States) Kenneth D. Bowersox (5) (United States) Donald R. Pettit (1) (Russia) Nikolai Budarin (3) | 23 November 2002 (United States) STS-113, Endeavour | ISS (crew 6) | 4 May 2003 (Russia) Soyuz TMA-1 | ISS assembly, crew rotation and supply. |
| 239 | (United States) Rick D. Husband (2) (United States) William C. McCool (United States) David M. Brown (United States) Kalpana Chawla (2) (United States) Michael P. Anderson (2) (United States) Laurel B. Clark (Israel) Ilan Ramon | 16 January 2003 (United States) STS-107, Columbia | | 1 February 2003 (United States) STS-107, Columbia | Microgravity and Earth science research. First Israeli in space (Ramon). Broke up during re-entry with loss of all crew. |
| 240 | (Russia) Yuri Malenchenko (3) (United States) Edward T. Lu (3) | 25 April 2003 (Russia) Soyuz TMA-2 | ISS (crew 7) | 27 October 2003 (Russia) Soyuz TMA-2 | ISS crew rotation. |
| 241 | (China) Yang Liwei | 15 October 2003 (China) Shenzhou 5 | | | First human spaceflight of the People's Republic of China. |
| 242 | (Spain) Pedro Duque (2) | 18 October 2003 (Russia) Soyuz TMA-3 | ISS | 27 October 2003 (Russia) Soyuz TMA-2 | ISS crew rotation. |
| 242 | (Russia) Aleksandr Kaleri (4) (United States) C. Michael Foale (6) | 18 October 2003 (Russia) Soyuz TMA-3 | ISS (crew 8) | 29 April 2004 (Russia) Soyuz TMA-3 | ISS crew rotation. |
| 243 | (Netherlands) André Kuipers (1) | 19 April 2004 (Russia) Soyuz TMA-4 | ISS | 29 April 2004 (Russia) Soyuz TMA-3 | ISS crew rotation. |
| 243 | (Russia) Gennady Padalka (2) (United States) E. Michael Fincke (1) | 19 April 2004 (Russia) Soyuz TMA-4 | ISS (crew 9) | 24 October 2004 (Russia) Soyuz TMA-4 | ISS crew rotation. |
| 244 | (United States) Michael W. Melvill (1) | 21 June 2004 (United States) Flight 15P, SpaceShipOne | | | First human spaceflight of commercial spaceship. |
| 245 | (United States) Michael W. Melvill (2) | 29 September 2004 (United States) Flight 16P, SpaceShipOne | | | Ansari X Prize flight #1. |
| 246 | (United States) W. Brian Binnie | 4 October 2004 (United States) Flight 17P, SpaceShipOne | | | Ansari X Prize flight #2, winning the prize. |
| 247 | (Russia) Yuri Shargin | 14 October 2004 (Russia) Soyuz TMA-5 | ISS | 24 October 2004 (Russia) Soyuz TMA-4 | ISS crew rotation. |
| 247 | (Russia) Salizhan Sharipov (2) (United States) Leroy Chiao (4) | 14 October 2004 (Russia) Soyuz TMA-5 | ISS (crew 10) | 24 April 2005 (Russia) Soyuz TMA-5 | ISS crew rotation. |
| 248 | (Italy) Roberto Vittori (2) | 15 April 2005 (Russia) Soyuz TMA-6 | ISS | 24 April 2005 (Russia) Soyuz TMA-5 | ISS crew rotation. |
| 248 | (Russia) Sergei Krikalev (6) (United States) John L. Phillips (2) | 15 April 2005 (Russia) Soyuz TMA-6 | ISS (crew 11) | 11 October 2005 (Russia) Soyuz TMA-6 | ISS crew rotation. |
| 249 | (United States) Eileen M. Collins (4) (United States) James M. Kelly (2) (United States) Stephen K. Robinson (3) (United States) Andrew S. W. Thomas (4) (United States) Wendy B. Lawrence (4) (United States) Charles J. Camarda (Japan) Soichi Noguchi (1) | 26 July 2005 (United States) STS-114, Discovery | ISS | 9 August 2005 (United States) STS-114, Discovery | First "Return to Flight" Space Shuttle mission after the loss of Columbia. ISS assembly and supply. |
| 250 | (United States) Gregory H. Olsen | 1 October 2005 (Russia) Soyuz TMA-7 | ISS | 11 October 2005 (Russia) Soyuz TMA-6 | ISS crew rotation. Third space tourist (Olsen). |
| 250 | (Russia) Valery Tokarev (2) (United States) William S. McArthur (4) | 1 October 2005 (Russia) Soyuz TMA-7 | ISS (crew 12) | 8 April 2006 (Russia) Soyuz TMA-7 | ISS crew rotation. Third space tourist (Olsen). |
| 251 | (China) Fèi Jùnlóng (1) (China) Niè Hǎishèng (1) | 12 October 2005 (China) Shenzhou 6 | | 16 October 2005 (China) Shenzhou 6 | Second human spaceflight of the People's Republic of China. |
| 252 | (Brazil) Marcos Pontes | 30 March 2006 (Russia) Soyuz TMA-8 | ISS (MC) | 8 April 2006 (Russia) Soyuz TMA-7 | ISS crew rotation. First Brazilian in space (Pontes). |
| 252 | (Russia) Pavel Vinogradov (2) (United States) Jeffrey N. Williams (2) | 30 March 2006 (Russia) Soyuz TMA-8 | ISS (crew 13) | 29 September 2006 (Russia) Soyuz TMA-8 | ISS crew rotation. First Brazilian in space (Pontes). |
| 253 | (United States) Steven W. Lindsey (4) (United States) Mark Kelly (2) (United States) Michael E. Fossum (1) (United States) Piers J. Sellers (2) (United States) Lisa M. Nowak (United States) Stephanie D. Wilson (1) | 4 July 2006 (United States) STS-121, Discovery | ISS | 17 July 2006 (United States) STS-121, Discovery | ISS crew rotation and supply. Safety and repair system testing. First long-duration ISS mission by an ESA astronaut (Reiter). |
| 253 | (Germany) Thomas Reiter (2) | 4 July 2006 (United States) STS-121, Discovery | ISS (crew 13/14) | 22 December 2006 (United States) STS-116, Discovery | ISS crew rotation and supply. Safety and repair system testing. First long-duration ISS mission by an ESA astronaut (Reiter). |
| 254 | (United States) Brent W. Jett (4) (United States) Christopher J. Ferguson (1) (United States) Joseph R. Tanner (4) (United States) Daniel C. Burbank (2) (United States) Heidemarie M. Stefanyshyn-Piper (1) (Canada) Steven G. MacLean (2) | 9 September 2006 (United States) STS-115, Atlantis | ISS | 21 September 2006 (United States) STS-115, Atlantis | Resumption of ISS assembly. First Canadian to operate Canadarm2. Delivery of the second set of solar arrays and batteries. |
| 255 | (United States) Anousheh Ansari | 18 September 2006 (Russia) Soyuz TMA-9 | ISS | 29 September 2006 (Russia) Soyuz TMA-8 | ISS crew rotation. First female space tourist (Ansari). First Persian in space (Ansari). |
| 255 | (Russia) Mikhail Tyurin (2) (United States) Michael E. Lopez-Alegria (4) | 18 September 2006 (Russia) Soyuz TMA-9 | ISS (crew 14) | 21 April 2007 (Russia) Soyuz TMA-9 | ISS crew rotation. First female space tourist (Ansari). First Persian in space (Ansari). |
| 256 | (United States) Mark L. Polansky (2) (United States) William A. Oefelein (United States) Robert L. Curbeam (3) (United States) Joan E. Higginbotham (United States) Nicholas J.M. Patrick (1) (Sweden) Christer Fuglesang (1) | 10 December 2006 (United States) STS-116, Discovery | ISS | 22 December 2006 (United States) STS-116, Discovery | ISS crew rotation and assembly First Swede in space (Fuglesang) |
| 256 | (United States) Sunita L. Williams (1) | 10 December 2006 (United States) STS-116, Discovery | ISS (crew 14/15) | 22 June 2007 (United States) STS-117, Atlantis | ISS crew rotation and assembly First Swede in space (Fuglesang) |
| 257 | (Hungary) (United States) Charles Simonyi (1) | 7 April 2007 (Russia) Soyuz TMA-10 | ISS | 21 April 2007 (Russia) Soyuz TMA-9 | ISS crew rotation. Space tourist flight. (Fifth space tourist and the second Hungarian, Simonyi, in space) |
| 257 | (Russia) Oleg Kotov (1) (Russia) Fyodor Yurchikhin (2) | 7 April 2007 (Russia) Soyuz TMA-10 | ISS (crew 15) | 21 October 2007 (Russia) Soyuz TMA-10 | ISS crew rotation. Space tourist flight. (Fifth space tourist and the second Hungarian, Simonyi, in space) |
| 258 | (United States) Frederick W. Sturckow (3) (United States) Lee J. Archambault (1) (United States) Patrick G. Forrester (2) (United States) Steven R. Swanson (1) (United States) John D. Olivas (1) (United States) James F. Reilly (3) | 8 June 2007 (United States) STS-117, Atlantis | ISS | 22 June 2007 (United States) STS-117, Atlantis | ISS crew rotation and assembly |
| 258 | (United States) Clayton C. Anderson (1) | 8 June 2007 (United States) STS-117, Atlantis | ISS (crew 15/16) | 7 November 2007 (United States) STS-120, Discovery | ISS crew rotation and assembly |
| 259 | (United States) Scott Kelly (2) (United States) Charles O. Hobaugh (2) (United States) Tracy E. Caldwell Dyson (1) (United States) Richard A. Mastracchio (2) (United States) Barbara R. Morgan (United States) Benjamin A. Drew (1) (Canada) Dafydd R. Williams (2) | 8 August 2007 (United States) STS-118, Endeavour | ISS | 21 August 2007 (United States) STS-118, Endeavour | ISS assembly |
| 260 | (Malaysia) Sheikh Muszaphar Shukor | 10 October 2007 (Russia) Soyuz TMA-11 | ISS | 21 October 2007 (Russia) Soyuz TMA-10 | ISS crew rotation. First Malaysian in space (Shukor). First female ISS commander (Whitson). |
| 260 | (Russia) Yuri Malenchenko (4) (United States) Peggy A. Whitson (2) | 10 October 2007 (Russia) Soyuz TMA-11 | ISS (crew 16) | 19 April 2008 (Russia) Soyuz TMA-11 | ISS crew rotation. First Malaysian in space (Shukor). First female ISS commander (Whitson). |
| 261 | (United States) Pamela A. Melroy (3) (United States) George D. Zamka (1) (United States) Scott E. Parazynski (5) (United States) Stephanie D. Wilson (2) (United States) Douglas H. Wheelock (1) (Italy) Paolo Nespoli (1) | 23 October 2007 (United States) STS-120, Discovery | ISS | 7 November 2007 (United States) STS-120, Discovery | ISS crew rotation and assembly |
| 261 | (United States) Daniel M. Tani (2) | 23 October 2007 (United States) STS-120, Discovery | ISS (crew 16) | 20 February 2008 (United States) STS-122, Atlantis | ISS crew rotation and assembly |
| 262 | (United States) Stephen N. Frick (2) (United States) Alan G. Poindexter (1) (United States) Leland D. Melvin (1) (United States) Rex J. Walheim (2) (United States) Stanley G. Love (Germany) Hans Schlegel (2) | 7 February 2008 (United States) STS-122, Atlantis | ISS | 20 February 2008 (United States) STS-122, Atlantis | ISS crew rotation and assembly |
| 262 | (France) Léopold Eyharts (2) | 7 February 2008 (United States) STS-122, Atlantis | ISS (crew 16) | 27 March 2008 (United States) STS-123, Endeavour | ISS crew rotation and assembly |
| 263 | (United States) Dominic L. Pudwill Gorie (4) (United States) Gregory H. Johnson (1) (United States) Robert L. Behnken (1) (United States) Michael J. Foreman (1) (United States) Richard M. Linnehan (4) (Japan) Takao Doi (2) | 11 March 2008 (United States) STS-123, Endeavour | ISS | 27 March 2008 (United States) STS-123, Endeavour | ISS crew rotation and assembly |
| 263 | (United States) Garrett E. Reisman (1) | 11 March 2008 (United States) STS-123, Endeavour | ISS (crew 16/17) | 14 June 2008 (United States) STS-124, Discovery | ISS crew rotation and assembly |
| 264 | (South Korea) Yi So-yeon | 8 April 2008 (Russia) Soyuz TMA-12 | ISS | 19 April 2008 (Russia) Soyuz TMA-11 | ISS crew rotation. First South Korean in space (Yi); First second-generation cosmonaut (Volkov). |
| 264 | (Russia) Sergey Volkov (1) (Russia) Oleg Kononenko (1) | 8 April 2008 (Russia) Soyuz TMA-12 | ISS (crew 17) | 24 October 2008 (Russia) Soyuz TMA-12 | ISS crew rotation. First South Korean in space (Yi); First second-generation cosmonaut (Volkov). |
| 265 | (United States) Mark Kelly (3) (United States) Kenneth T. Ham (1) (United States) Karen L. Nyberg (1) (United States) Ronald J. Garan (1) (United States) Michael E. Fossum (2) (Japan) Akihiko Hoshide (1) | 31 May 2008 (United States) STS-124, Discovery | ISS | 14 June 2008 (United States) STS-124, Discovery | ISS assembly and crew rotation Delivery of Kibo Japanese Experiment Module |
| 265 | (United States) Gregory E. Chamitoff (1) | 31 May 2008 (United States) STS-124, Discovery | ISS (crew 17/18) | 30 November 2008 (United States) STS-126, Endeavour | ISS assembly and crew rotation Delivery of Kibo Japanese Experiment Module |
| 266 | (China) Zhai Zhigang (1) (China) Liu Boming (1) (China) Jing Haipeng (1) | 25 September 2008 (China) Shenzhou 7 | | 28 September 2008 (China) Shenzhou 7 | Third human spaceflight and first spacewalk for China. |
| 267 | (United States) Richard A. Garriot | 12 October 2008 (Russia) Soyuz TMA-13 | ISS | 24 October 2008 (Russia) Soyuz TMA-12 | ISS crew rotation. |
| 267 | (Russia) Yuri Lonchakov (3) (United States) E. Michael Fincke (2) | 12 October 2008 (Russia) Soyuz TMA-13 | ISS (crew 18) | 8 April 2009 (Russia) Soyuz TMA-13 | ISS crew rotation. |
| 268 | (United States) Christopher J. Ferguson (2) (United States) Eric A. Boe (1) (United States) Donald R. Pettit (2) (United States) Stephen G. Bowen (1) (United States) Heidemarie M. Stefanyshyn-Piper (2) (United States) Robert S. Kimbrough (1) | 15 November 2008 (United States) STS-126, Endeavour | ISS | 30 November 2008 (United States) STS-126, Endeavour | ISS logistics and crew rotation |
| 268 | (United States) Sandra H. Magnus (2) | 15 November 2008 (United States) STS-126, Endeavour | ISS (crew 18) | 29 March 2009 (United States) STS-119, Discovery | ISS logistics and crew rotation |
| 269 | (United States) Lee J. Archambault (2) (United States) Dominic A. Antonelli (1) (United States) Joseph M. Acaba (1) (United States) Steven R. Swanson (2) (United States) Richard R. Arnold (1) (United States) John L. Phillips (3) | 15 March 2009 (United States) STS-119, Discovery | ISS | 29 March 2009 (United States) STS-119, Discovery | Delivery of final solar power generation module and crew rotation |
| 269 | (Japan) Koichi Wakata (3) | 15 March 2009 (United States) STS-119, Discovery | ISS (crew 18/19/20) | 31 July 2009 (United States) STS-127, Endeavour | Delivery of final solar power generation module and crew rotation |
| 270 | (Hungary) (United States) Charles Simonyi (2) | 26 March 2009 (Russia) Soyuz TMA-14 | ISS | 8 April 2009 (Russia) Soyuz TMA-13 | ISS crew rotation. |
| 270 | (Russia) Gennady Padalka (3) (United States) Michael R. Barratt (1) | 26 March 2009 (Russia) Soyuz TMA-14 | ISS (crew 19/20) | 11 October 2009 (Russia) Soyuz TMA-14 | ISS crew rotation. |
| 271 | (United States) Scott D. Altman (4) (United States) Gregory C. Johnson (United States) Michael T. Good (1) (United States) K. Megan McArthur (1) (United States) John M. Grunsfeld (5) (United States) Michael J. Massimino (2) (United States) Andrew J. Feustel (1) | 11 May 2009 (United States) STS-125, Atlantis | | 24 May 2009 (United States) STS-125, Atlantis | Hubble Space Telescope Servicing Mission 4 |
| 272 | (Russia) Roman Romanenko (1) (Belgium) Frank De Winne (2) (Canada) Robert Thirsk (2) | 27 May 2009 (Russia) Soyuz TMA-15 | ISS (crew 20/21) | 1 December 2009 (Russia) Soyuz TMA-15 | ISS crew rotation. |
| 273 | (United States) Mark L. Polansky (3) (United States) Douglas G. Hurley (1) (United States) Christopher J. Cassidy (1) (United States) Thomas H. Marshburn (1) (United States) David A. Wolf (4) (Canada) Julie Payette (2) | 15 July 2009 (United States) STS-127, Endeavour | ISS | 31 July 2009 (United States) STS-127, Endeavour | Delivery of Japanese exposed facility and crew rotation |
| 273 | (United States) Timothy L. Kopra (1) | 15 July 2009 (United States) STS-127, Endeavour | ISS (crew 20) | 11 September 2009 (United States) STS-128, Discovery | Delivery of Japanese exposed facility and crew rotation |
| 274 | (United States) Frederick W. Sturckow (4) (United States) Kevin A. Ford (1) (United States) Patrick G. Forrester (3) (United States) José M. Hernández (United States) John D. Olivas (2) (Sweden) Christer Fuglesang (2) | 28 August 2009 (United States) STS-128, Discovery | ISS | 11 September 2009 (United States) STS-128, Discovery | Delivery of experiments, logistics, and crew rotation |
| 274 | (United States) Nicole P. Stott (1) | 28 August 2009 (United States) STS-128, Discovery | ISS (crew 20/21) | 27 November 2009 (United States) STS-129, Atlantis | Delivery of experiments, logistics, and crew rotation |
| 275 | (Canada) Guy Laliberté | 30 September 2009 (Russia) Soyuz TMA-16 | ISS | 11 October 2009 (Russia) Soyuz TMA-14 | First Canadian space tourist, ISS crew rotation. |
| 275 | (Russia) Maksim Surayev (1) (United States) Jeffrey N. Williams (3) | 30 September 2009 (Russia) Soyuz TMA-16 | ISS (crew 21/22) | 18 March 2010 (Russia) Soyuz TMA-16 | First Canadian space tourist, ISS crew rotation. |
| 276 | (United States) Charles O. Hobaugh (3) (United States) Barry E. Wilmore (1) (United States) Leland D. Melvin (2) (United States) Randolph J. Bresnik (1) (United States) Michael J. Foreman (2) (United States) Robert L. Satcher | 16 November 2009 (United States) STS-129, Atlantis | ISS | 27 November 2009 (United States) STS-129, Atlantis | ISS assembly Delivery of ELC1 and ELC2 |
| 277 | (Russia) Oleg Kotov (2) (United States) Timothy J. Creamer (Japan) Soichi Noguchi (2) | 20 December 2009 (Russia) Soyuz TMA-17 | ISS (crew 22/23) | 2 June 2010 (Russia) Soyuz TMA-17 | ISS crew rotation. |
| 278 | (United States) George D. Zamka (2) (United States) Terry W. Virts (1) (United States) Kathryn P. Hire (2) (United States) Stephen K. Robinson (4) (United States) Nicolas J.M. Patrick (2) (United States) Robert L. Behnken (2) | 8 February 2010 (United States) STS-130, Endeavour | ISS | 22 February 2010 (United States) STS-130, Endeavour | ISS assembly Delivery of Tranquility and Cupola |
| 279 | (Russia) Aleksandr Skvortsov (1) (Russia) Mikhail Korniyenko (1) (United States) Tracy E. Caldwell Dyson (2) | 2 April 2010 (Russia) Soyuz TMA-18 | ISS (crew 23/24) | 25 September 2010 (Russia) Soyuz TMA-18 | ISS crew rotation. |
| 280 | (United States) Alan G. Poindexter (2) (United States) James P. Dutton (United States) Richard A. Mastracchio (3) (United States) Clayton C. Anderson (2) (United States) Dorothy M. Metcalf-Lindenburger (United States) Stephanie D. Wilson (3) (Japan) Naoko Yamazaki | 5 April 2010 (United States) STS-131, Discovery | ISS | 20 April 2010 (United States) STS-131, Discovery | ISS assembly Delivery of experiments and logistics |
| 281 | (United States) Kenneth T. Ham (2) (United States) Dominic A. Antonelli (2) (United States) Garrett E. Reisman (2) (United States) Michael T. Good (2) (United States) Stephen G. Bowen (2) (United States) Piers J. Sellers (3) | 14 May 2010 (United States) STS-132, Atlantis | ISS | 26 May 2010 (United States) STS-132, Atlantis | Delivery of experiments Delivery of Rassvet |
| 282 | (Russia) Fyodor Yurchikhin (3) (United States) Shannon Walker (1) (United States) Douglas H. Wheelock (2) | 15 June 2010 (Russia) Soyuz TMA-19 | ISS (crew 24/25) | 26 November 2010 (Russia) Soyuz TMA-19 | ISS crew rotation. |
| 283 | (Russia) Aleksandr Kaleri (5) (Russia) Oleg Skripochka (1) (United States) Scott Kelly (3) | 7 October 2010 (Russia) Soyuz TMA-01M | ISS (crew 25/26) | 16 March 2011 (Russia) Soyuz TMA-01M | ISS crew rotation. |
| 284 | (Russia) Dmitri Kondratyev (United States) Catherine G. Coleman (3) (Italy) Paolo Nespoli (2) | 15 December 2010 (Russia) Soyuz TMA-20 | ISS (crew 26/27) | 24 May 2011 (Russia) Soyuz TMA-20 | ISS crew rotation. |

== See also ==
- List of human spaceflight programs
- List of human spaceflights
- List of human spaceflights, 1961–1970
- List of human spaceflights, 1971–1980
- List of human spaceflights, 1981–1990
- List of human spaceflights, 1991–2000
- List of human spaceflights, 2011–2020
- List of human spaceflights, 2021–present
