= Expedition 21 =

21st expedition to the International Space Station

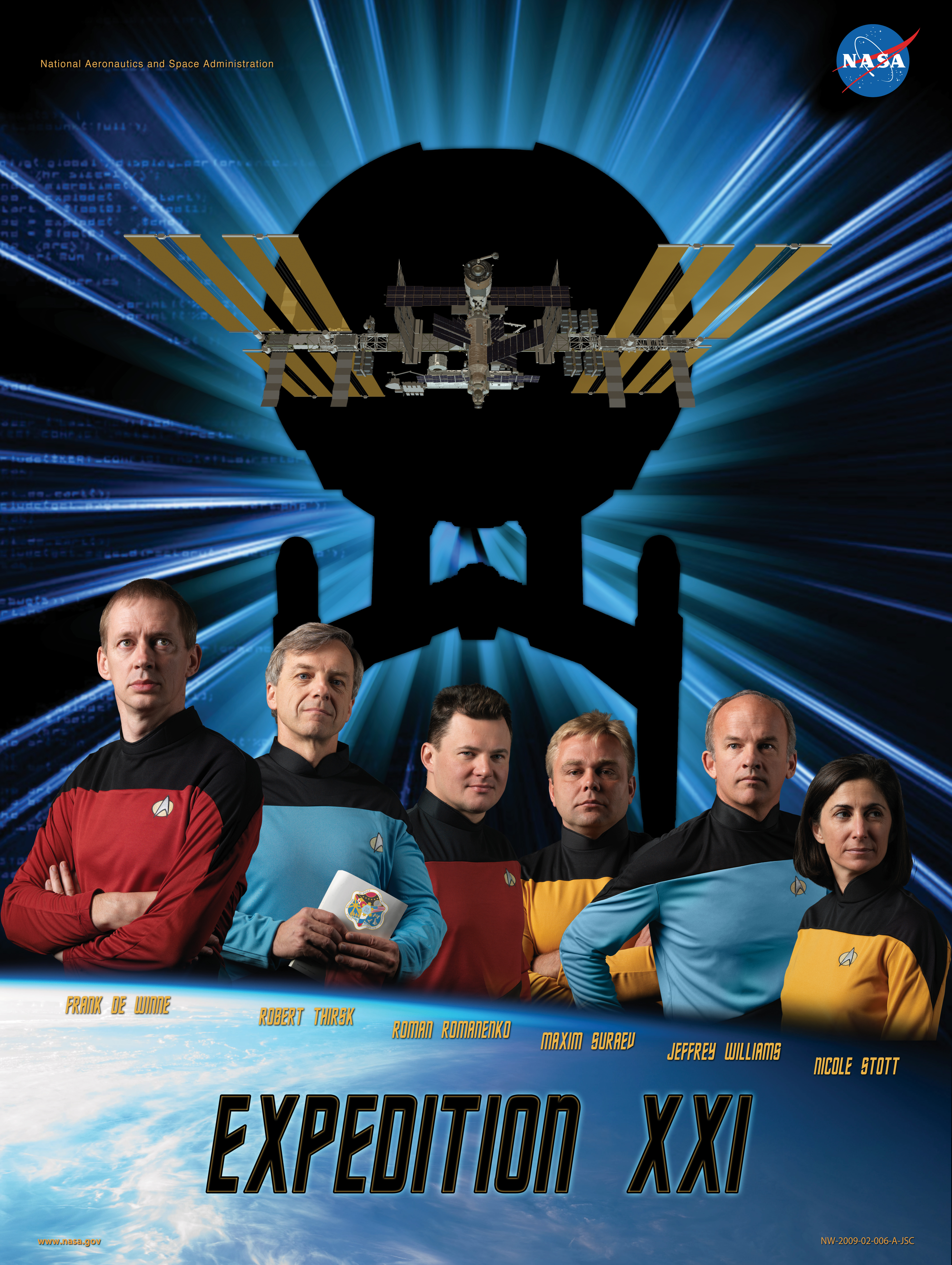
- Promotional Poster
- Mission type: Long-duration expedition

Expedition
- Space station: International Space Station
- Began: 11 October 2009
- Ended: 1 December 2009
- Arrived aboard: Soyuz TMA-15; Soyuz TMA-16; Stott: STS-128; Space Shuttle Discovery
- Departed aboard: Soyuz TMA-15; Soyuz TMA-16; Stott: STS-129; Space Shuttle Atlantis

Crew
- Crew size: 6 (to November); 5 (from November)
- Members: Expedition 20/21: Frank De Winne; Roman Romanenko; Robert Brent Thirsk; Nicole P. Stott (to November) Expedition 21/22: Jeffrey N. Williams; Maksim Surayev
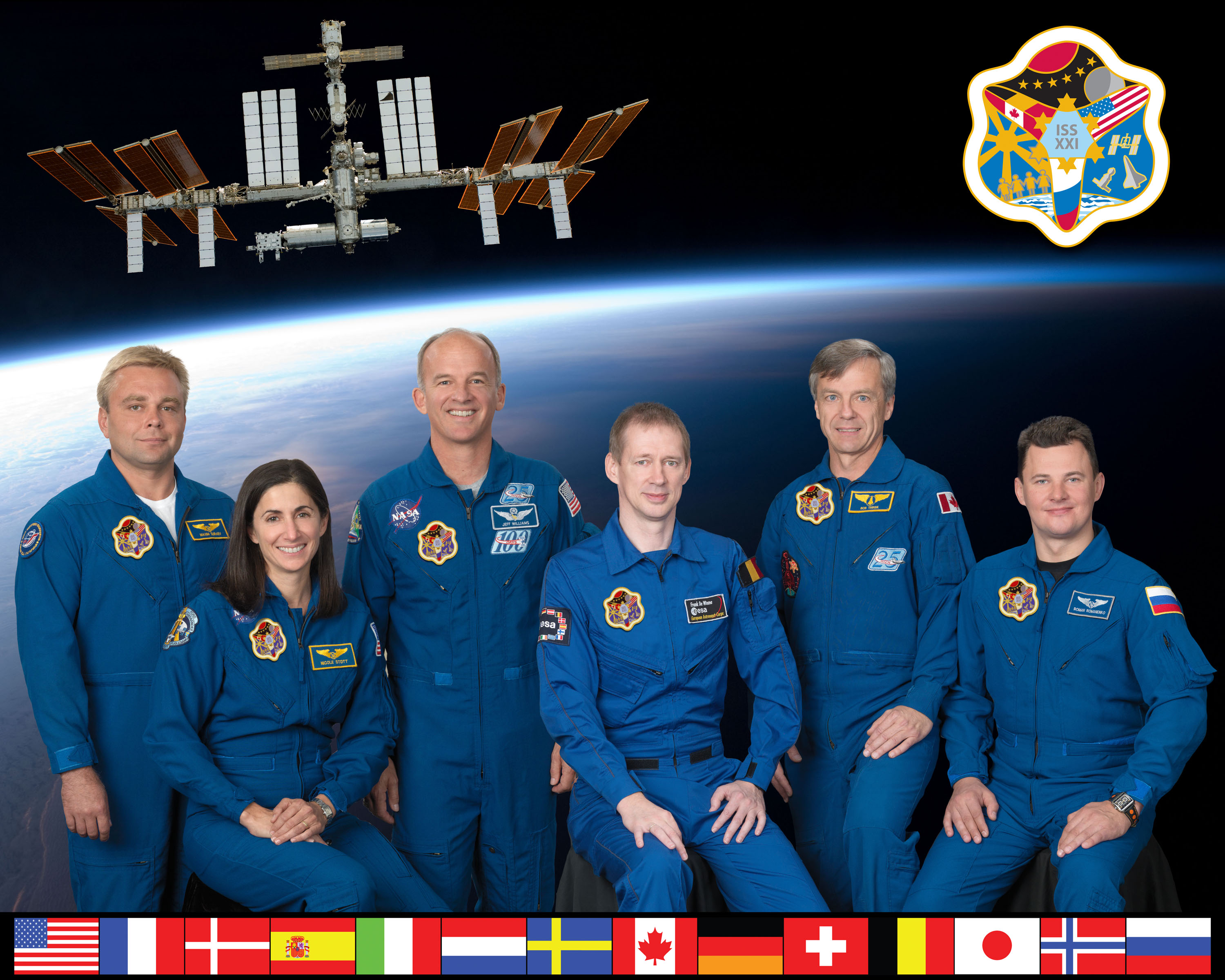
- Expedition 21 mission patch from left to right: Maksim Surayev, Nicole Stott, Jeffrey Williams, Frank De Winne (commander), Robert Thirsk, Roman Romanenko ISS expeditions

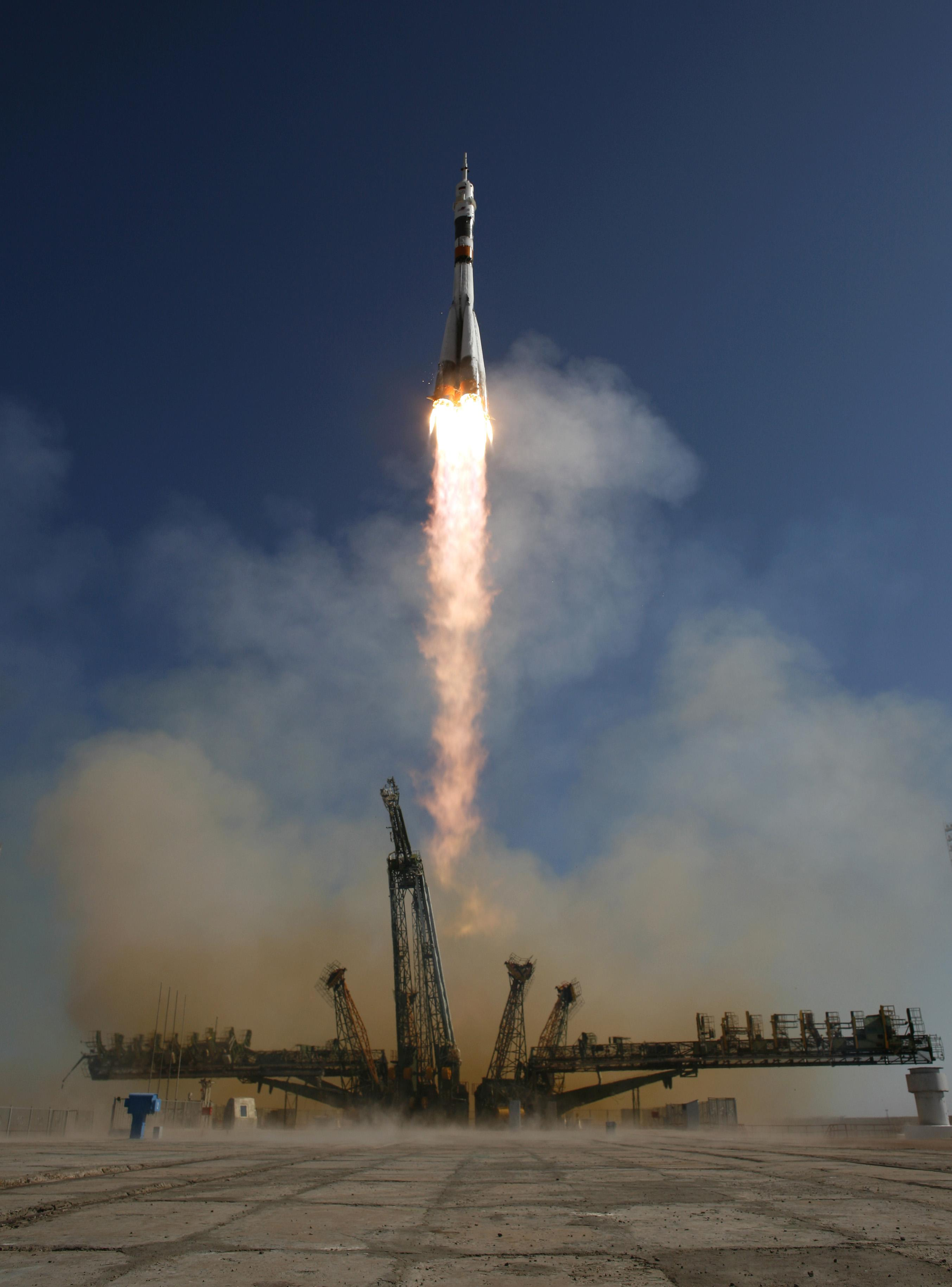
Expedition 21 lifts off.

Expedition 21 was the 21st long-duration mission to the International Space Station (ISS). The expedition began on 11 October 2009, with Frank de Winne becoming the first ESA astronaut to command a space mission.

The handover between Expedition 20 and Expedition 21 required three Soyuz vehicles being docked to the station at the same time, the first time this has occurred.

Soyuz TMA-16 brought the final members of Expedition 21 to the ISS, along with space tourist Guy Laliberté. Laliberté returned to Earth on Soyuz TMA-14 with two members of Expedition 20 on 11 October 2009.

Nicole P. Stott was the last ISS expedition crew member to fly on the Space Shuttle. She returned to Earth aboard STS-129 in November 2009.

== Crew ==
Position	First Part (October to November 2009)	Second Part (November to December 2009)
Commander	Frank De Winne, ESA; Second and last spaceflight	
Flight engineer	Roman Romanenko, RSA; First spaceflight	
Flight engineer	Robert Thirsk, CSA; Second and last spaceflight	
Flight engineer	Jeffrey N. Williams, NASA; Third spaceflight	
Flight engineer	Maksim Surayev, RSA; First spaceflight	
Flight engineer	Nicole P. Stott, NASA; First spaceflight	

Source
NASA

== Backup crew ==
- André Kuipers - Commander
- Dimitri Kondratyev
- Chris Hadfield
- Shannon Walker
- Aleksandr Skvortsov
- Catherine Coleman
