= Expedition 19 =

19th expedition to the International Space Station

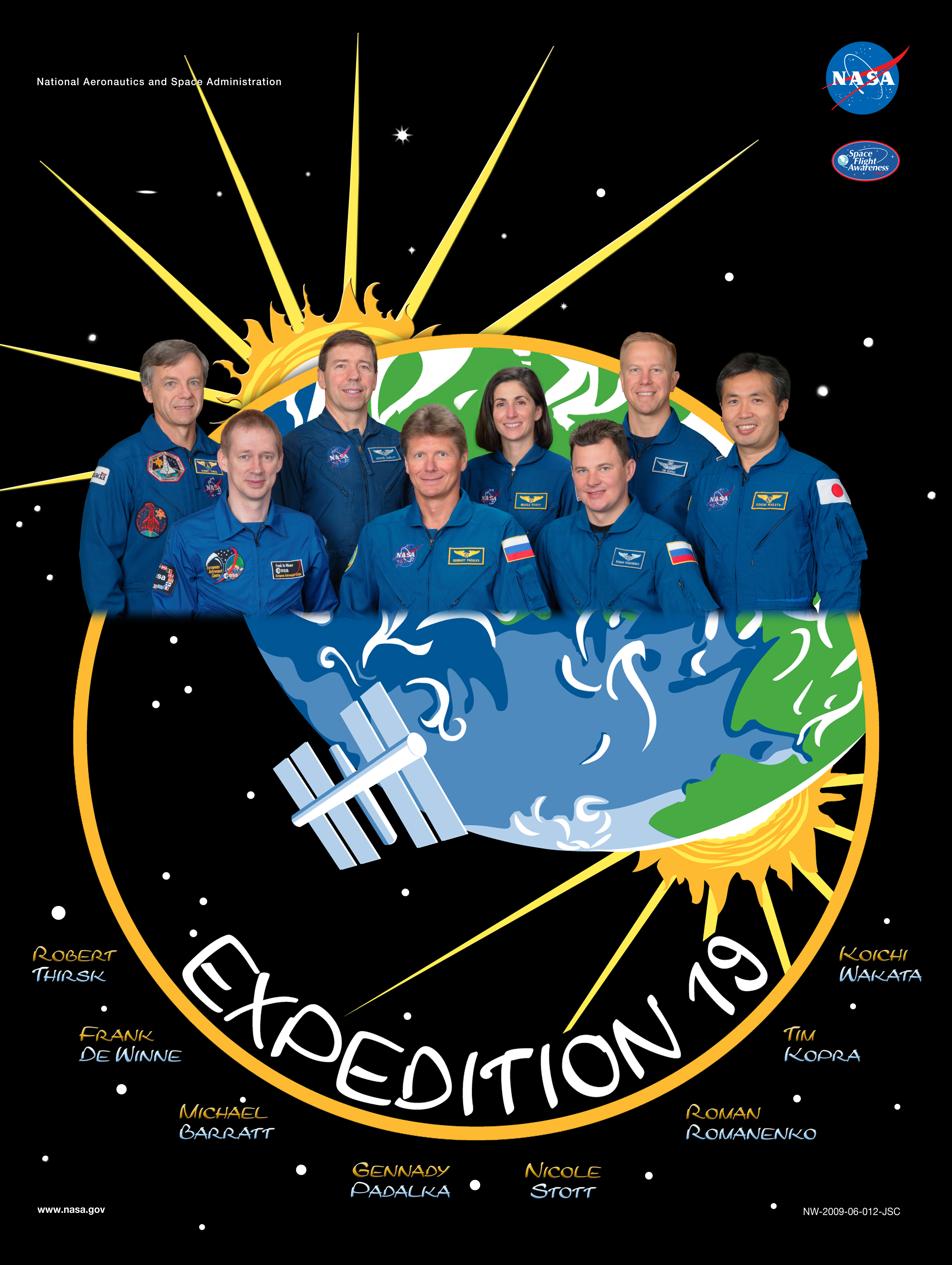
- Promotional Poster
- Mission type: Long-duration expedition
- Mission duration: 61 days, 23 hours, 29 minutes

Expedition
- Space station: International Space Station
- Began: 28 March 2009, 13:05 UTC
- Ended: 29 May 2009, 12:34 UTC
- Arrived aboard: Soyuz TMA-14; Wakata: STS-119; Space Shuttle Discovery
- Departed aboard: Soyuz TMA-14; Wakata: STS-127; Space Shuttle Endeavour

Crew
- Crew size: 3
- Members: Gennady Padalka; Michael Barratt; Koichi Wakata* * – transferred from Expedition 18; All members transferred to Expedition 20
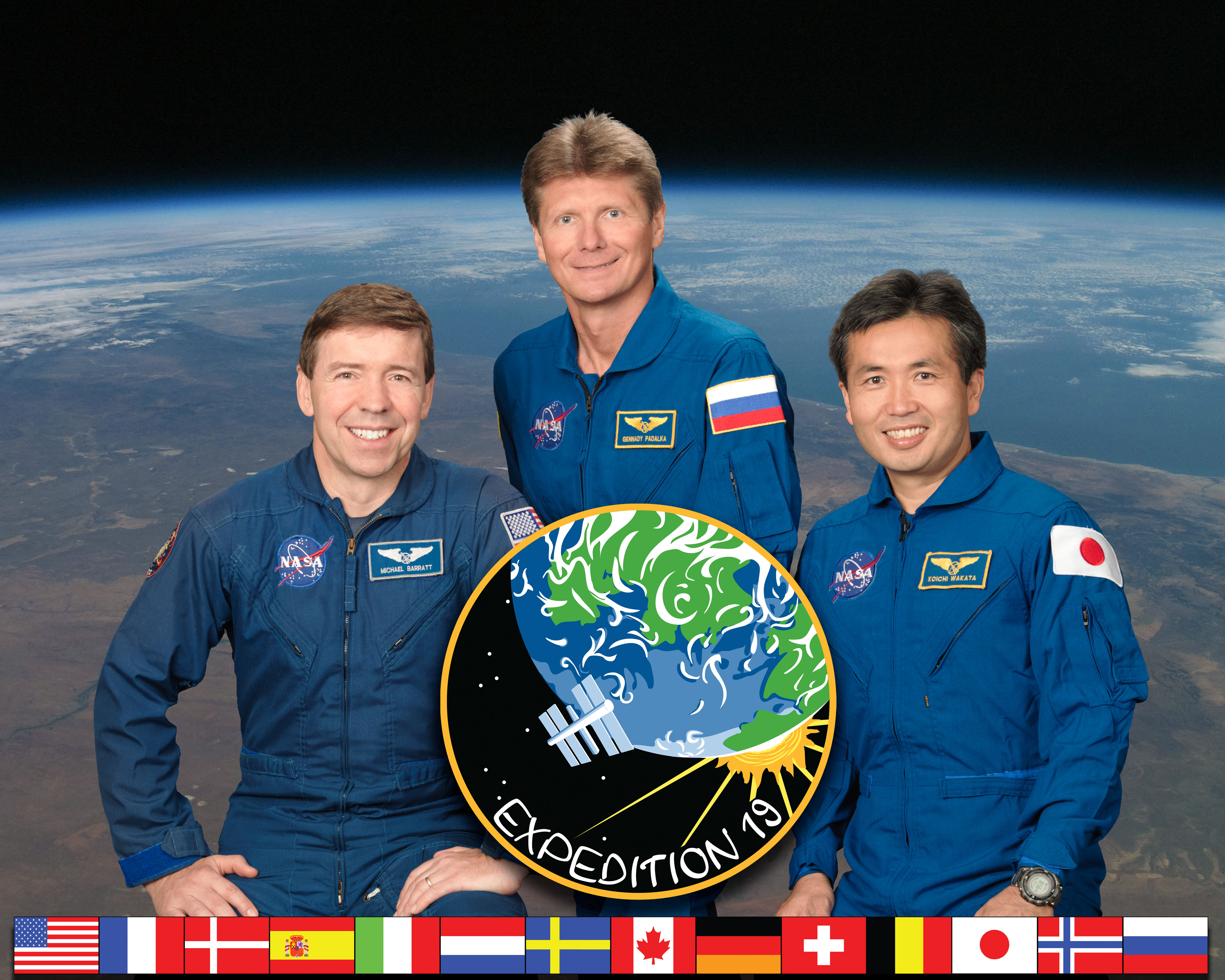
- Expedition 19 mission patch (Left to right) Michael Barratt, Gennady Padalka, Koichi Wakata ISS expeditions

Expedition 19 was the 19th long-duration flight to the International Space Station. This expedition launched on 26 March 2009, at 11:49 UTC aboard the Soyuz TMA-14 spacecraft. Expedition 19 was the final three crew member expedition, before the crew size increased to six crew members with Expedition 20.

The expedition was commanded by Russian Air Force Colonel Gennady Padalka. On 31 March 2009, Padalka raised an issue concerning shared use of facilities such as exercise equipment and toilet facilities. Padalka claims that initial approval to use exercise equipment owned by the U.S. government was subsequently turned down. Russian and American members of the crew have now been informed to use only their own toilets and not to share rations. The result was a general lowering of morale on the station.

== Crew ==
| Position | Crew Member |
|---|---|
| Commander | Gennady Padalka, RSA; Third spaceflight |
| Flight Engineer 1 | Michael Barratt, NASA; First spaceflight |
| Flight Engineer 2 | Koichi Wakata, JAXA; Third Spaceflight |

== Backup crew ==
- Maksim Surayev – Commander – RSA (For Padalka)
- Jeffrey Williams – Flight Engineer – NASA (For Barratt)
- Soichi Noguchi – Flight Engineer – JAXA (For Wakata)
