= Nicole Stott =

American astronaut and engineer (born 1962)

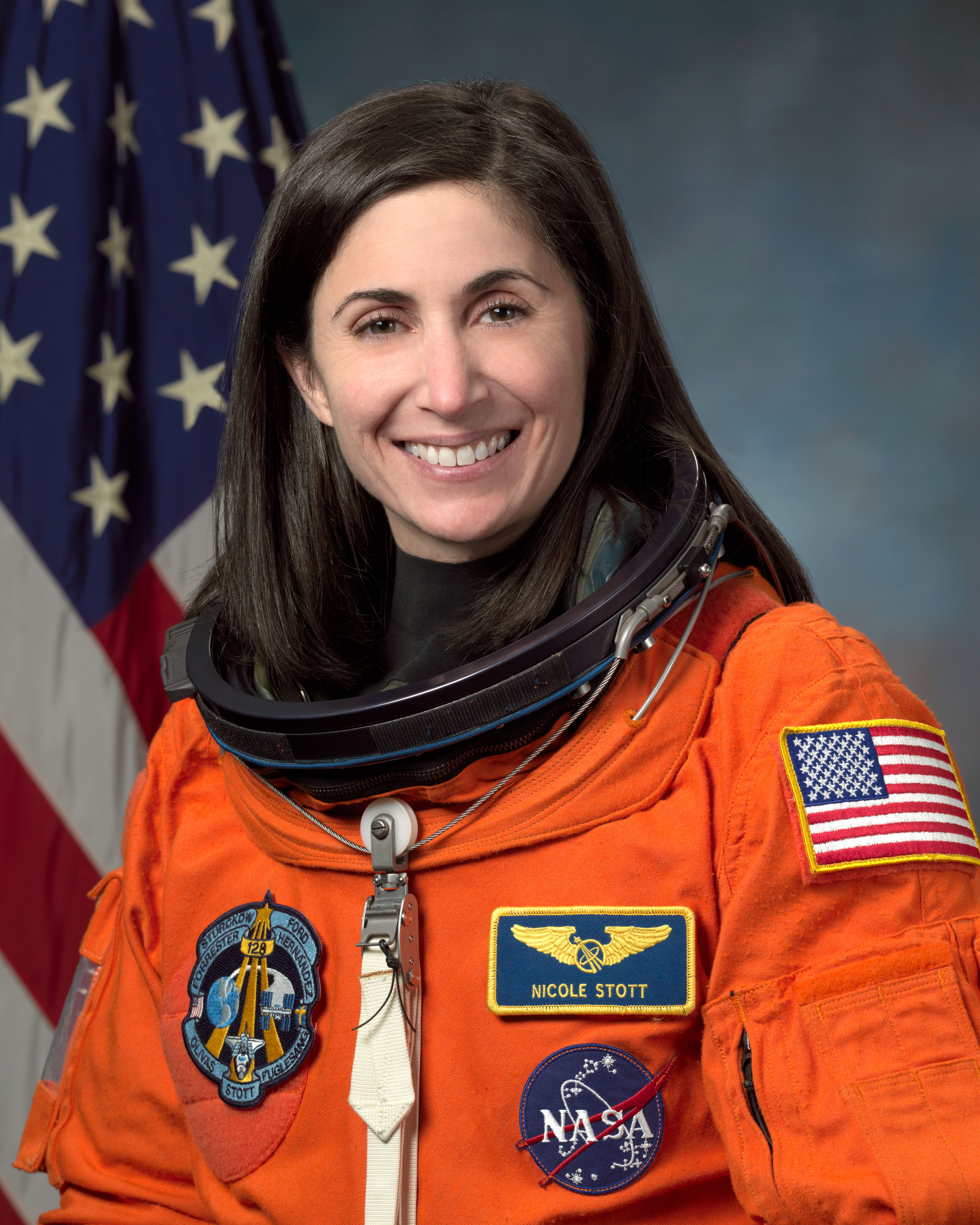
- Stott's official astronaut photograph in 2009
- Born: November 19, 1962 (age 63); Albany, New York, U.S.
- Education: St. Petersburg College; Embry-Riddle Aeronautical University (BS); University of Central Florida (MS)
- Spouse: Christopher Stott
- Space career

NASA astronaut
- Time in space: 103d 5h 49m
- Selection: NASA Group 18 (2000)
- Total EVAs: 1 (during STS-128)
- Total EVA time: 6h, 35m
- Mission: STS-128/STS-129 (Expedition 20/21), STS-133
- Mission insignia

Nicole Marie Passonno Stott (born November 19, 1962) is an American engineer and a retired NASA astronaut. She served as a flight engineer on ISS Expedition 20 and Expedition 21 and was a mission specialist on STS-128 and STS-133. After 27 years of working at NASA, the space agency announced her retirement effective June 1, 2015. She is married to Christopher Stott, a Manx-born American space entrepreneur.

== Early life and education ==
Stott was born in Albany, New York, and resides in St. Petersburg, Florida. She attended St. Petersburg College studying aviation administration, graduated with a B.S. degree in aeronautical engineering from Embry-Riddle Aeronautical University in 1987, and received her M.S. degree in Engineering Management from the University of Central Florida in 1992. Nicole Stott began her career in 1987 as a structural design engineer with Pratt & Whitney Government Engines in West Palm Beach, Florida. She spent a year with the Advanced Engines Group performing structural analyses of advanced jet engine component designs. Stott is an instrument rated private pilot.

== NASA career ==
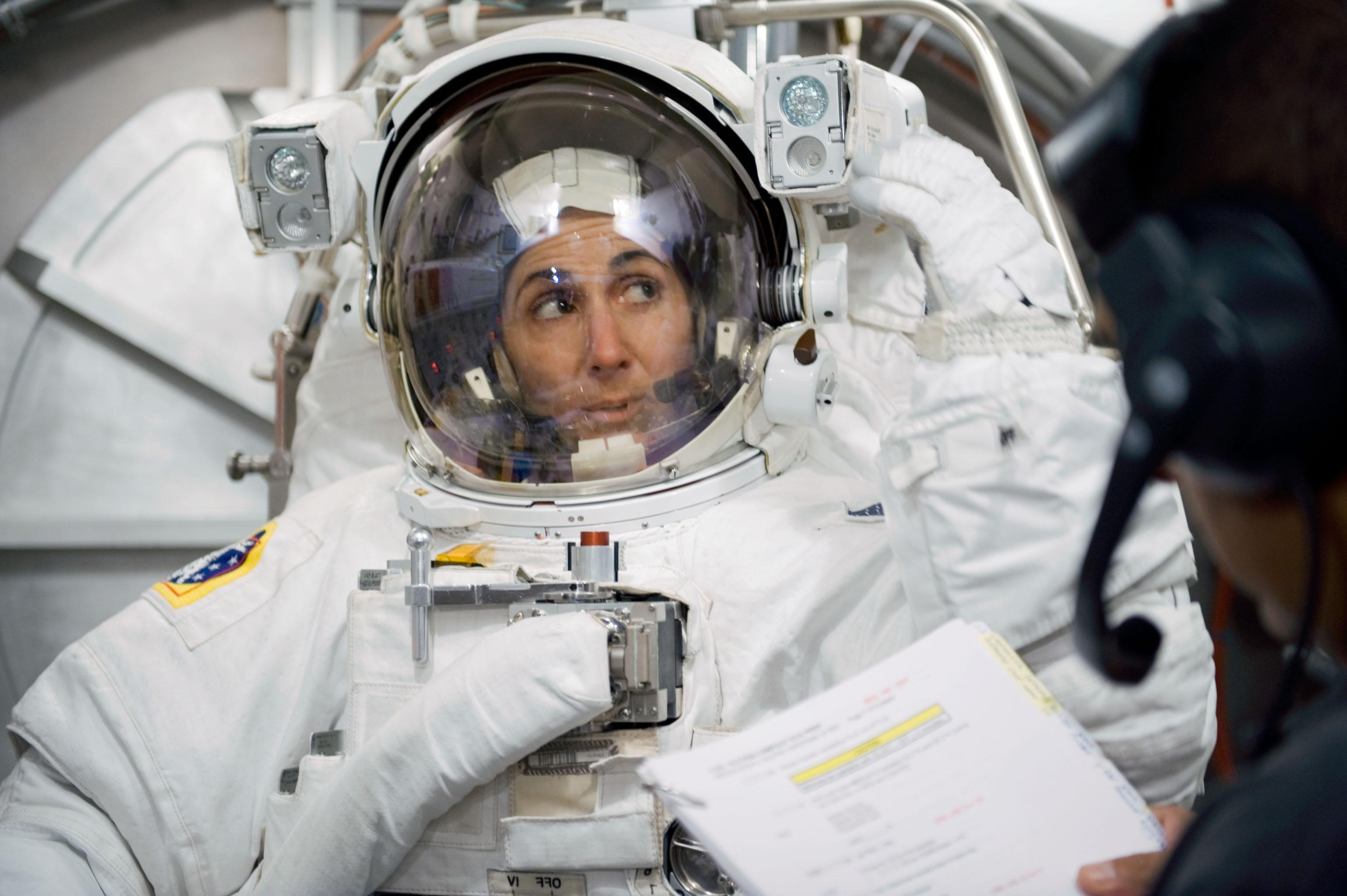
Nicole Stott participates in an Extravehicular Mobility Unit (EMU) spacesuit fit check.

In 1988, Stott joined NASA at the Kennedy Space Center (KSC), Florida as an Operations Engineer in the Orbiter Processing Facility (OPF). After six months, she was detailed to the Director of Shuttle Processing as part of a two-person team tasked with assessing the overall efficiency of Shuttle processing flows, and implementing tools for measuring the effectiveness of improvements. She was the NASA KSC Lead for a joint Ames/KSC software project to develop intelligent scheduling tools. The Ground Processing Scheduling System (GPSS) was developed as the technology demonstrator for this project. GPSS was a success at KSC, and also a commercial success that is part of the PeopleSoft suite of software products. During her time at KSC, Stott also held a variety of positions within NASA Shuttle Processing, including Vehicle Operations Engineer; NASA Convoy Commander; assistant to the Flow Director for Space Shuttle Endeavour; and Orbiter Project Engineer for Columbia. During her last two years at KSC, she was a member of the Space Station Hardware Integration Office and relocated to Huntington Beach, California, where she served as the NASA Project Lead for the ISS truss elements under construction at the Boeing Space Station facility. In 1998, she joined the Johnson Space Center (JSC) team in Houston, Texas, as a member of the NASA Aircraft Operations Division, where she served as a Flight Simulation Engineer (FSE) on the Shuttle Training Aircraft (STA).

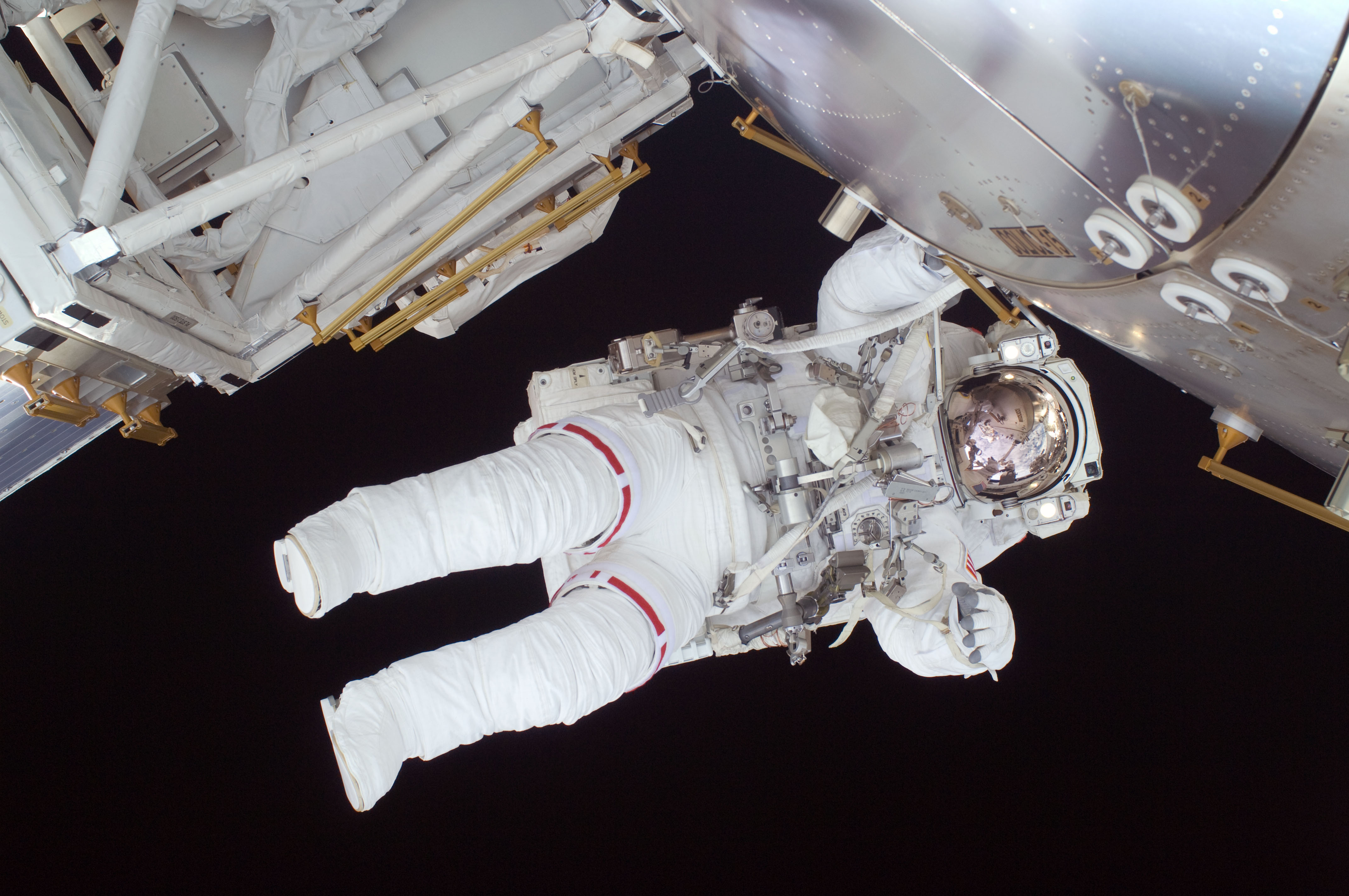
Stott participates in the first spacewalk of the STS-128 mission.

Selected as a mission specialist by NASA in July 2000, Stott reported for astronaut candidate training in August 2000. Following the completion of two years of training and evaluation, she was assigned technical duties in the Astronaut Office Station Operations Branch, where she performed crew evaluations of station payloads. She also worked as a support astronaut and CAPCOM for the ISS Expedition 10 crew. In April 2006, she was a crew member on the NEEMO 9 mission (NASA Extreme Environment Mission Operations) where she lived and worked with a six-person crew for 18 days on the Aquarius undersea research habitat. Stott was previously assigned to Expedition 20 and Expedition 21. She was launched to the International Space Station with the crew of STS-128, participating in the first spacewalk of that mission, and returned on STS-129, thus becoming the last Expedition crew-member to return to Earth via the space shuttle. Stott completed her second spaceflight on STS-133, the third to last flight of the space shuttle.

=== First live tweet-up from space ===
On October 21, 2009, Stott and her Expedition 21 crewmate Jeff Williams participated in the first NASA Tweetup from the station with members of the public gathered at NASA Headquarters in Washington, D.C. This involved the first live Twitter connection for the astronauts. Previously, astronauts on board the Space Shuttle or ISS had sent the messages they desired to send as tweets down to Mission Control which then posted them via the Internet to Twitter.

== Post NASA ==
Stott was featured in a Super Bowl LIV commercial promoting Girls Who Code. Stott has also written the book Back to Earth, described as "What Life in Space Taught Me About Our Home Planet and Our Mission to Protect It". She is also an artist and brought a small watercolor kit on ISS Expedition 21 where she was the first person to paint with watercolor in space. Her current works often relate to astronomy including her Earth Observation collection and Spacecraft collection. In 2022, she provided the narration to a piece being performed by the Schenectady Symphony Orchestra, Glen Cortese's "Voyager: A Journey to the Stars". Stott is a founding director of the Space for Art Foundation, which seeks to combine art and space exploration for healing.
