= Soyuz TMA-16 =

2009 Russian crewed spaceflight to the ISS

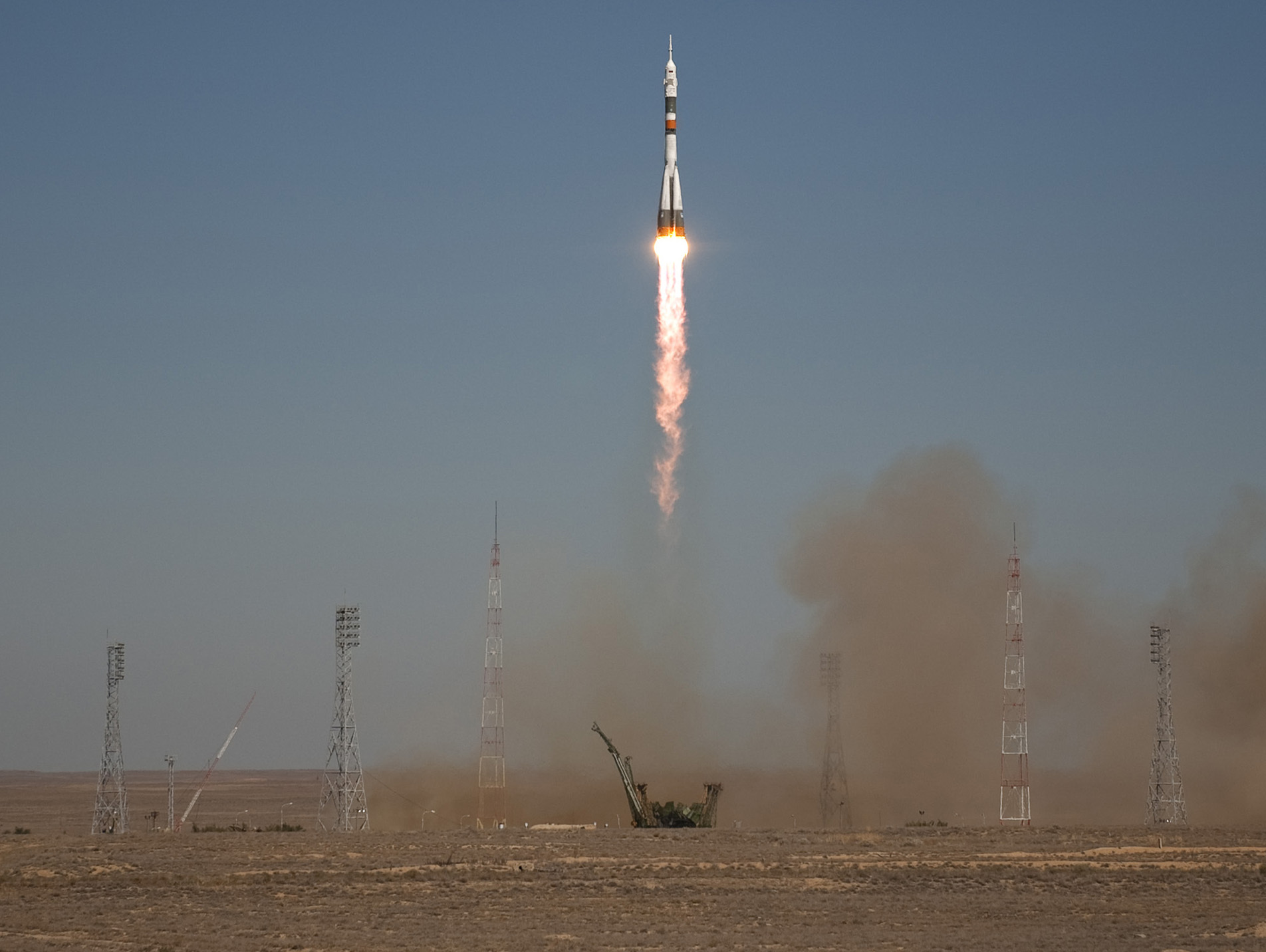
- Mission type: ISS crew rotation
- Operator: Roscosmos
- COSPAR ID: 2009-053A
- SATCAT no.: 35940
- Mission duration: 168 days

Spacecraft properties
- Spacecraft: Soyuz No.226
- Spacecraft type: Soyuz-TMA 11F732
- Manufacturer: Energia

Crew
- Crew size: 3 up 2 down
- Members: Maksim Surayev; Jeffrey Williams
- Launching: Guy Laliberté

Start of mission
- Launch date: September 30, 2009, 07:14:45 UTC
- Rocket: Soyuz-FG
- Launch site: Baikonur 1/5

End of mission
- Landing date: March 18, 2010, 11:24 UTC

Orbital parameters
- Reference system: Geocentric
- Regime: Low Earth
- Perigee altitude: 340 kilometres (210 mi)
- Apogee altitude: 351 kilometres (218 mi)
- Inclination: 51.6 degrees
- Period: 91.44 minutes
- Epoch: October 7, 2009

Docking with ISS
- Docking port: Zvezda aft
- Docking date: 2 October 2009; 08:35 UTC
- Undocking date: 21 January 2010; 10:03 UTC
- Time docked: 111d 1h 28m

Docking with ISS (Relocation)
- Docking port: Poisk zenith
- Docking date: 21 January 2010; 10:24 UTC
- Undocking date: 18 March 2010; 08:03 UTC
- Time docked: 55d 21h 39m
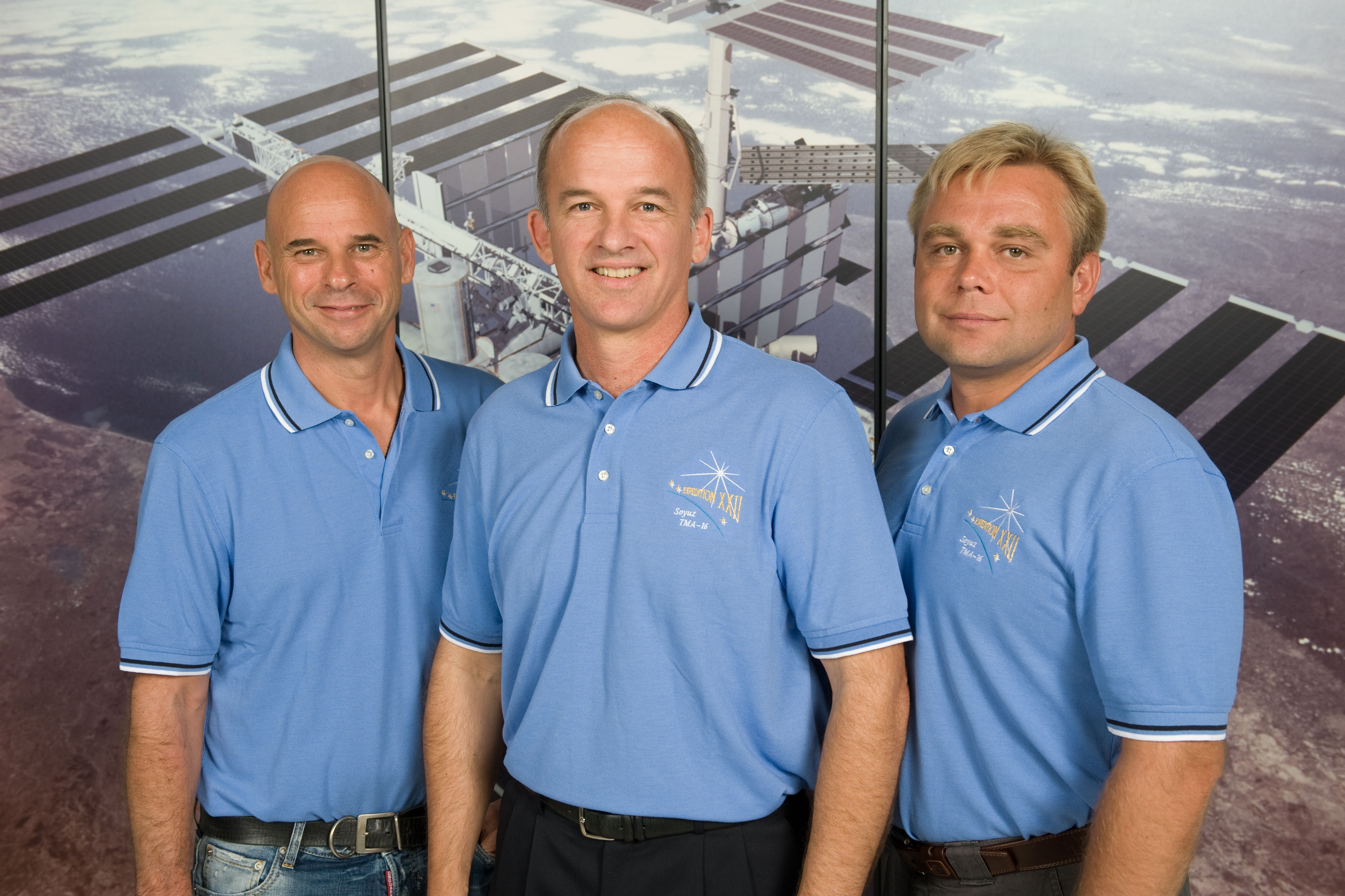
- From left to right: Laliberté, Williams and Surayev Soyuz programme (Crewed missions)

The Soyuz TMA-16 (Russian: Союз TMA-16) was a crewed flight to and from the International Space Station (ISS). It transported two members of the Expedition 21 crew and a Canadian entrepreneur from the Baikonur Cosmodrome in Kazakhstan to the ISS. TMA-16 was the 103rd flight of a Soyuz spacecraft, the first flight launching in 1967. The launch of Soyuz TMA-16 marked the first time since 1969 that three Soyuz craft were in orbit simultaneously.

Guy Laliberté, founder and CEO of Cirque du Soleil, was a Space tourist aboard TMA-16 during its flight to the ISS, paying approximately US$35 million for his seat through the American firm Space Adventures. He returned on board the Soyuz TMA-14 spacecraft left as an emergency vehicle during that previous flight. The Soyuz TMA-16 flight spacecraft flew back to Earth with only two crew members.

== Crew ==
Position	Launching Crew Member	Landing Crew Member
Commander	(Russia) Maksim Surayev; Expedition 21; First spaceflight	
Flight Engineer	(United States) Jeffrey Williams, NASA; Expedition 21; Third spaceflight	
Spaceflight Participant	(Canada) Guy Laliberté, SA; Only spaceflight Tourist	None

== Backup Crew ==
Position	Launching Crew Member	Landing Crew Member
Commander	(Russia) Aleksandr Skvortsov	
Flight Engineer	(United States) Shannon Walker, NASA	
Spaceflight Participant	(United States) Barbara Barrett, SA; Tourist	None

== Mission highlights ==
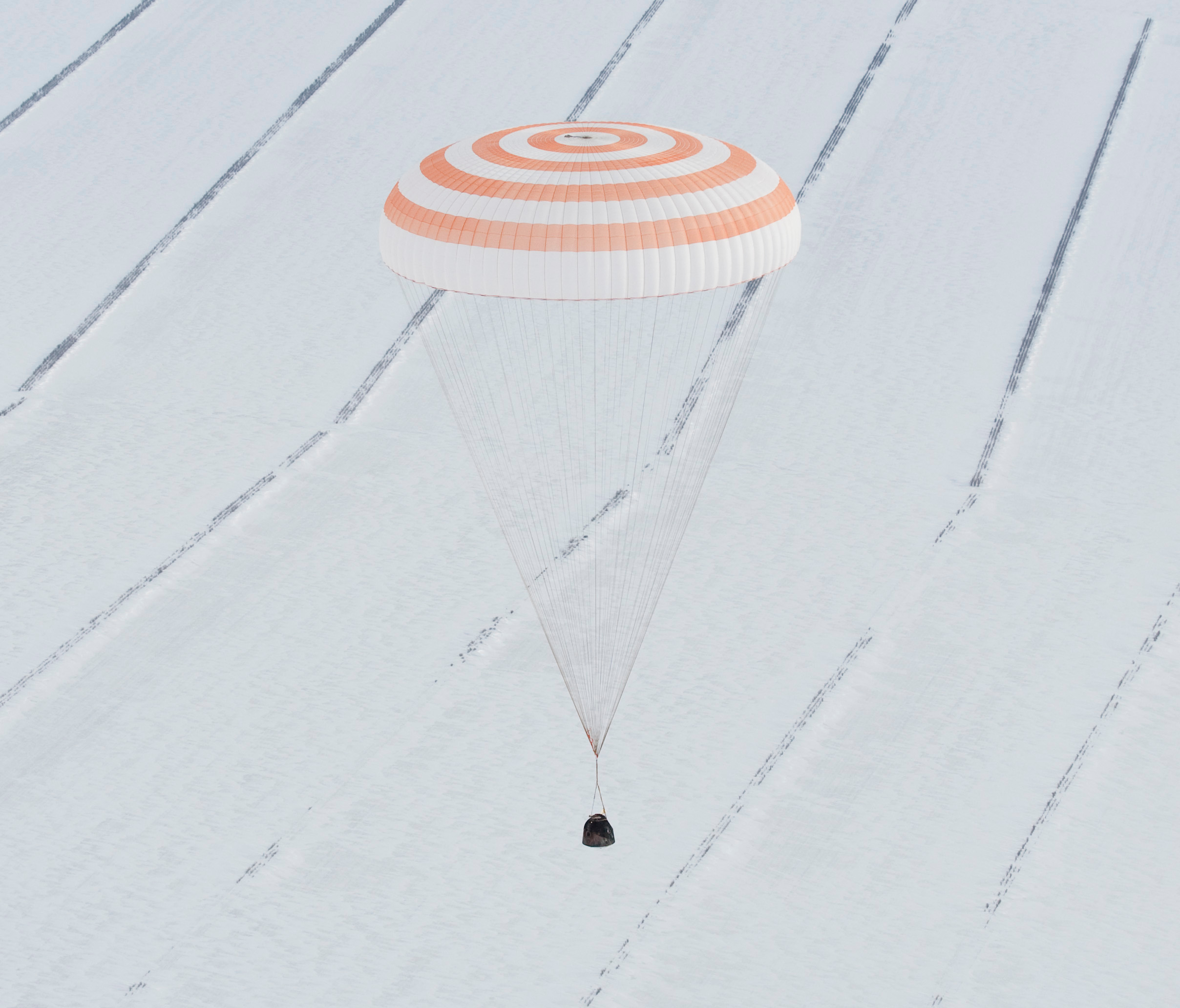
Soyuz TMA-16 lands

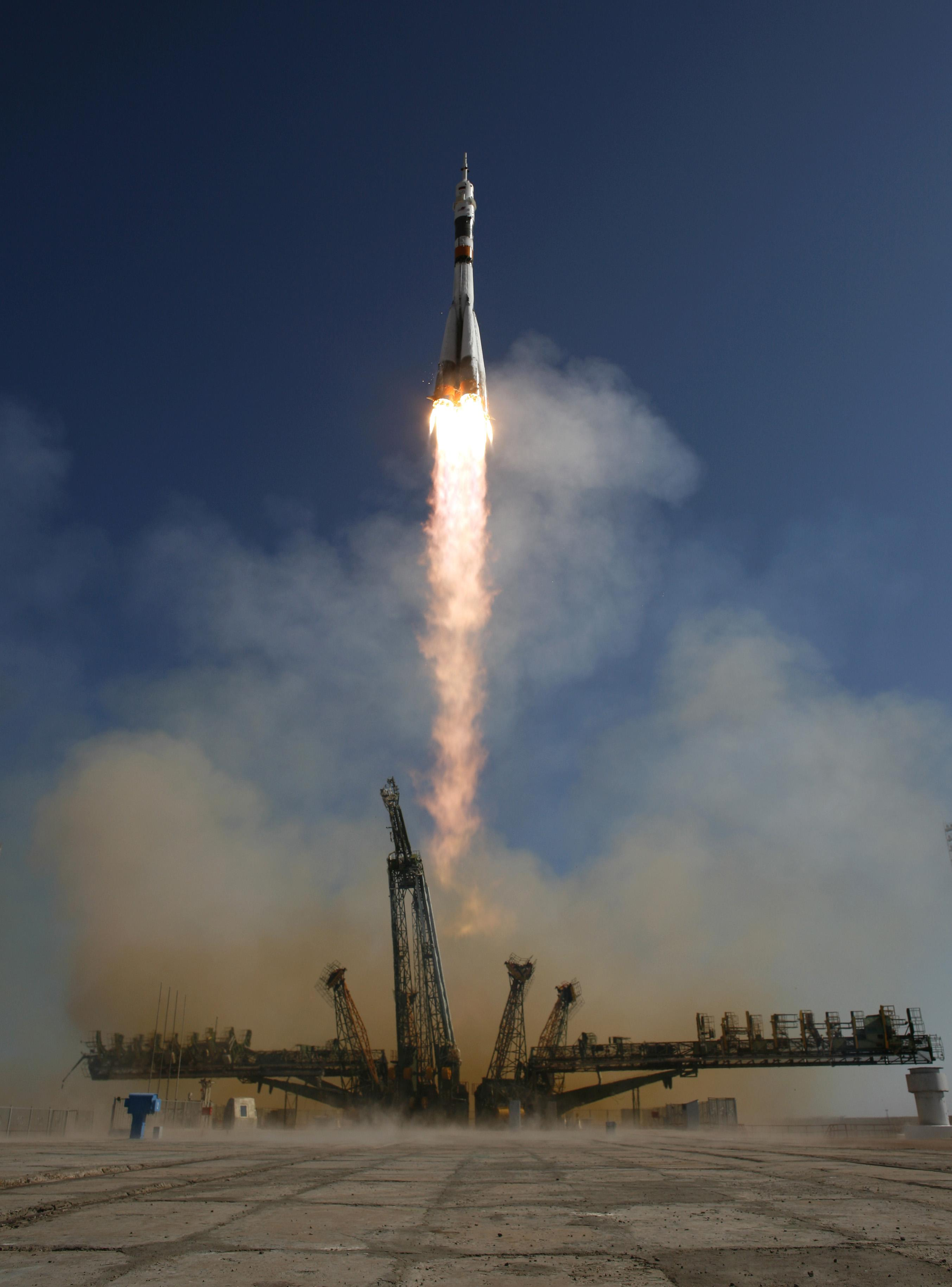
Soyuz TMA-16 lifts off

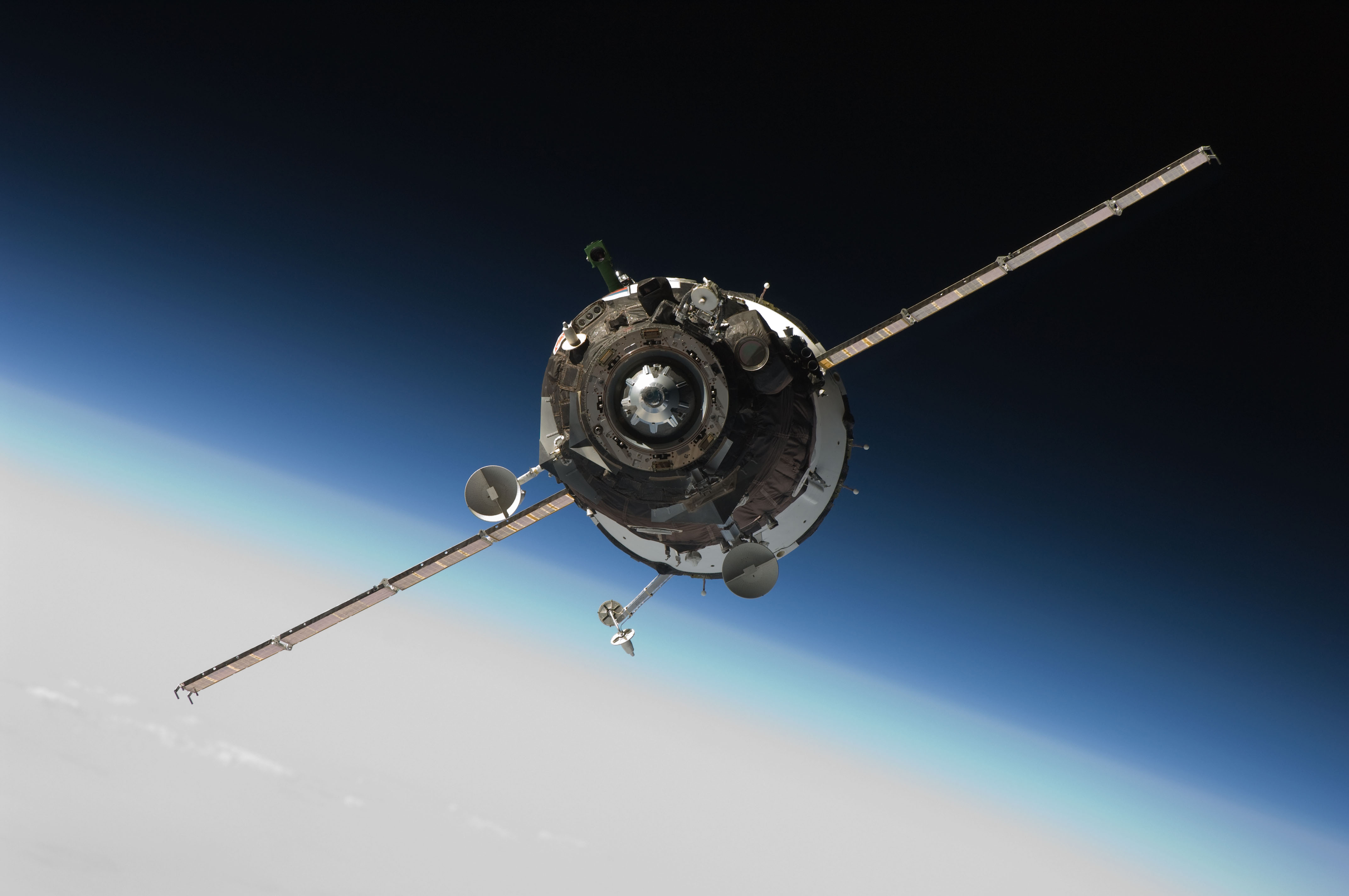
The Soyuz TMA-16 spacecraft approaches the International Space Station

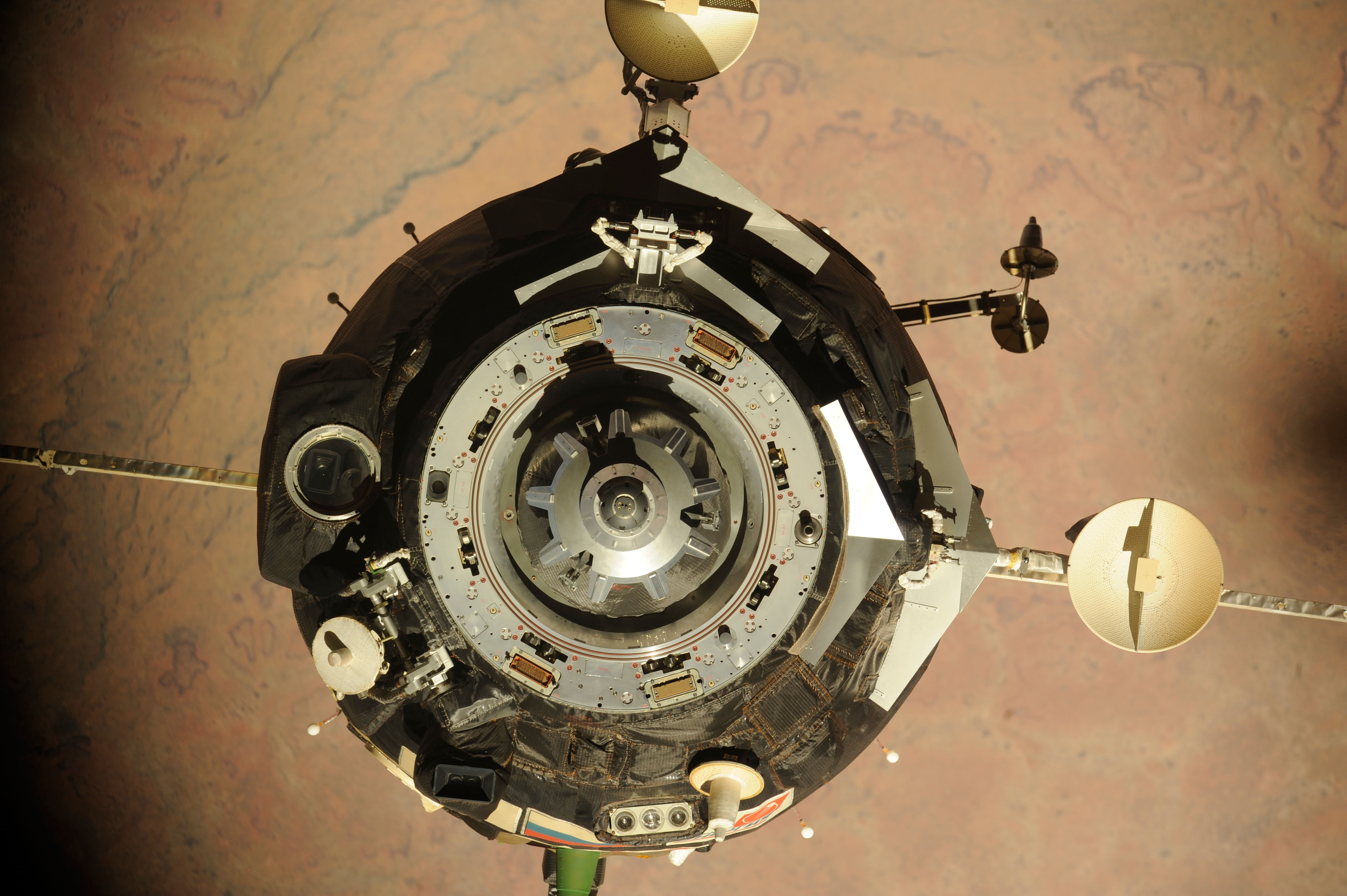
Soyuz TMA-16 during the relocation to the zenith-facing port of the Poisk module.

Soyuz TMA-16 was docked to the ISS at the aft port of the Zvezda module. On January 21, 2010, cosmonaut Suraev and Expedition 22 Commander Jeffrey Williams relocated the spacecraft to the zenith-facing port of the Poisk module. The Soyuz TMA-16 spacecraft undocked from the aft end of the Zvezda service module at 5:03 a.m. EST and backed away to a distance of about 100 feet from the space station. Undocking occurred as the station flew about 213 miles high off the southwest coast of Africa. Re-docking occurred at 5:24 a.m. EST after Suraev fired the Soyuz maneuvering thrusters to fly halfway around the orbiting space station and line up with the Poisk module.

Spaceflight participant Guy Laliberté landed aboard Soyuz TMA-14 after approximately 12 days in space while Surayev and Williams landed aboard TMA-16 in Kazakhstan on March 18, 2010.

== Space tourism status ==
Soyuz TMA-16 was the final flight of a space tourist to the International Space Station for more than a decade. With the imminent retirement of the Space Shuttle and the expansion of the station to six crew members, all Soyuz crew positions for the foreseeable future were to be occupied by Expedition crew until another crewed spacecraft such as Dragon 2 or Starliner was available to service the International Space Station.
