= Soyuz TMA-14 =

2009 Russian crewed spaceflight to the ISS

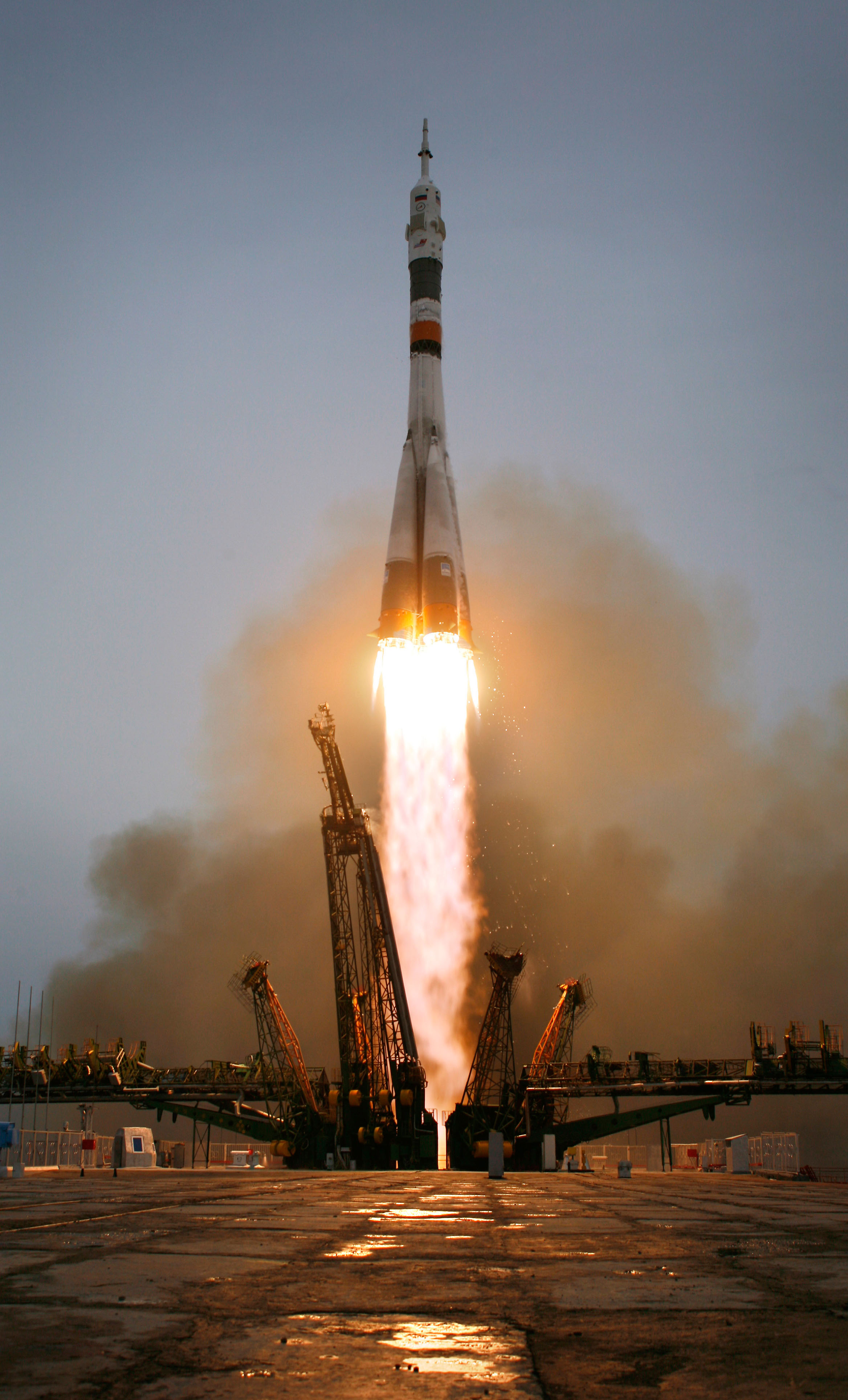
- Operator: Roscosmos
- COSPAR ID: 2009-015A
- SATCAT no.: 34669
- Mission duration: 198 days, 16 hours, 42 minutes

Spacecraft properties
- Spacecraft: Soyuz-TMA No.224
- Spacecraft type: Soyuz-TMA 11F732
- Manufacturer: Energia

Crew
- Crew size: 3
- Members: Gennady Padalka; Michael Barratt
- Launching: Charles Simonyi
- Landing: Guy Laliberté
- Callsign: Альтаир (Altair)

Start of mission
- Launch date: March 26, 2009, 11:49:18 UTC
- Rocket: Soyuz-FG
- Launch site: Baikonur, Site 1/5

End of mission
- Landing date: October 11, 2009, 04:32 UTC

Orbital parameters
- Reference system: Geocentric orbit
- Regime: Low Earth orbit
- Perigee altitude: 224 km (139 mi)
- Apogee altitude: 272 km (169 mi)
- Inclination: 51.6°
- Period: 89.46 minutes
- Epoch: March 27, 2009

Docking with ISS
- Docking port: Zvezda aft
- Docking date: 28 March 2009, 13:05 UTC
- Undocking date: 2 July 2009, 21:29 UTC
- Time docked: 96 days, 8 hours, 24 minutes

Docking with ISS (relocation)
- Docking port: Pirs nadir
- Docking date: 2 July 2009, 21:54 UTC
- Undocking date: 11 October 2009, 01:07 UTC
- Time docked: 100 days, 3 hours, 13 minutes
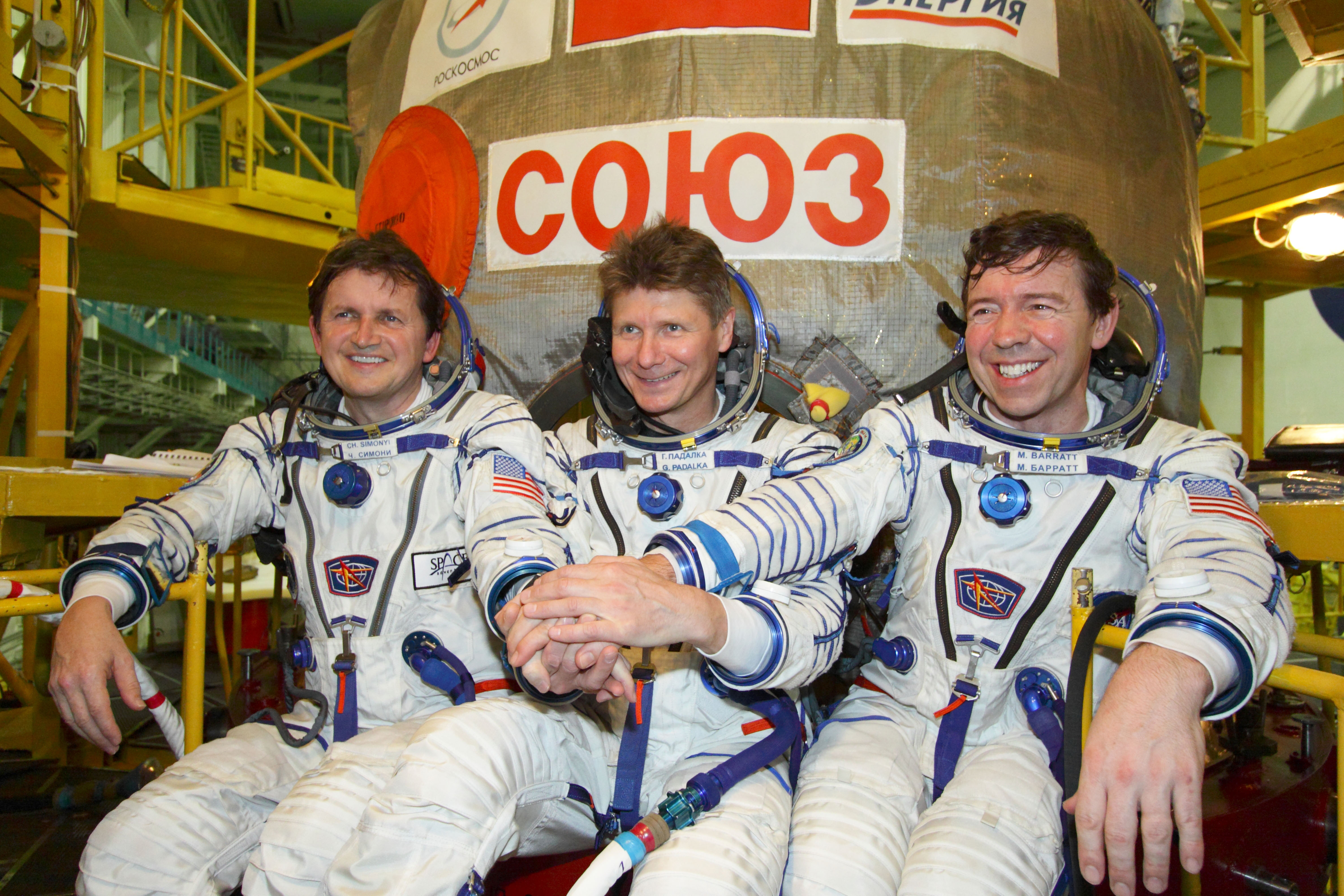
- Launching crew from left: Simonyi, Padalka and Barratt Soyuz programme

The Soyuz TMA-14 (Russian: Союз ТМА-14, Union TMA-14) was a Soyuz flight to the International Space Station, which launched on 26 March 2009. It transported two members of the Expedition 19 crew as well as spaceflight participant Charles Simonyi on his second self-funded flight to the space station. TMA-14 was the 101st crewed flight of a Soyuz spacecraft, including launch failures; however, it was the 100th to launch and land crewed, as Soyuz 34 was launched uncrewed to replace Soyuz 32, which landed empty.

== Crew ==
Position	Launching Crew Member	Landing Crew Member
Commander	(Russia) Gennady Padalka; Expedition 19; Third spaceflight	
Flight Engineer	(United States) Michael Barratt, NASA; Expedition 19; First spaceflight	
Spaceflight Participant	(Hungary) / (United States) Charles Simonyi, SA; Second and last spaceflight Tourist	(Canada) Guy Laliberté, SA; Only spaceflight Tourist

=== Backup crew ===
Position	Launching Cosmonaut	Landing Cosmonaut
Commander	(Russia) Maksim Surayev	
Flight Engineer	(United States) Shannon Walker, NASA	
Spaceflight Participant	(United States) Esther Dyson, SA; Tourist	(United States) Barbara Barrett, SA; Tourist

== Mission highlights ==
Soyuz TMA-14 was docked to the space station for the remainder of the Expedition 20 increment to serve as an emergency escape vehicle. The spacecraft swapped its docking ports at the International Space Station from Zvezda SM aft port to Pirs DC nadir port on 2 July 2009. This allowed Progress 34P to dock at the SM aft port on 29 July 2009.

Soyuz TMA-14 undocked and landed safely on 11 October 2009. On board for the return flight was the space tourist Guy Laliberté. Laliberté was launched with Expedition 21 on Soyuz TMA-16. He is the first Canadian space tourist.

== Logo contest ==
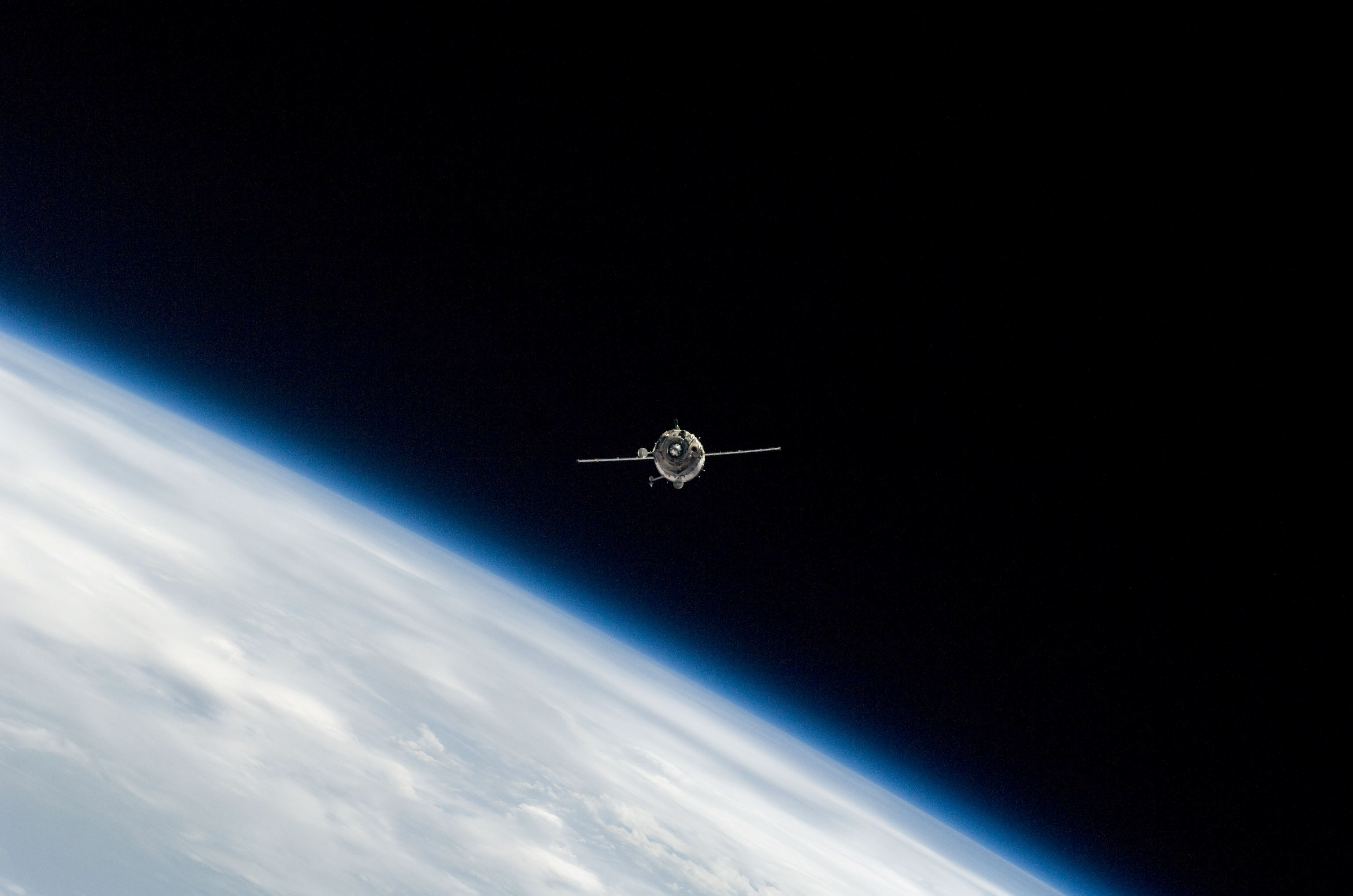
Soyuz TMA-14 approaches the International Space Station on 28 March 2009.

Roscosmos, in cooperation with other nations' space programs, invited children ages 6 to 15 to design and submit a patch for Soyuz TMA-14 from October 25, 2008 through December 25, 2008. On December 29, 2008, Roscosmos hosted a ceremony to announce the winners. Anna Chibiskova, 12, from Moscow was chosen for first place and her artwork was incorporated into the design of the official Soyuz TMA-14 crew patch. Kaitlin Riley, 12, from New York, U.S., and Stanislav Pyatkin, 11, from Uglegorsk, Russia, were selected as the second and third-place winners respectively by TMA-14 crew mates Gennady Padalka and Michael Barrett. A fourth winner, Roma Kuznetsov, 7, from Kazakhstan, was further selected by Roscosmos director Anatoly Perimov. All four were invited to the launch of Soyuz TMA-14 with expenses paid by the Russian Insurance Center.

== Spacecraft location ==
The descent capsule is on display at the Museum of Flight in Seattle, Washington.
