= Guy Laliberté =

Canadian businessman (born 1959)

Guy Laliberté OC CQ
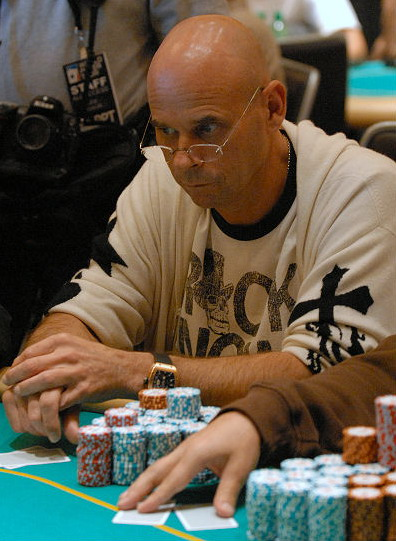
- Laliberté at the $25,000 World Poker Tour No-Limit Hold'em Championship
- Born: 2 September 1959 (age 67); Quebec City, Quebec, Canada
- Occupation: Businessman
- Known for: Co-founder of Cirque du Soleil
- Political party: Rhinoceros (1980)
- Spouse(s): Rizia Moreira (ex de facto spouse); Claudia Barilla (ex-girlfriend)
- Children: 5
- Nickname: Ahtata (Full Tilt Poker)

World Poker Tour
- Title: None
- Final table: 1
- Money finishes: 2
- Space career

Space Adventures tourist
- Time in space: 10d 21h 17m
- Missions: Soyuz TMA-16 / TMA-14

Guy Laliberté OC CQ (French pronunciation: [ɡi lalibɛʁte]; born 2 September 1959) is a Québécois billionaire businessman and poker player. Along with Gilles Ste-Croix, he is the co-founder of Cirque du Soleil, which was founded in 1984. The Canadian circus company's shows have since been seen by more than 90 million people worldwide. Before founding the company, he had busked, performing as an accordion player, stiltwalker, and fire-eater.

In 2006, he was named the Ernst & Young Canadian Entrepreneur of the Year. In 2007, he was named Ernst & Young World Entrepreneur of the Year. In January 2018, Laliberté was ranked by Forbes as the 11th-wealthiest Canadian.

== Early years ==
Laliberté was born in 1959 in Quebec City, Quebec, Canada. His interest in show business began when his parents took him to watch the Ringling Brothers and Barnum & Bailey Circus, an experience which led him to read the biography of P. T. Barnum. While he was still in school, he produced several performing arts events.

After school, Laliberté left Canada to hitchhike around Europe at the age of 18. While travelling, he made money by playing the accordion. He also learned fire-eating and stilt-walking during his time abroad, and after returning to Canada, became a street performer on the streets of Quebec. Laliberté joined a performing troupe called Les Échassiers, which included fire-breathers, jugglers, and acrobats who hitchhiked around the country to shows. He later returned to Quebec, where he obtained a full-time job at a hydroelectric dam. However, soon after his employment began, the company's employees went on strike. Laliberté took the opportunity to return to his life as a street performer.

He ran as a Rhinoceros Party candidate for the electoral district of Charlevoix in the 1980 federal election.

== Career ==
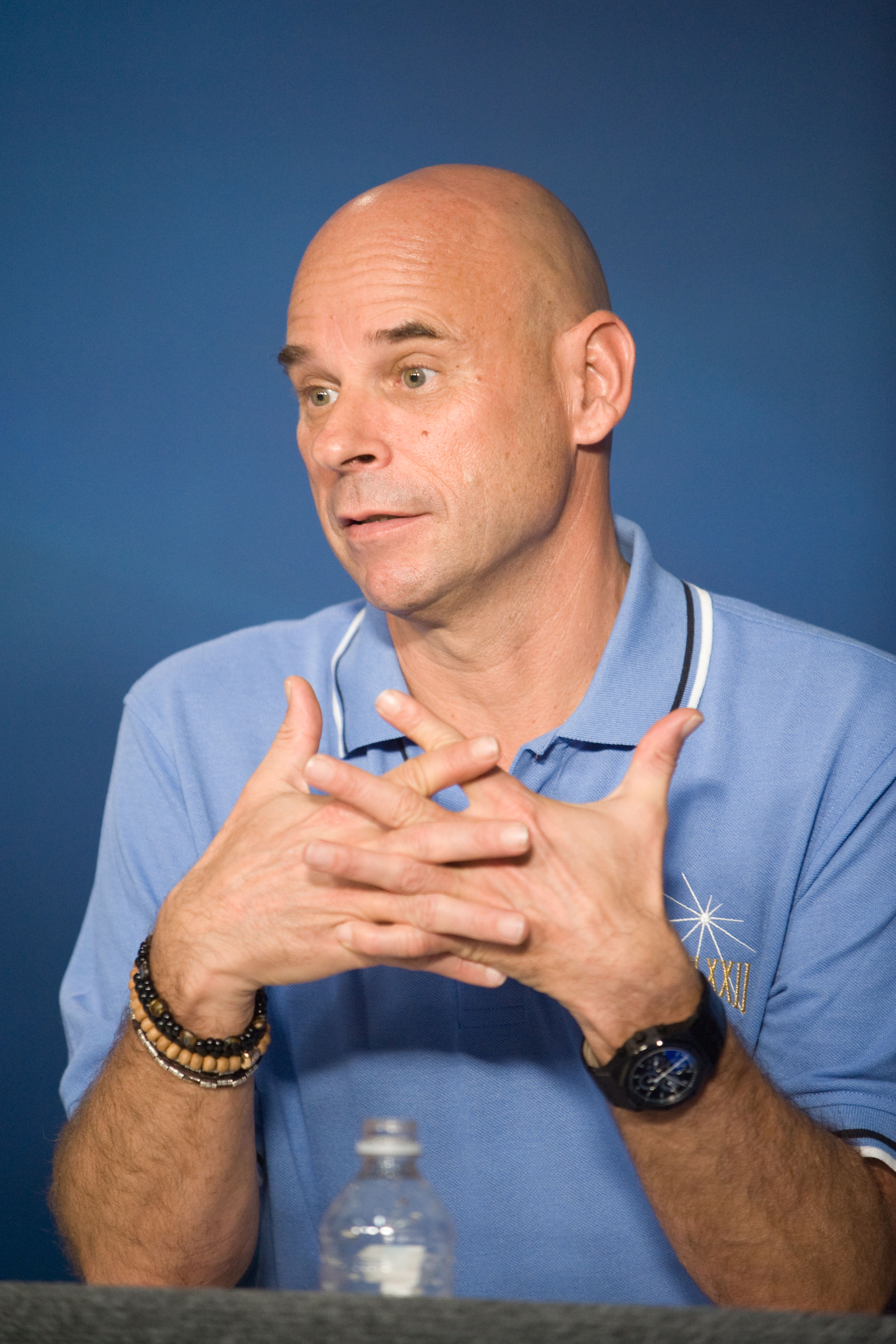
Laliberté during a press conference at the Johnson Space Center

=== Cirque du Soleil ===
Laliberté co-founded Cirque du Soleil in 1984 with Gilles Ste-Croix and a small group of colleagues. The group obtained the support of a government grant for the celebration of the 450th anniversary of Jacques Cartier's discovery of Canada. Cirque du Soleil was originally set up as a one-year project. However, the government of Quebec wanted a touring event that would perform in other provinces. The name 'Cirque du Soleil' ("circus of the sun"), which Laliberté came up with while he was in Hawaii, reflects his notion that "the sun stands for energy and youth" and that the circus is about those two words.

Cirque du Soleil now has activities on five continents. Its shows employ approximately 4,000 people from over 40 countries and generate an estimated annual revenue exceeding US$810 million.

In 2015, he sold 90% of his stock in the company. On 17 February 2020, he sold the remaining 10% to Caisse de dépôt et placement du Québec.

=== Poker career ===
Laliberté started playing super-high-stakes online cash games and live tournaments for recreation around 2006. In April 2007, he finished fourth in the World Poker Tour Season Five event at Bellagio in Las Vegas and won $696,220. He also played on GSN's High Stakes Poker Season 4 show and took part in Poker After Dark season 4 alongside Tom Dwan and Phil Hellmuth. He was also known for frequenting the highest stakes games on Full Tilt Poker.

In 2011, Laliberté announced the Big One, a US$1 million buy-in tournament which was featured at the 2012 World Series of Poker. Part of the prize money was donated to Laliberté's philanthropic organization One Drop Foundation, whose primary goal is to provide clean drinking water and hygiene products around the globe. Forty-eight players participated in the tournament and Antonio Esfandiari won the $18,346,673 first-place prize. The tournament raised $5,333,328 for the One Drop foundation.

Laliberté has lost the most money on online poker cash games. Over his six accounts, noataima, patatino, lady marmelade, elmariachimacho, Esvedra and Zypherin, Laliberté has lost approximately US$31,000,000.

=== Spaceflight ===
In September 2009, Laliberté became the first Canadian space tourist. He launched on the Soyuz TMA-16 spacecraft and landed in the Soyuz TMA-14 spacecraft. His spaceflight was dedicated to raising awareness on water issues facing humankind. The event was accompanied by a 120-minute webcast program featuring various artistic performances in 14 cities on five continents, including the International Space Station.

In May 2020, Canada's Federal Court of Appeals ruled that his trip should be considered primarily personal, and not work related, and directed that income tax be assessed on 90% of the cost of the trip. The cost of the spaceflight was $41,816,954.

In June 2011, Laliberté published a book, entitled Gaia, containing photos of Earth from his space flight. Proceeds from his book were to go to the One Drop Foundation.

=== Atoll of Nukutepipi ===
In 2007, Laliberté became the owner of the atoll of Nukutepipi in the French Polynesia. In May 2014, Laliberté told the Journal de Montréal that he wanted to make the atoll a shelter that could accommodate his family and friends in the event of a global catastrophe. "Because of all that's happening in the world, I said to myself: that could be the place where, in case of an epidemic or a total war, I could bring people I like and my family so that we'd be protected. It will be completely autonomous in terms of operation: solar, environmental, ecologic, all that."

On 13 November 2019, following his arrest for cannabis cultivation, Laliberté's investment firm Lune Rouge stated that "Laliberté is being questioned in respect of cultivation of cannabis for his personal use only at the residence on the island of Nukutepipi" in Tahiti.

== Awards and honours ==
In 1997, Laliberté was appointed Knight of the National Order of Quebec (CQ).

In 2001, he was named a Great Montrealer by the Académie des Grands Montréalais, and received the Queen Elizabeth II Golden Jubilee Medal in 2002. In 2003, he was honored by the Condé Nast group as part of the Never Follow Program, a tribute to creators and innovators.

In the 2004 Canadian honours, he was appointed Officer of the Order of Canada (OC) by the Governor General of Canada. The same year, he was recognized by Time magazine as one of the 100 most influential people in the world.

In 2006, Laliberté won the Ernst & Young Entrepreneur of the Year award for all three levels: Quebec, Canada and international. In 2007, he was named Ernst & Young World Entrepreneur Of The Year.

Université Laval (Québec) awarded him an honorary doctorate in 2008. On 22 November 2010, he and Cirque du Soleil were honoured with the 2,424th star on the Hollywood Walk of Fame. Laliberté received the Queen Elizabeth II Diamond Jubilee Medal in 2012.

== Personal life ==
Laliberté's son Kami is a racing driver competing in the European junior formulae. He recorded one race victory in F4 but has no record of racing after 2017. His daughter Naïma is a competitive dressage rider.
