= Jeffrey Williams (astronaut) =

American astronaut and US Army officer (born 1958)

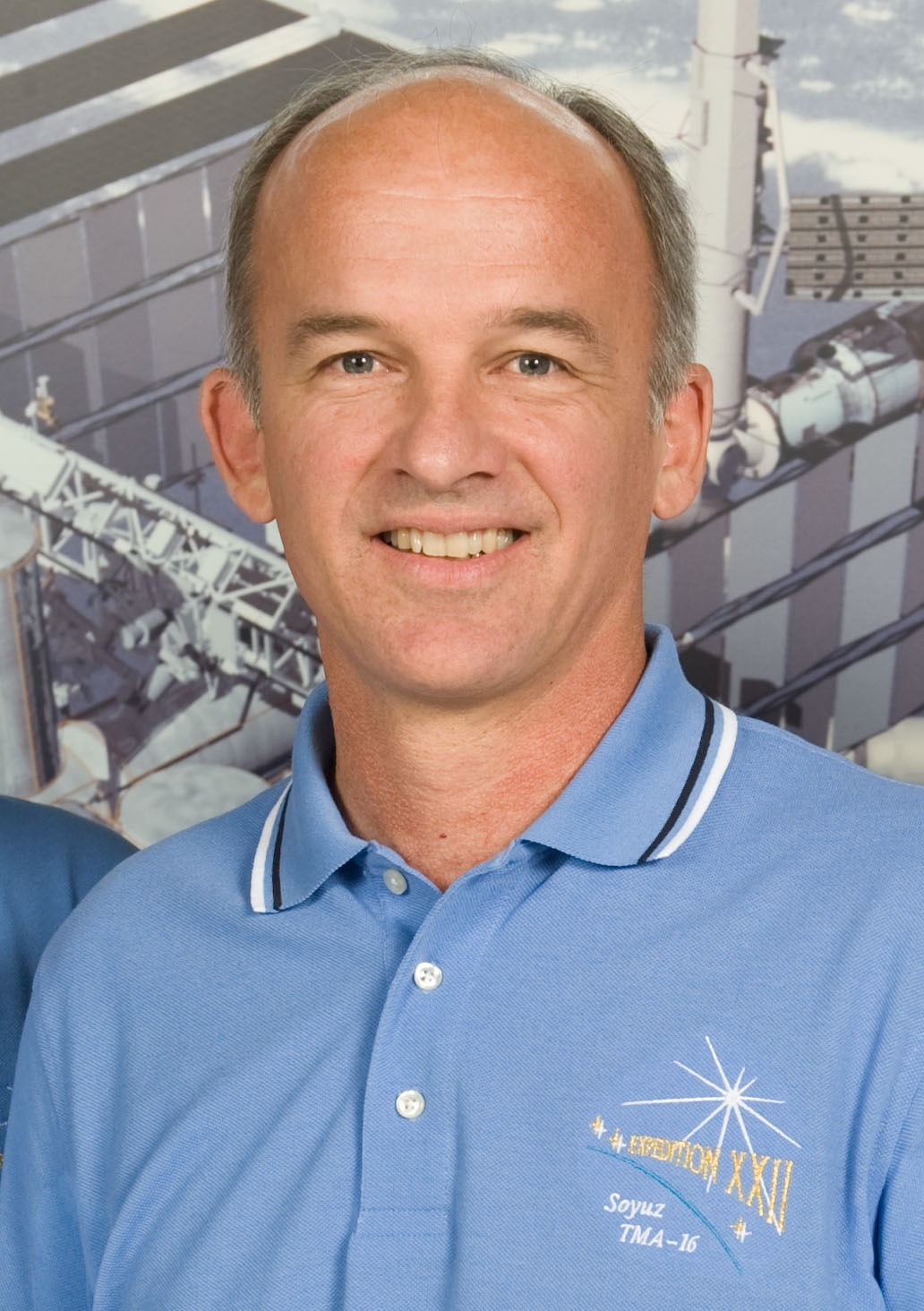
- Williams in 2009
- Born: Jeffrey Nels Williams; January 18, 1958 (age 68); Superior, Wisconsin, U.S.
- Education: United States Military Academy (BS) Naval Postgraduate School (MS) Naval War College (MA)
- Space career

NASA astronaut
- Rank: Colonel, USA
- Time in space: 534d 2h 48m
- Selection: NASA Group 16 (1996)
- Total EVAs: 5
- Total EVA time: 31h 55m
- Missions: STS-101; Soyuz TMA-8 (Expedition 13); Soyuz TMA-16 (Expedition 21/22); Soyuz TMA-20M (Expedition 47/48)
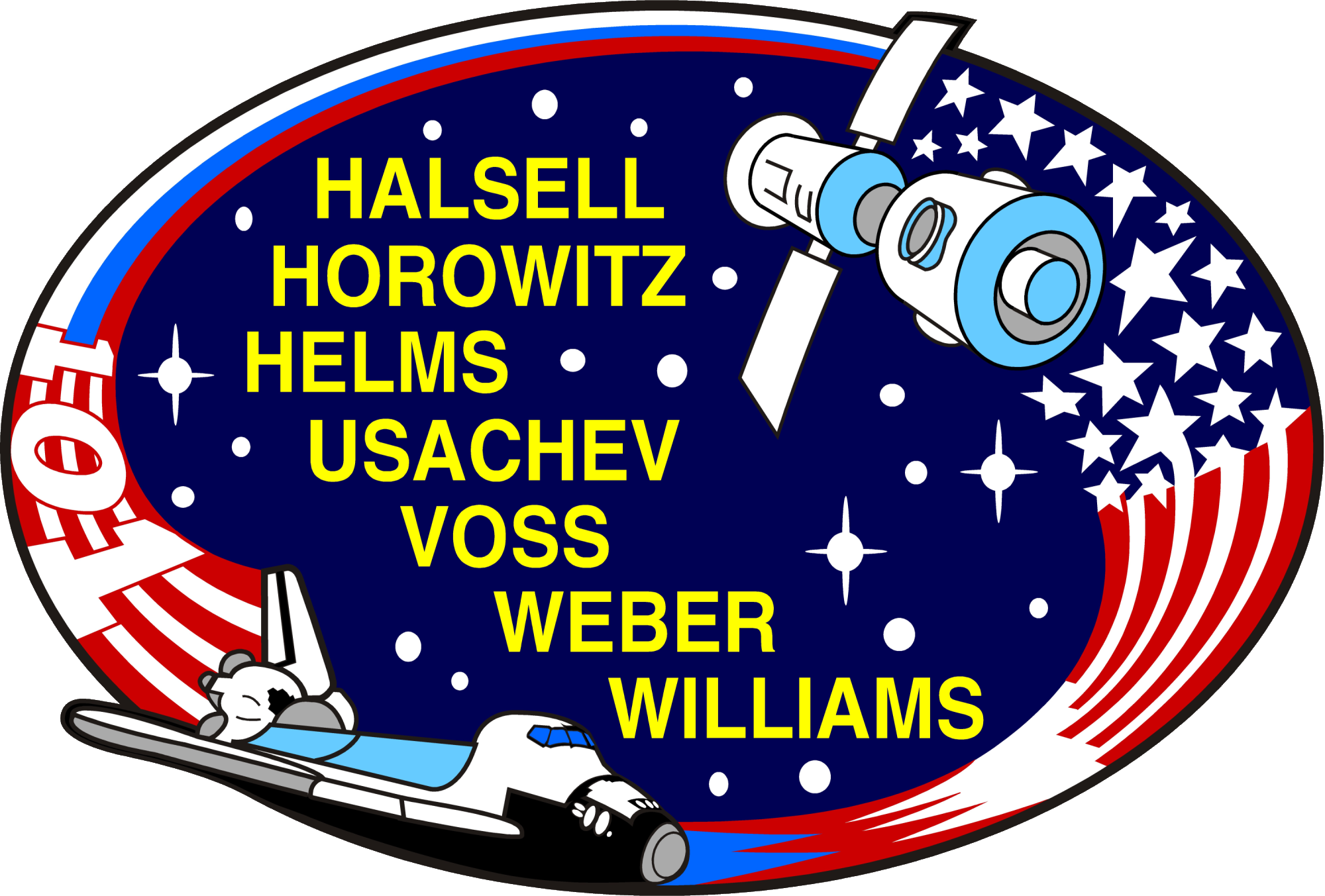
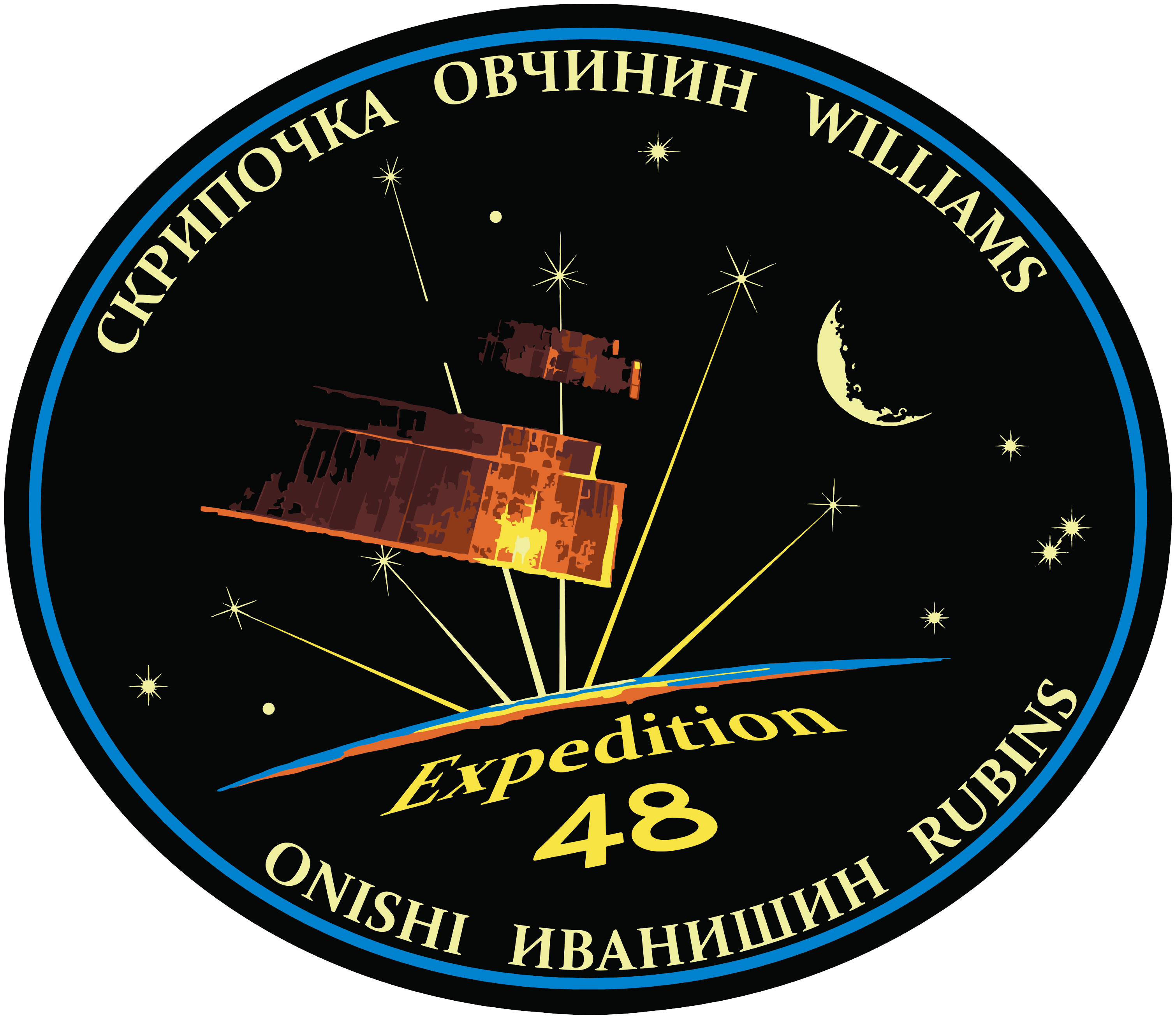
- Mission insignia
- Retired: January 14, 2024

Jeffrey Nels Williams (born January 18, 1958) is a retired United States Army officer and former NASA astronaut. He is a veteran of four space flights and formerly held the American record for most days spent in space, which was surpassed in April 2017 by his colleague Peggy Whitson.

== Early life and education ==
Williams was born in Superior, Wisconsin, and raised in Winter, Wisconsin. During his childhood, Williams reached the rank of Star Scout, the third-highest in the Boy Scouts of America. During the Jamboree on the Air in October 2009 he communicated with Boy Scouts in the National Scouting Museum in Texas from the International Space Station. Williams graduated from Winter High School in Winter, Wisconsin, in 1976. He earned a degree in applied science and engineering from the U.S. Military Academy in 1980, receiving his commission in the United States Army. He later received a degree in aeronautical engineering from the Naval Postgraduate School and a degree in National Security and Strategic Studies from the U.S. Naval War College in 1987 and 1996 respectively.

== NASA career ==
Williams served with the Army at Johnson Space Center from 1987 to 1992 before training as a test pilot. In 1996, he was selected by NASA as an astronaut candidate. In July 2002, Williams served as the commander of the NEEMO 3 mission aboard the Aquarius underwater laboratory, living and working underwater for six days.

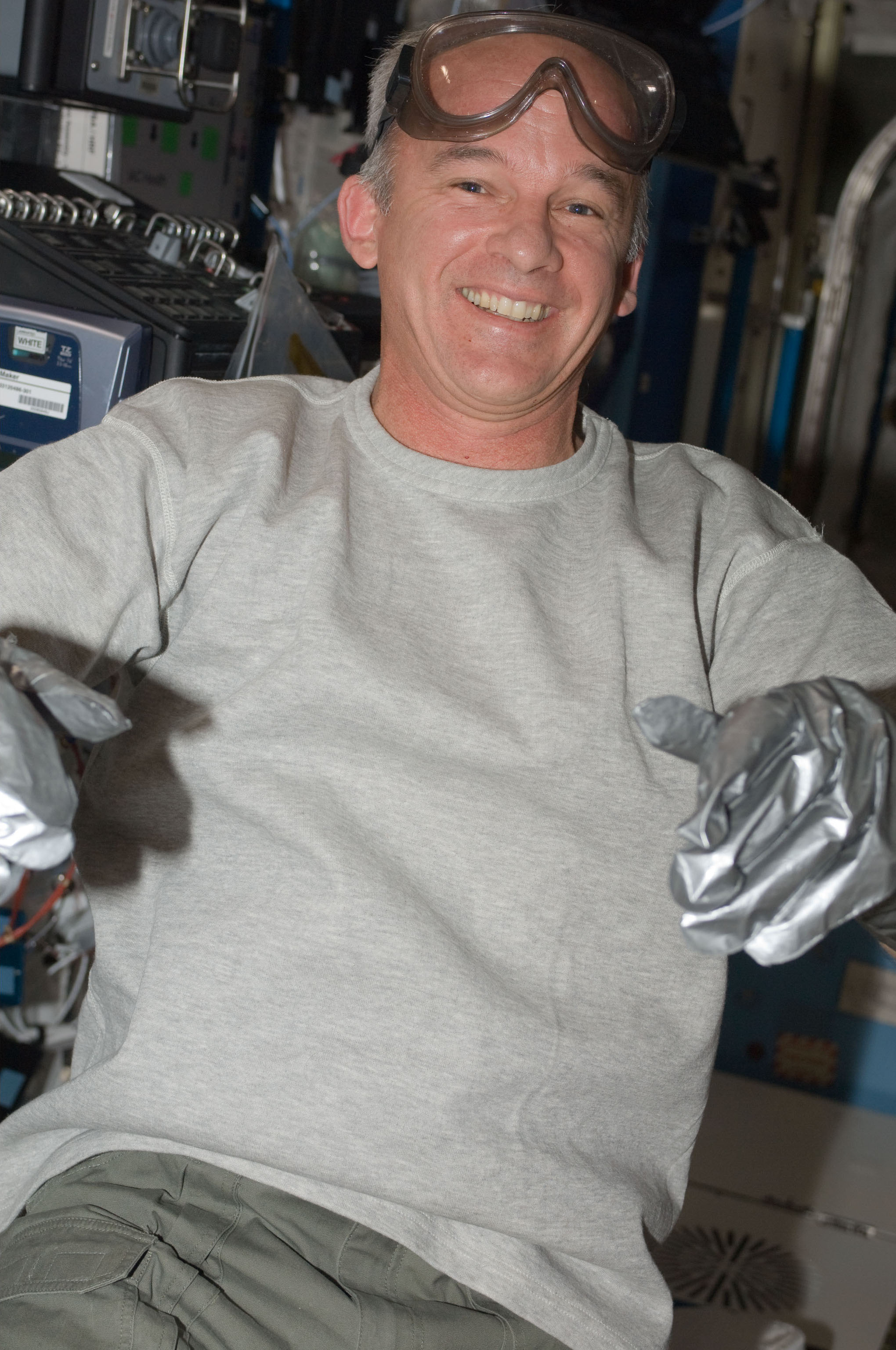
Williams in the Destiny laboratory module during Expedition 21

=== STS-101 ===
In 2000, Williams launched to space for the first time on STS-101. STS-101 delivered supplies to the International Space Station, hauled up using a Spacehab double module and an Integrated Cargo Carrier pallet. Williams and fellow crew member James Voss performed a spacewalk and then reboosted the station from 230 miles (370 km) to 250 miles (400 km). They returned to Earth after over 9 days on orbit.

=== Expedition 13 ===
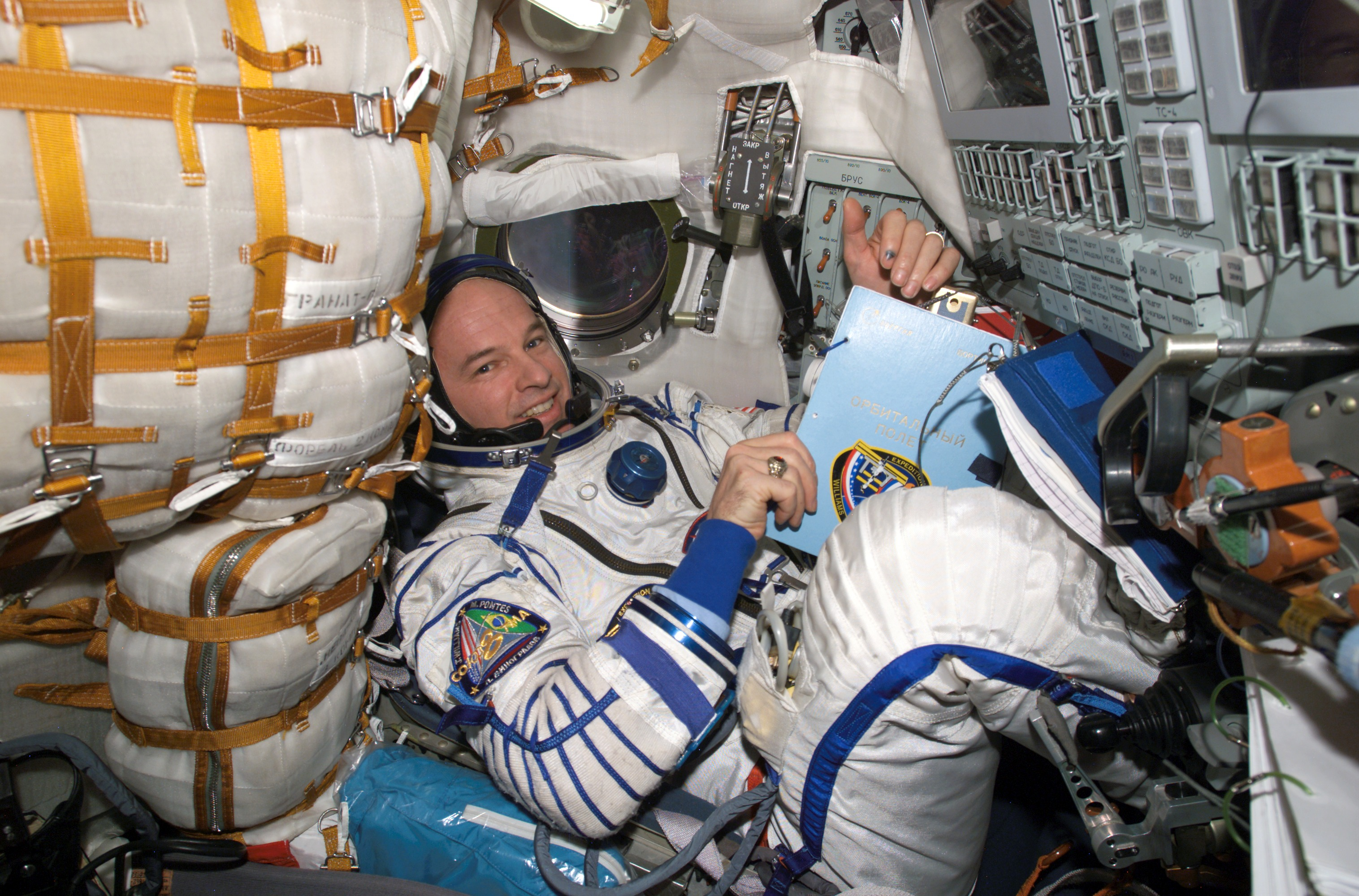
Williams onboard Soyuz TMA-8

Williams also flew aboard the Soyuz TMA-8 mission, replacing Expedition 12 astronaut William S. McArthur. He was previously in orbit as the Expedition 13 flight engineer and science officer aboard the International Space Station. He returned to Earth on September 28, 2006.

During his six-month stint at the International Space Station in 2006, Williams orbited the Earth more than 2,800 times. During Expedition 13, he worked on hundreds of experiments, walked in space twice, and captured more photographs of the Earth than any other astronaut in history. Many of his photos are found in his book The Work of His Hands: A View of God's Creation from Space, where he shares personal narrative and vivid photos of the Earth.

On August 24, 2006, a taped message made by him to be played at an official NASA press conference was accidentally played over the air-to-ground loop, the tape revealing that the Crew Exploration Vehicle under development to replace the Space Shuttle after 2010 would be named Orion after the famed wintertime constellation.

=== Expedition 21/22 ===
Williams also served as a flight engineer for Expedition 21 and assumed command of Expedition 22 in November 2009 having arrived on the International Space Station with his crew mates via Soyuz TMA-16 which launched on September 30, 2009. Williams with Expedition 22 Flight Engineer Maksim Surayev landed their Soyuz TMA-16 spacecraft on the steppes of Kazakhstan on March 18, 2010, wrapping up a 167-day stay aboard the Space Station.

==== First live tweetup from space ====
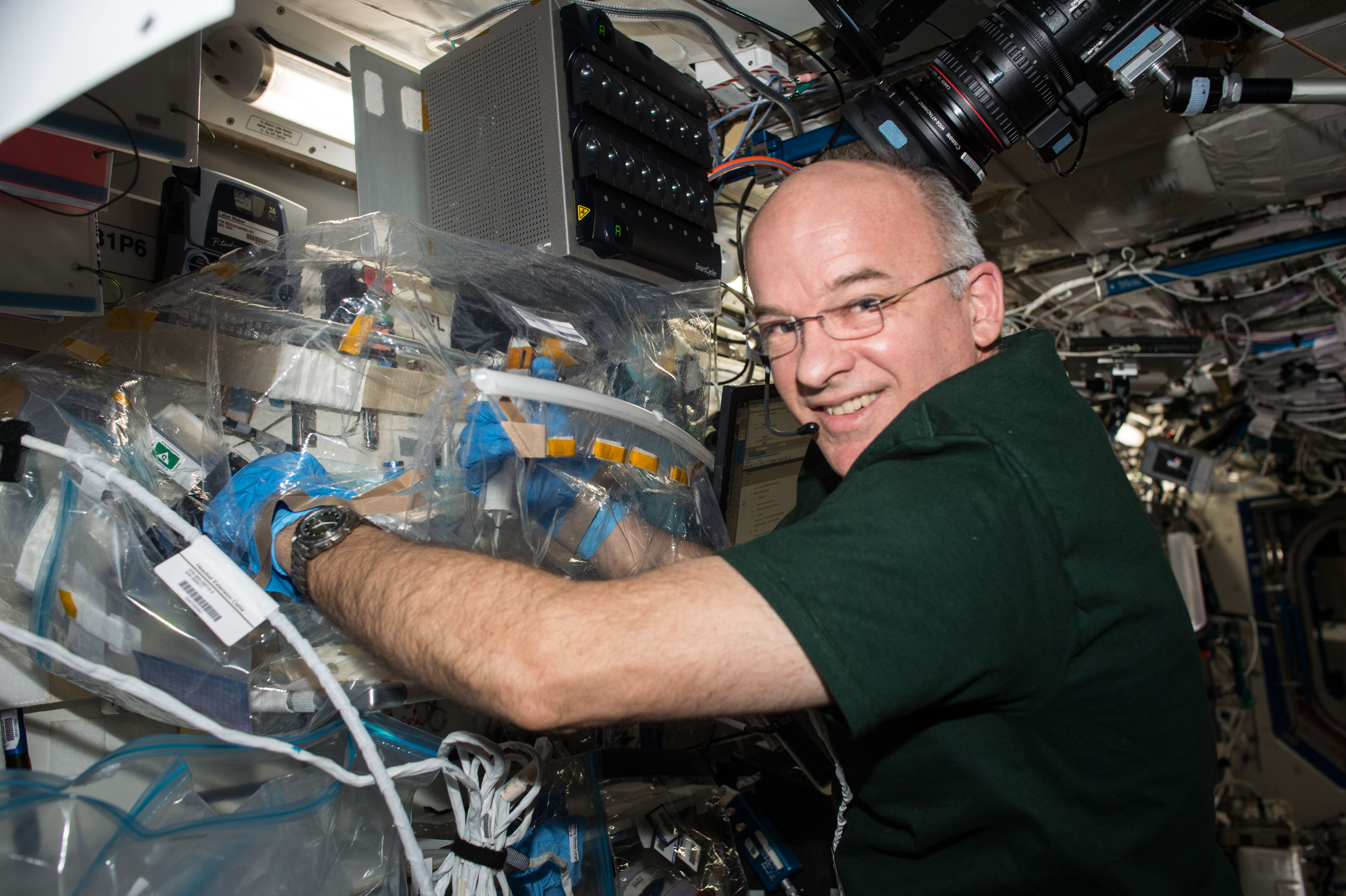
Williams at work in the Destiny laboratory

On October 21, 2009, Williams and his Expedition 21 crewmate, Nicole Stott, participated in the first NASA Tweetup from the station with members of the public gathered at NASA Headquarters in Washington, D.C. This involved the first live Twitter connection for the astronauts. Previously, astronauts on board the Space Shuttle or ISS have sent the messages they desire to send as tweets down to Mission Control which then posted the message via the Internet to Twitter.

=== Expedition 47/48 ===
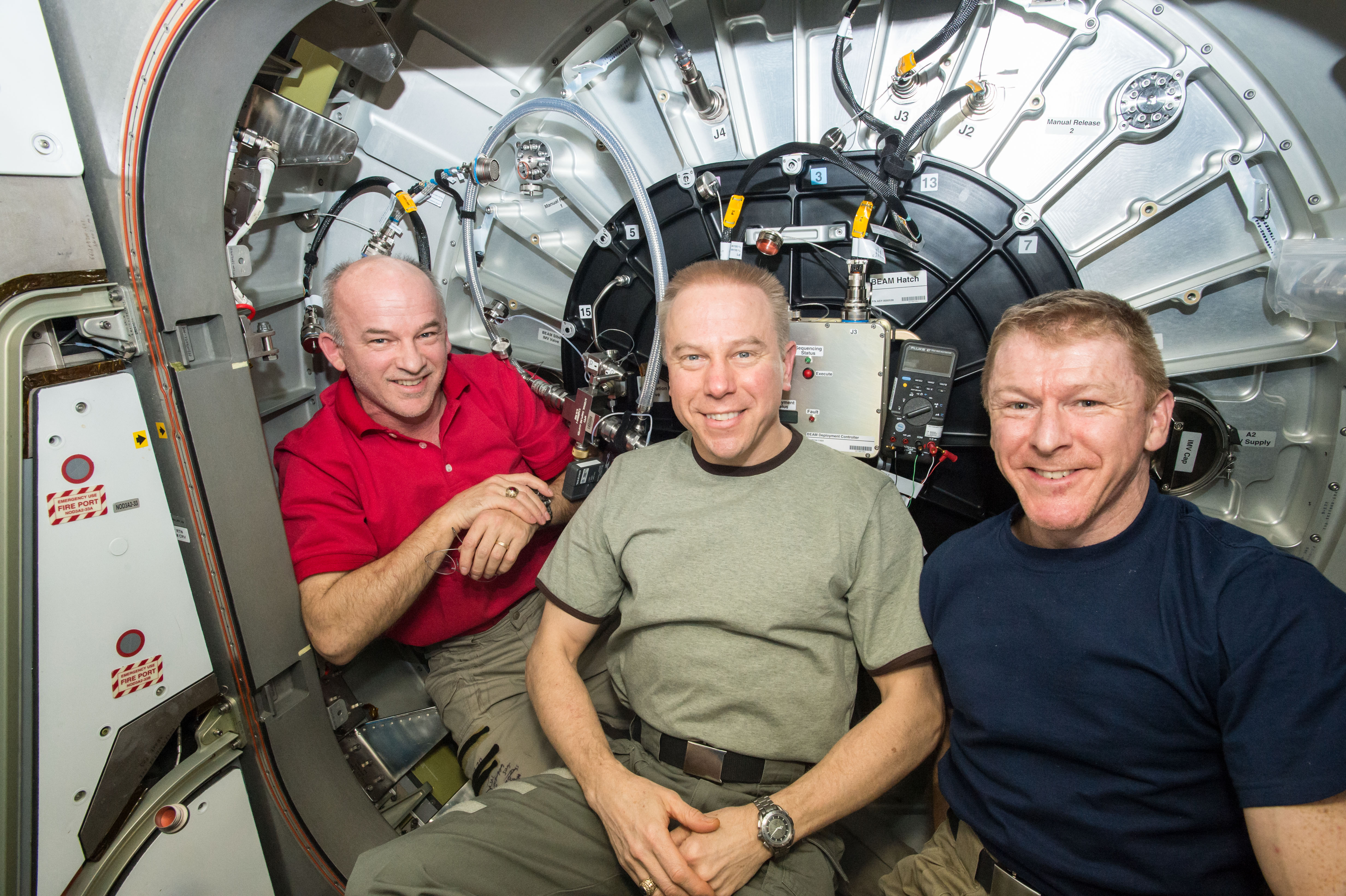
Williams with crew mates Tim Peake and Tim Kopra at the entrance to the BEAM

Williams returned to space station in 2016 as part of Expedition 47/48. Upon the departure of Soyuz TMA-19M he became commander of Expedition 48. Williams was returned to Earth safely on 6 September 2016.

On Expedition 47, Williams surpassed Scott Kelly's record of 520 cumulative days in space, which was set when he returned from space on March 1, 2016; Williams beat this record with 534 cumulative days.

Williams retired from NASA on January 14, 2024 after more than 27 years of service at the agency.

== Personal life ==
Williams is a committed Christian. Following his return from the Expedition 21 mission, he wrote the book The Work of His Hands: A View Of God's Creation From Space about his experience in space. The book reflects in Williams words the "vivid lessons about the meticulous goodness of divine providence, God's care for His creation, and His wisdom in ordering the universe". He is married to Anne-Marie Williams.

== Awards and decorations ==
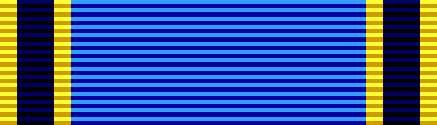
Defense Superior Service Medal with oak leaf cluster
Legion of Merit with oak leaf cluster
Meritorious Service Medal with oak leaf cluster
Army Commendation Medal
National Defense Service Medal with award star
Army Service Ribbon
NASA Distinguished Service Medal
NASA Exceptional Service Medal
NASA Space Flight Medal with two oak leaf clusters

Preceded by Frank De Winne	ISS Commander (Expedition 22); 30 November 2009 to 17 March 2010	Succeeded by Oleg Kotov
Preceded by Timothy Kopra	ISS Commander (Expedition 48); 18 June to 6 September 2016	Succeeded by Anatoli Ivanishin
