= Missão Centenário =

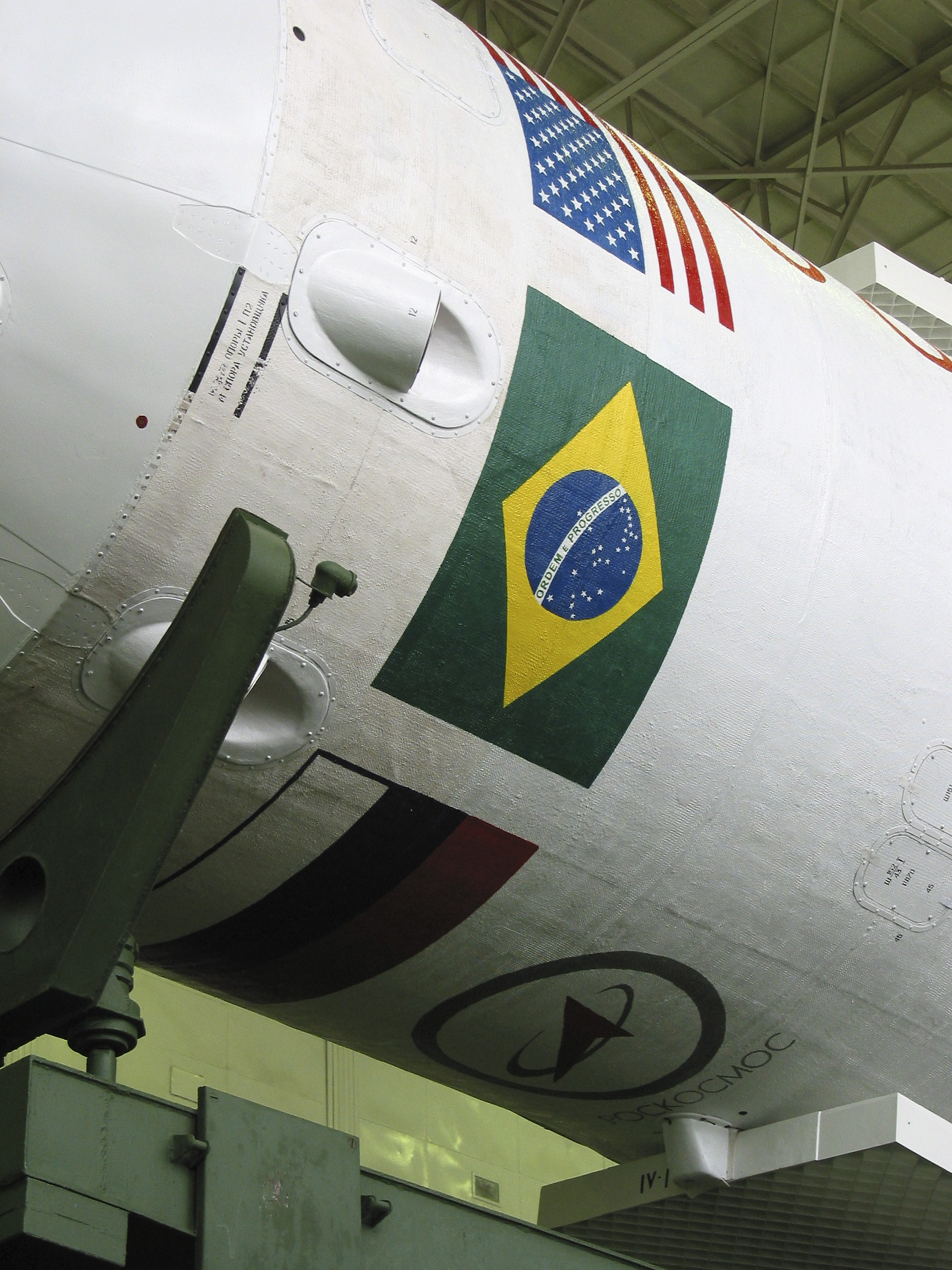
- Brazilian flag at the side of the rocket.
- Mission type: Short duration flight
- Mission duration: 9d 21h 16m
- Orbits completed: 155

Expedition
- Space station: International Space Station
- Began: March 30, 2006, 02:30:20 UTC (20 years ago)
- Ended: April 8, 2006, 23:47:12 UTC (20 years ago)
- Arrived aboard: Soyuz TMA-8
- Departed aboard: Soyuz TMA-7

Crew
- Crew size: 1
- Members: Marcos Pontes
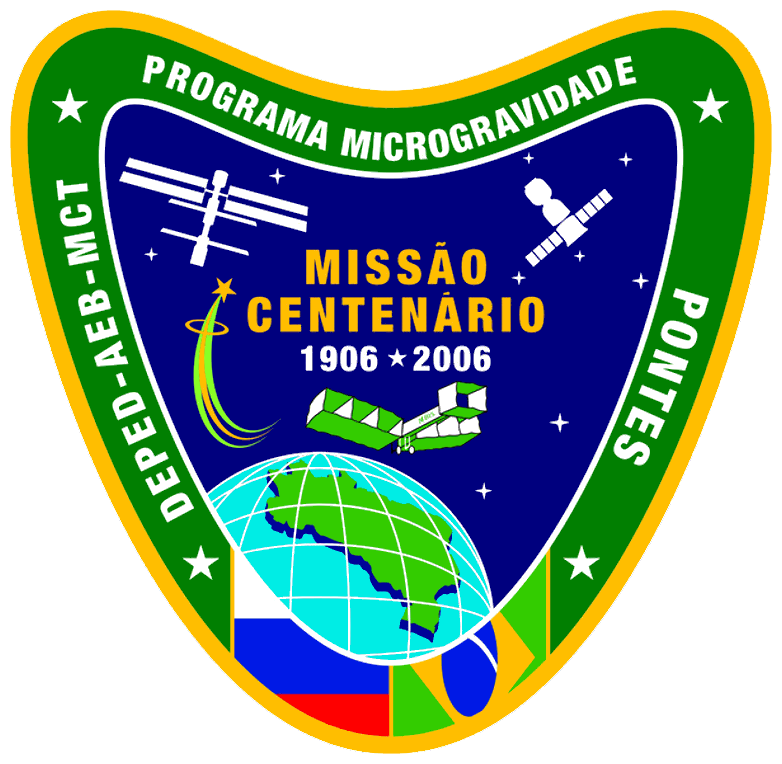
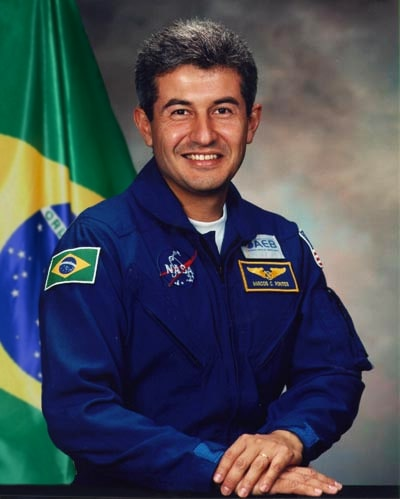
- Marcos Pontes Visiting expeditions

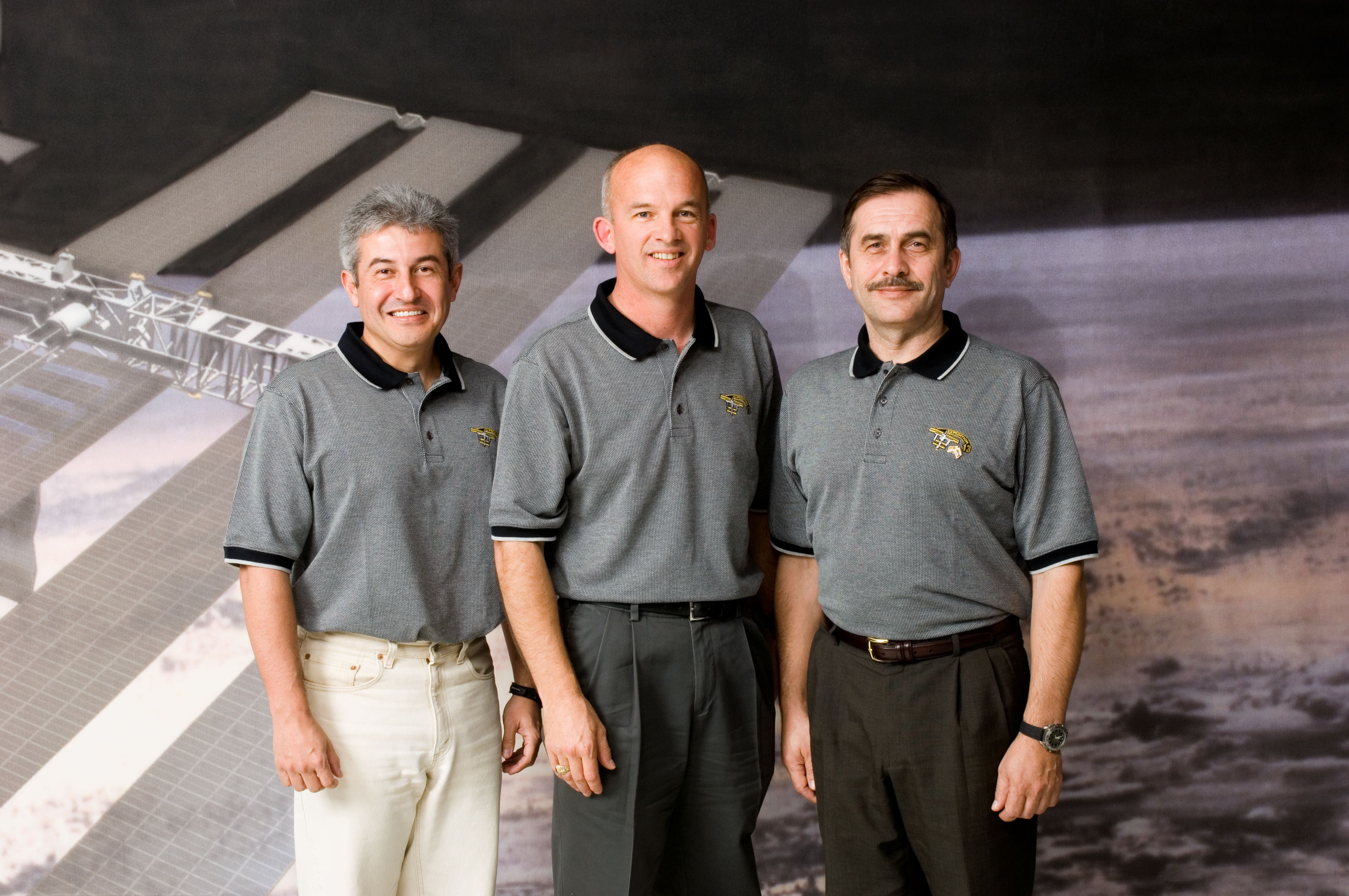
Astronaut Marcos Pontes (left), from the Brazilian Space Agency; astronaut Jeffrey Williams, official and flight engineer, from NASA; and cosmonaut Pavel Vinogradov, commander, from the Russian Federal Space Agency, in the Johnson Space Center.

The Missão Centenário was born of an agreement between the Brazilian Space Agency (AEB) and the Russian Federal Space Agency on October 18, 2005. The main objective of this treaty would be to send the first Brazilian into space, Lt. Col. Aviator Marcos Pontes.

The name of the mission is a reference to the commemoration of the centenary of the first crewed flight of a Brazilian-designed aircraft, the Santos-Dumont 14-bis, in Paris on October 23, 1906.

The vehicle used for launching the mission was the Soyuz TMA-8 spacecraft, and its launch took place on March 30, 2006 (11:30 p.m Brasília time) at the Baikonur Cosmodrome (Kazakhstan) to the International Space Station (ISS).

== Bilateral agreement for the mission ==
The Missão Centenário was made possible by a commercial agreement signed in October 2005 between Brazil and Russia, with representatives of the Brazilian Space Agency (AEB) and the Russian Federal Space Agency.

As a result, astronaut Marcos Cesar Pontes began training in Star City, a training center for cosmonauts near Moscow.

== Launch ==
The Soyuz TMA-8 spacecraft carrying Lieutenant Colonel Marcos Pontes was launched at 11:30 p.m. on March 30, 2006 (Brasília time, 8:30 p.m. in the morning of March 31, 2006 Kazakhstan time) . Besides the Brazilian astronaut, the crew were the Russian Pavel Vinogradov and the American Jeffrey Williams, these two members of Expedition 13.

When Pavel Vinagrodov hooked up the cabin video camera to Marcos Pontes during the launch, the Brazilian did not know what to say. He thought of waving, but that did not express what he felt, then he pointed to the flag and then up, meaning that they were all together, but he thought "wait a moment, pointing with one finger does not give the impression of 'together'!". So he pointed with two, as you can see in the video of the mission. The spacecraft docked with the International Space Station (ISS) in the early hours of Saturday, April 1.

Prior to entry to the International Space Station (ISS), the international protocol was that Pavel would enter first, followed by Jeff and then Marcos. But when Pavel noticed Marcos with the Brazilian flag in his hands, he told him to come in first. Marcos replied that they might have problems. To this, the Russian replied that it would not be Marcos who would be entering, but a whole nation, and neither he nor Jeff would have the right to enter before a nation.

== Experiments ==
Lt. Col. Marcos Pontes carried out eight scientific experiments while at the ISS, so that their behavior in a microgravity environment could be analyzed. The educational experiments were accompanied through the Internet by students from schools in São José dos Campos, while conducting the same experiments on the ground. The experiments performed were:

Name	Type	Researcher	Ref.
Biomedical research
GOSUM	(Seed) Germination in Microgravity (EMBRAPA)	Dra. Antonieta Nassif Salomão.	
Biotechnology research
DNARM	DNA Repair in Microgravity (UERJ and INPE)	Dr. Heitor Evangelista da Silva	
SMEK	Microgravity enzyme kinetics (FEI)	Dr. Alessandro La Neve	
NIP	Protein Interaction Clouds (CenPRA/MCT)	Dr. Aristides Pavani Filho	
Engineering research
CEMEX	Capillary Evaporator in Microgravity (UFSC)	Dr. Edson Bazzo	
WMHP	Miniature wire heat pipes (UFSC)	Dra. Márcia Barbosa Henriques Mantelli	
Educational projects
SEEDS	Germination of common bean seeds (Secretaria Municipal de Educação de São José dos Campos-SP)		
CHROPHYL	Observation of the Chlorophyll Chromatography Process in Weightlessness (Secretaria Municipal de Educação de São José dos Campos-SP)		

== Interviews ==
During his stay at the ISS, Pontes conducted some interviews by video-conference. On April 3, 2006, an interview was broadcast in honour of Alberto Santos-Dumont, in which Pontes used a Panama hat like the inventor and a handkerchief with the acronym "SD".

== Return ==
Pontes returned on Soyuz TMA-7, which landed during the night of April 8, 2006, Brasilia time, with two other astronauts from Expedition 12 (Russian Valery Tokarev and American William McArthur) who were already on the ISS. The landing point was 60–80 kilometres (37–50 mi) from Arkalyk in Kazakhstan. Seventeen Russian Mil Mi-8 helicopters were used during the astronauts’ recovery.

After the return, the three astronauts underwent a period of readaptation to gravity.

=== Total duration of the mission ===
Marcos Pontes performed 155 orbits and the total duration of his mission was 9 days, 21 hours and 17 minutes.

=== Patch ===
The patch of the Missão Centenário was produced jointly by Secom, MCT and AEB.

== Commemorative acts ==
As a celebration for this mission that was the first to bring a Brazilian astronaut into space, as well as being a tribute to the centenary of the first flight of an aircraft heavier than the air of Alberto Santos-Dumont in Europe, postage stamps and a medal were released.

== Criticism ==
The mission was criticized by part of the Brazilian scientific community, such as the Sociedade Brasileira para o Progresso da Ciência (SBPC), according to which the money invested in the mission should be used to train staff as well as investing in other types of scientific research. In addition, they report the non-compliance of the Brazilian participation in the construction of the ISS. Other critics denounced the political use and crossed out the trip as space tourism.

The Brazilian Space Agency and Marcos Pontes rebuffed these criticisms, saying that the space program has never had so much visibility in the press, which would make it possible in the future to allocate more funds for space exploration. In addition, the mission may encourage children to study and pursue a scientific career.

== Gallery ==
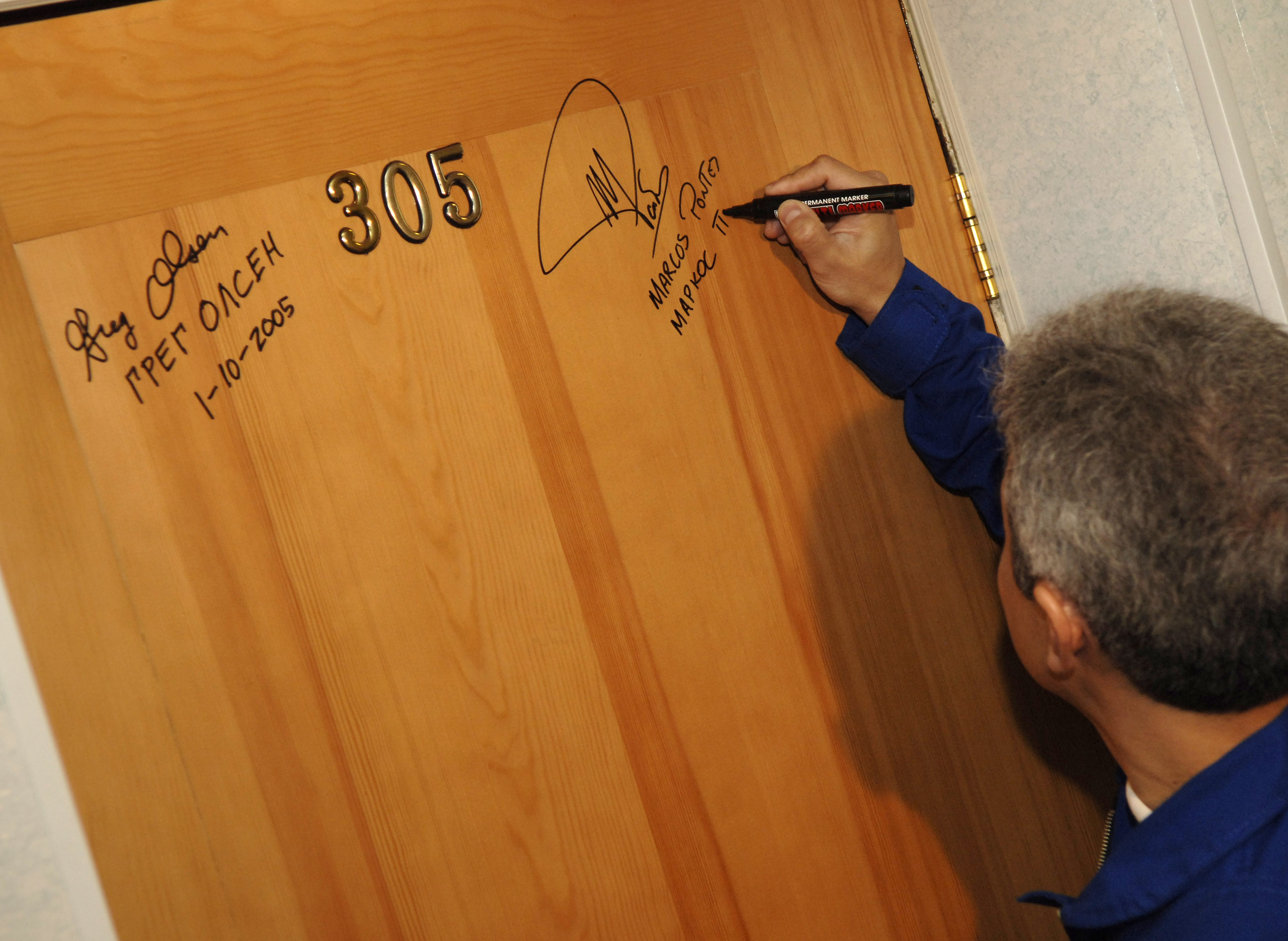
Pontes signing the Baikonur Cosmodrome checkout hotel room, an Astronaut/Cosmonaut tradition

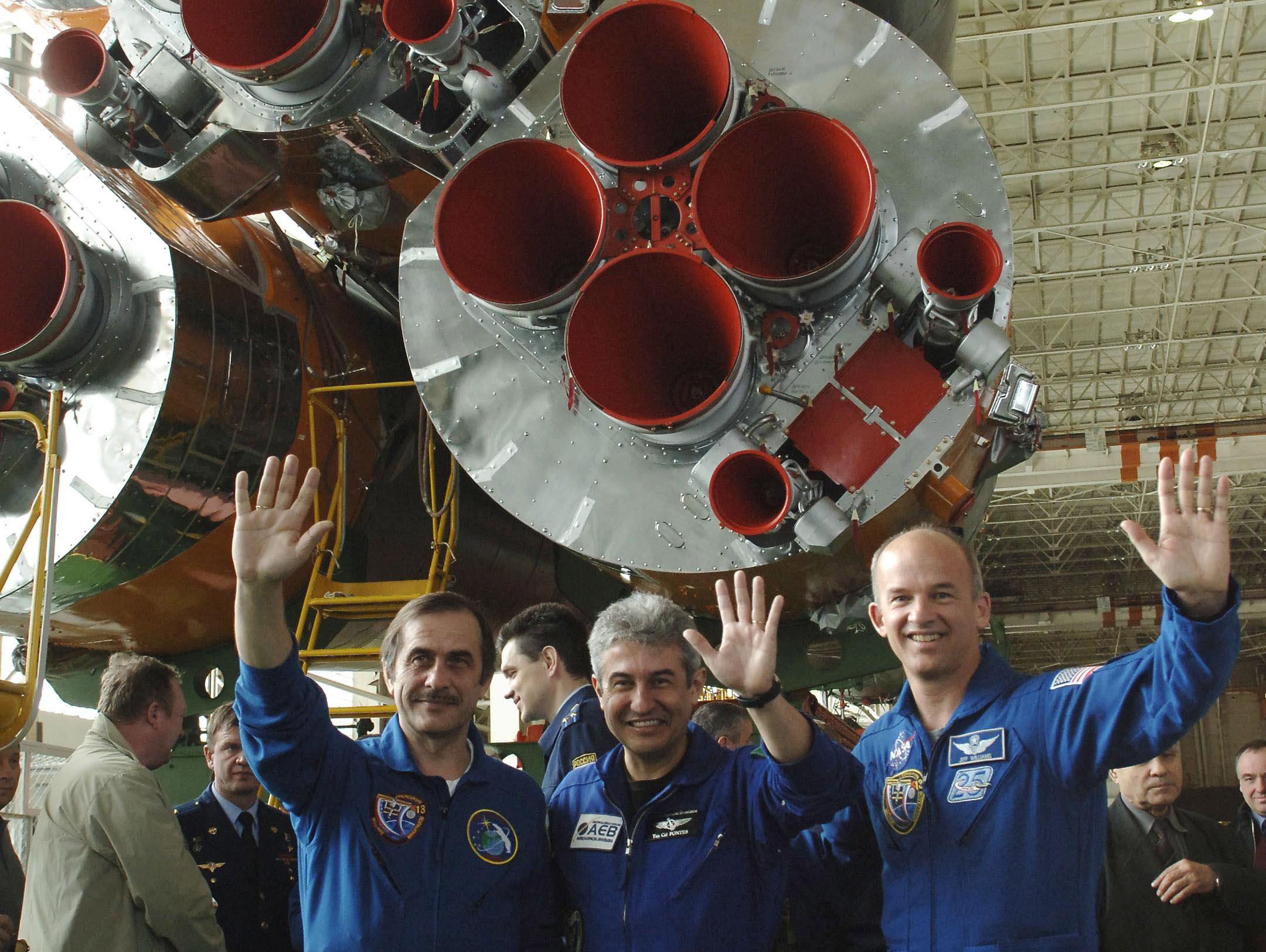
Marcos (center) with his crew members in the Soyuz factory

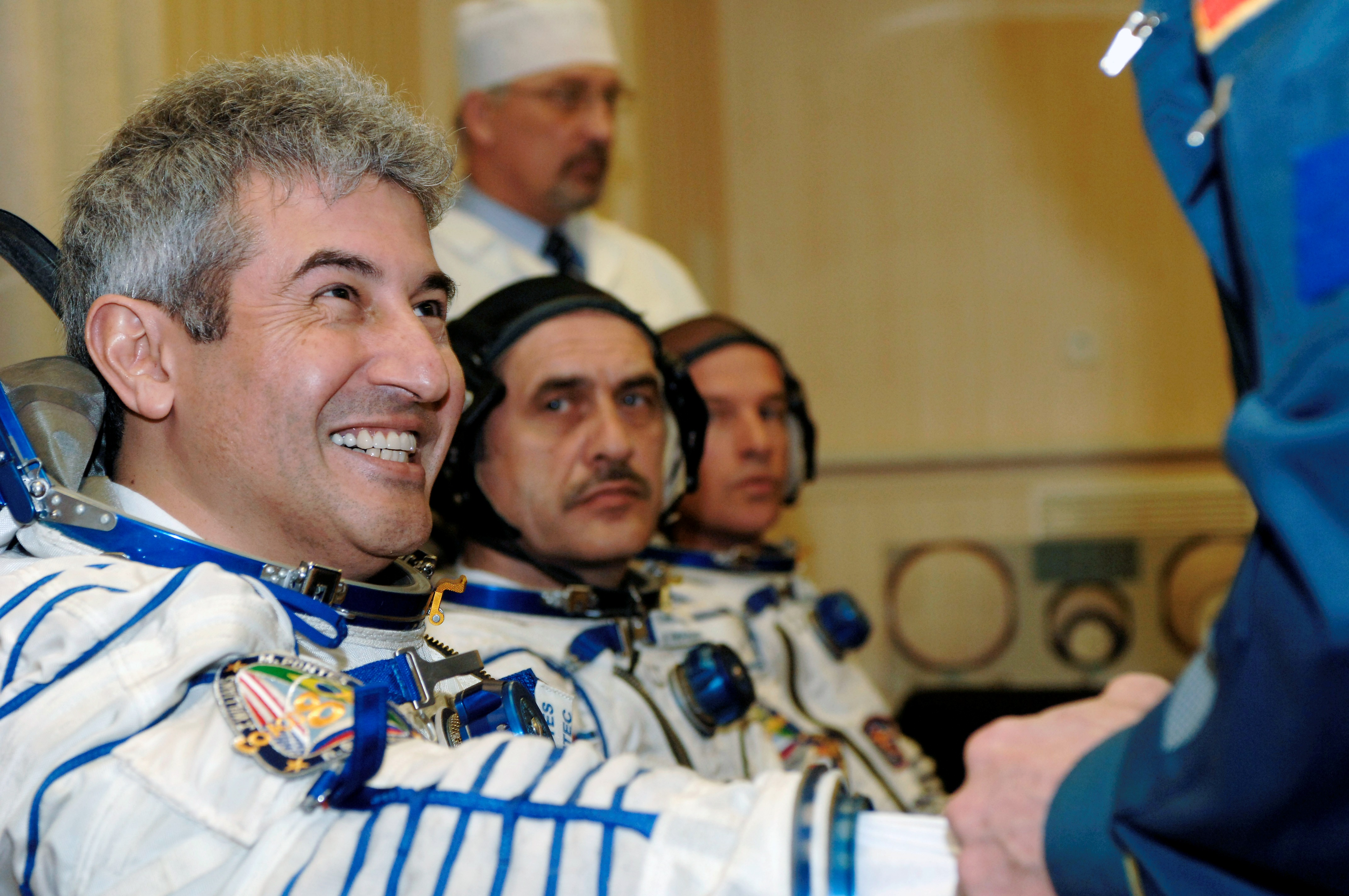
Greeting guests while at Baikonur on launch day

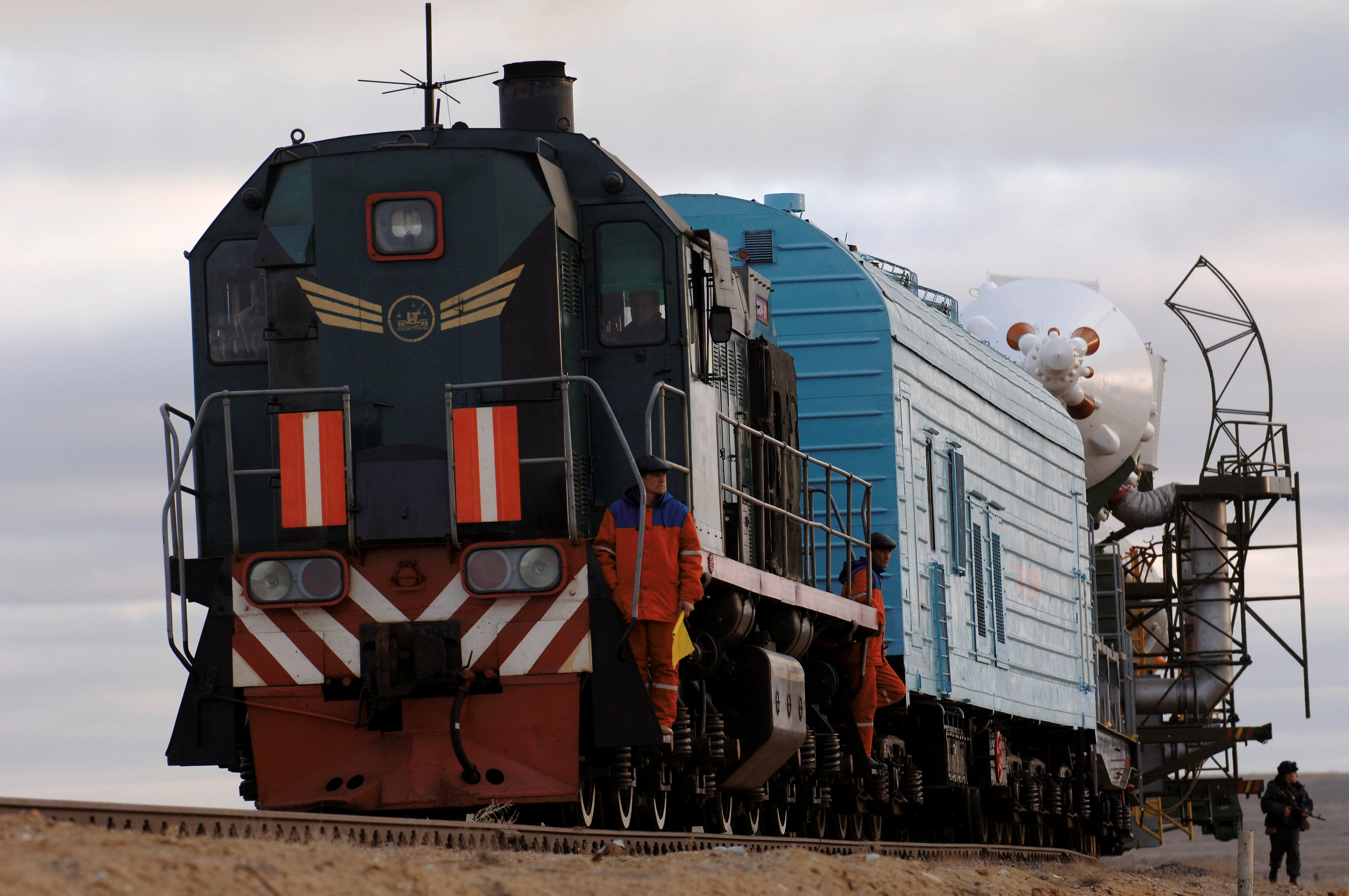
Train bringing the rocket to the launching area

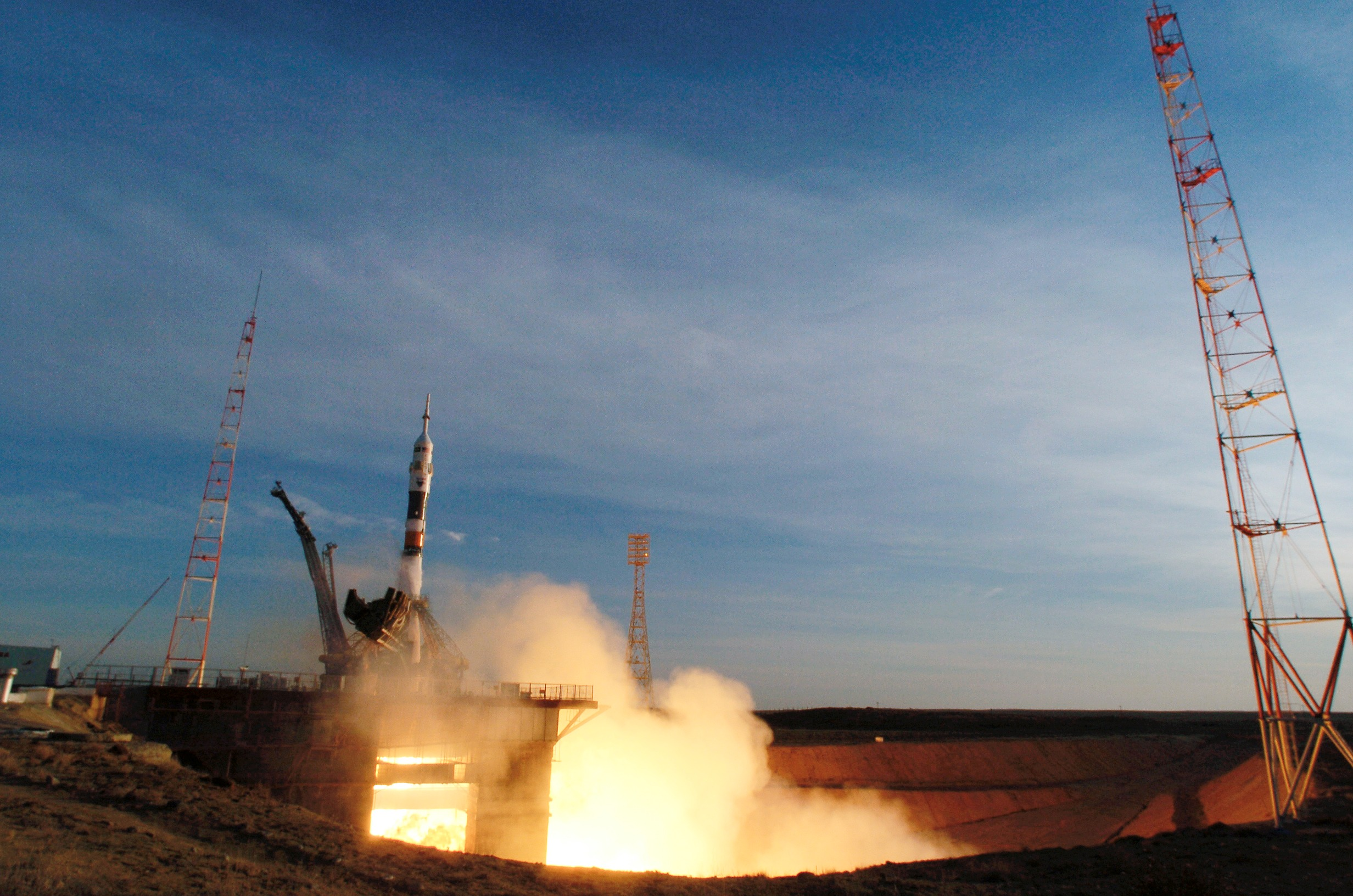
Launch of Soyuz TMA-8 on March 30, 2006

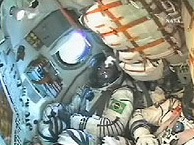
Pontes inside the Soyuz during launch to the ISS

ISS Conference

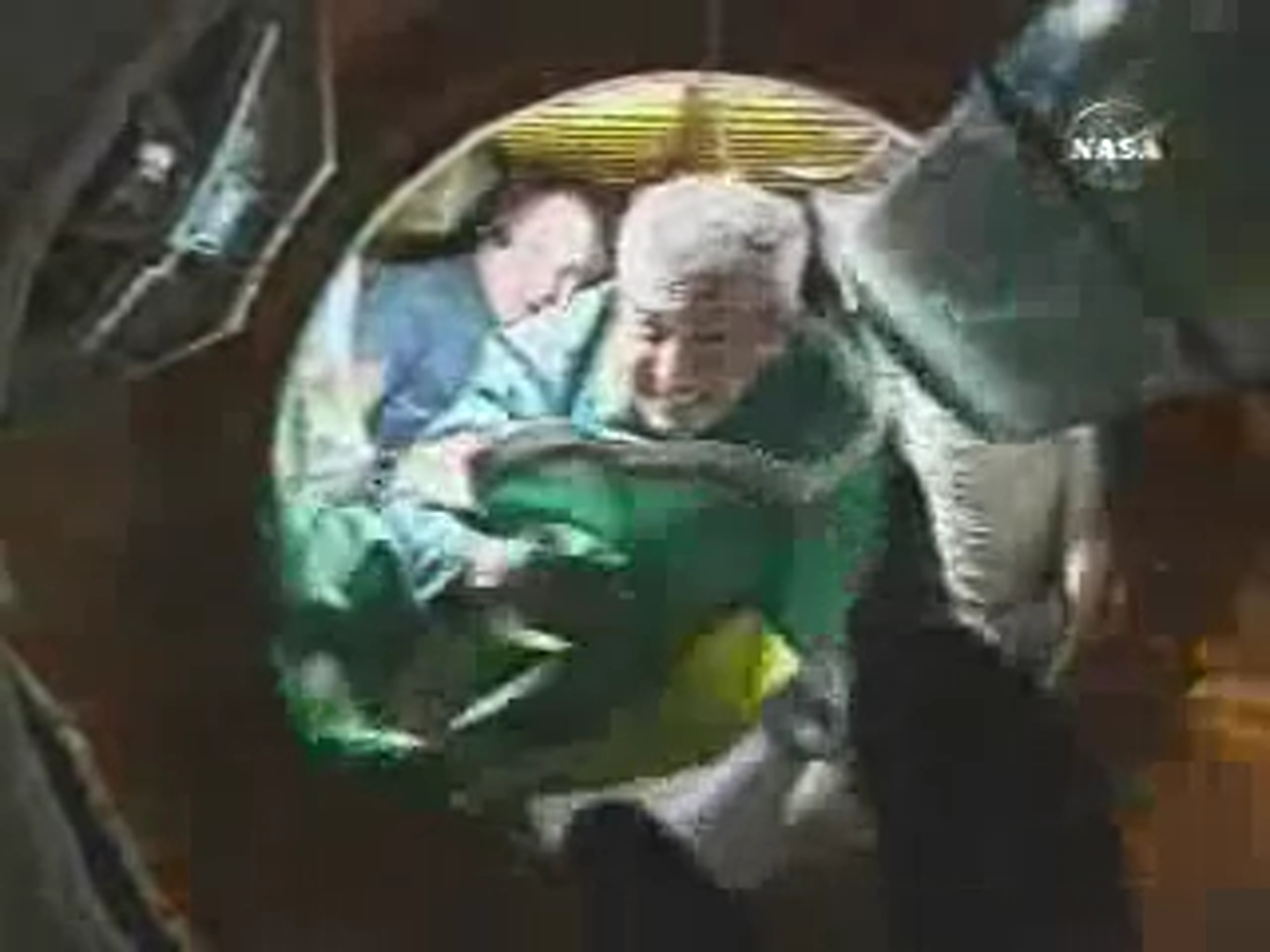
Hatch opening

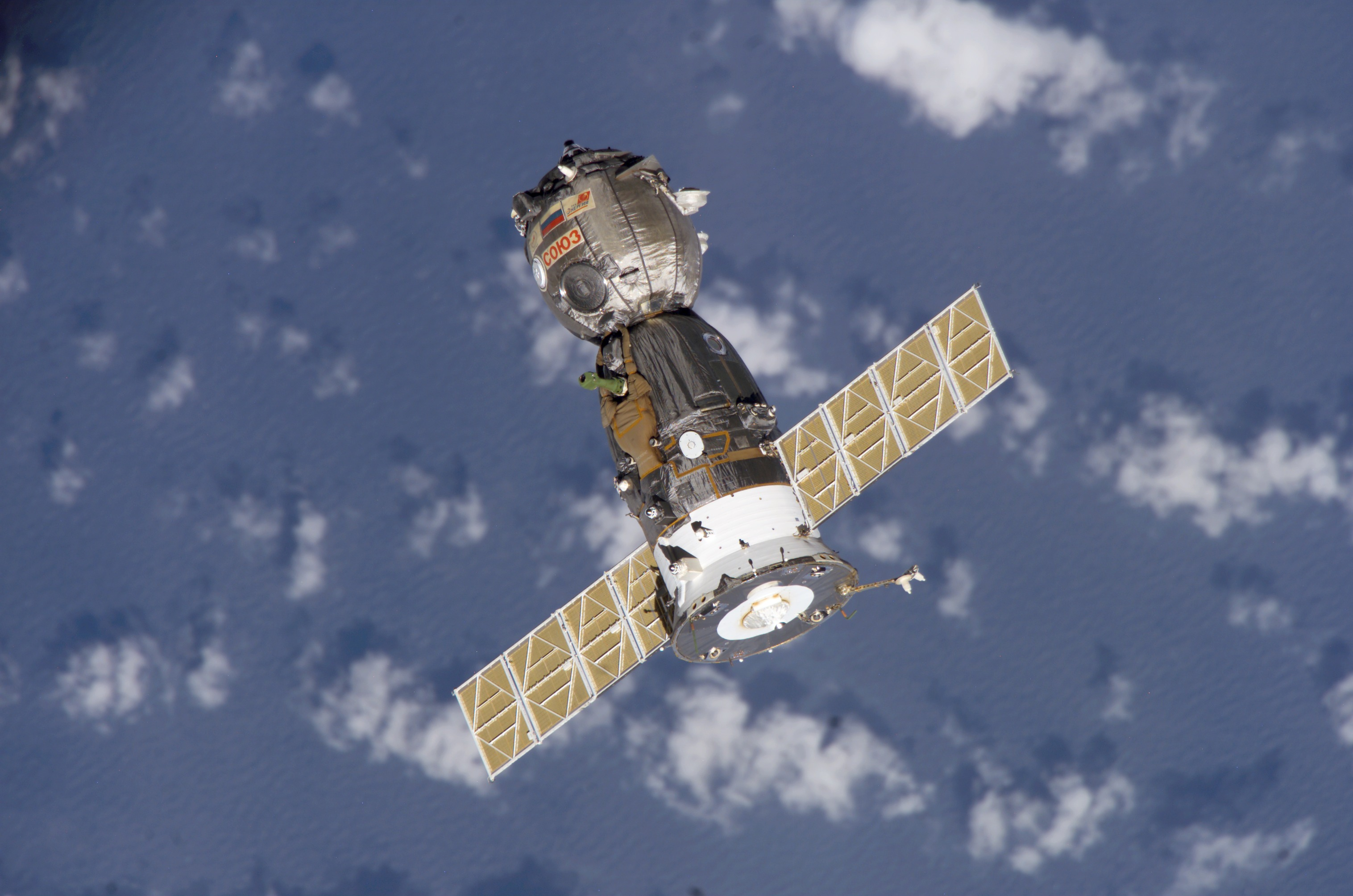
Soyuz TMA-7 leaving the Station with the Brazilian astronaut

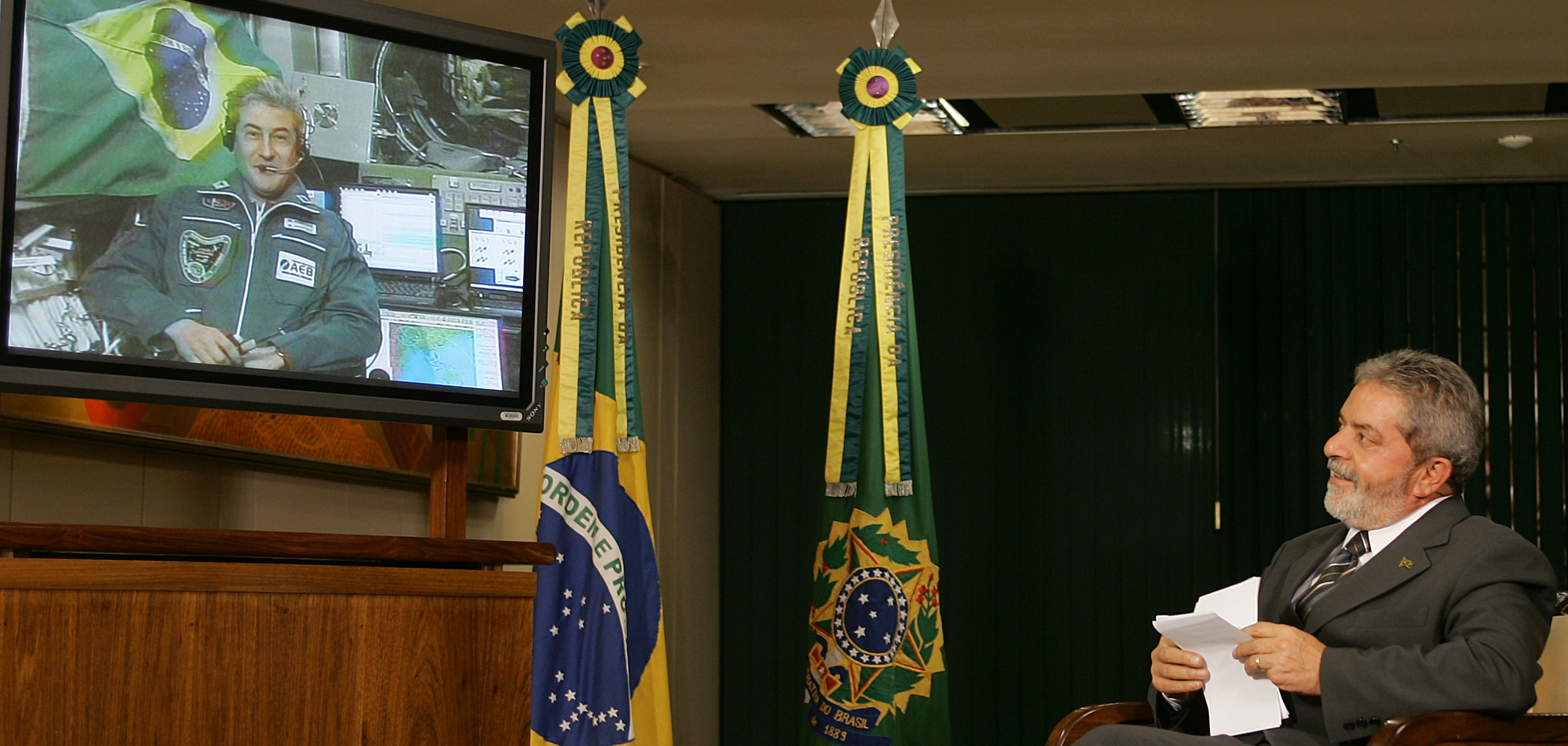
President Lula during a video-conference with Pontes.

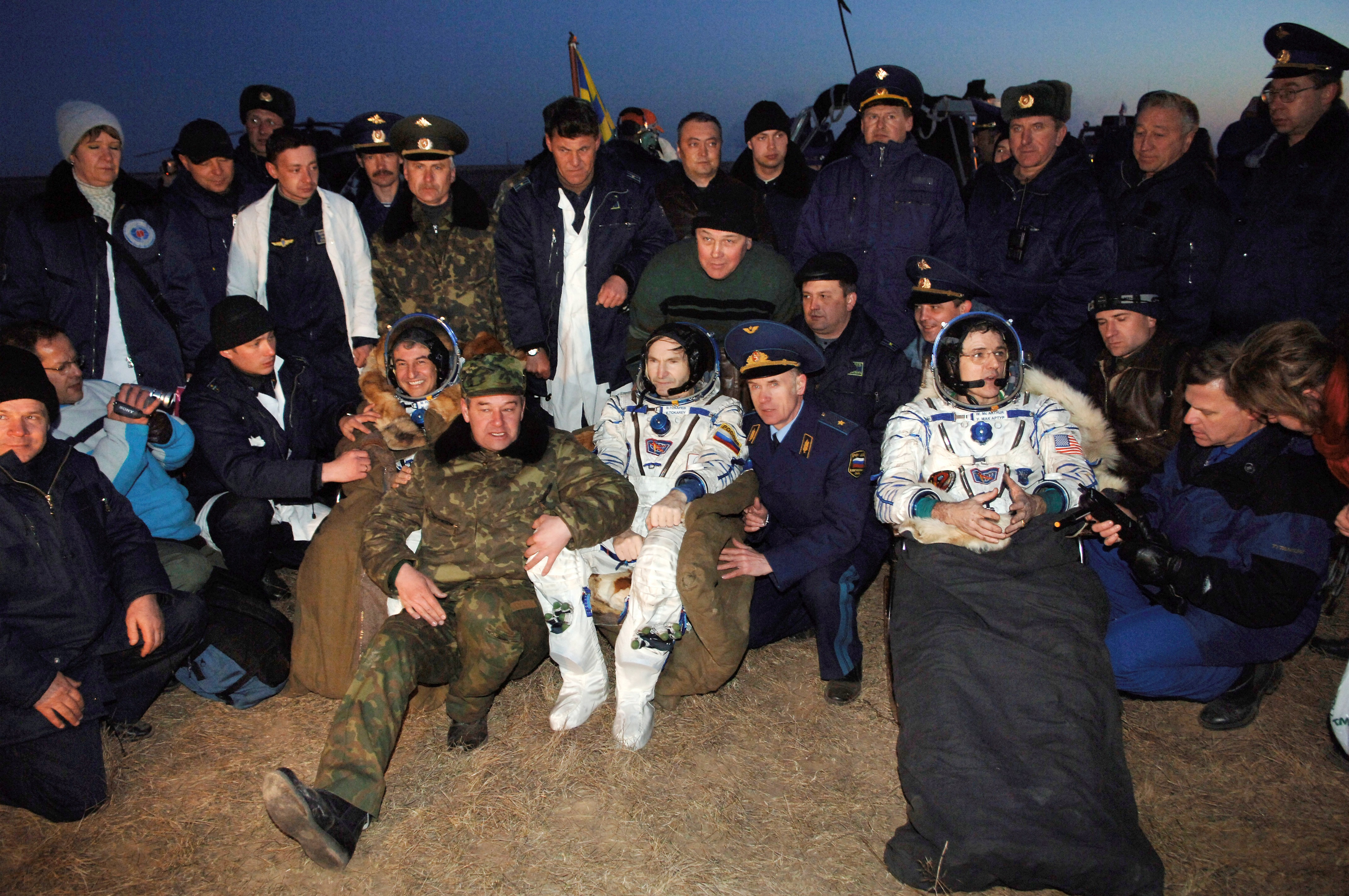
Crew from Soyuz TMA-7 after landing with Pontes

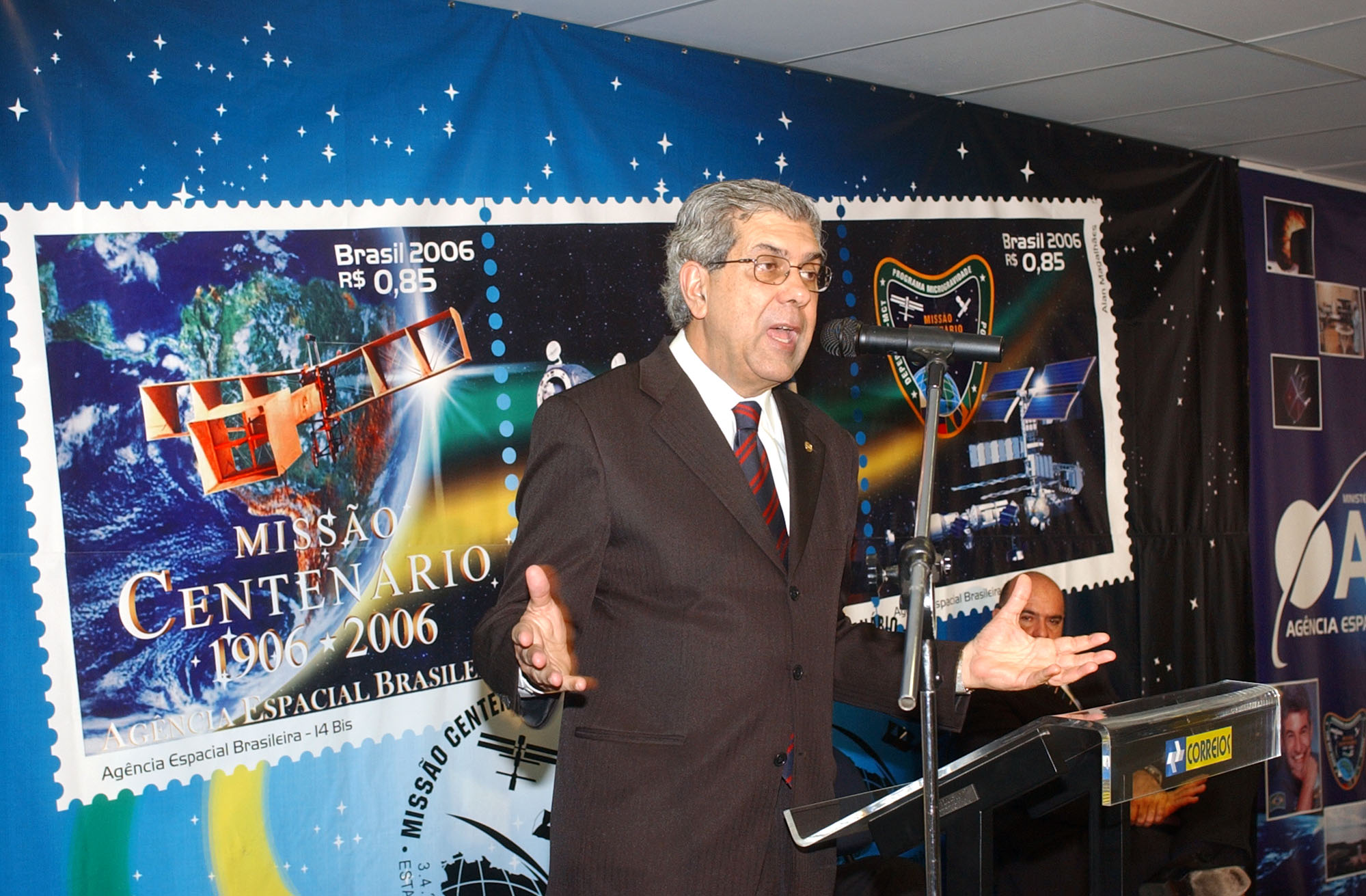
Speech by Sergio Gaudenzi during the launch of commemorative stamp and medal.

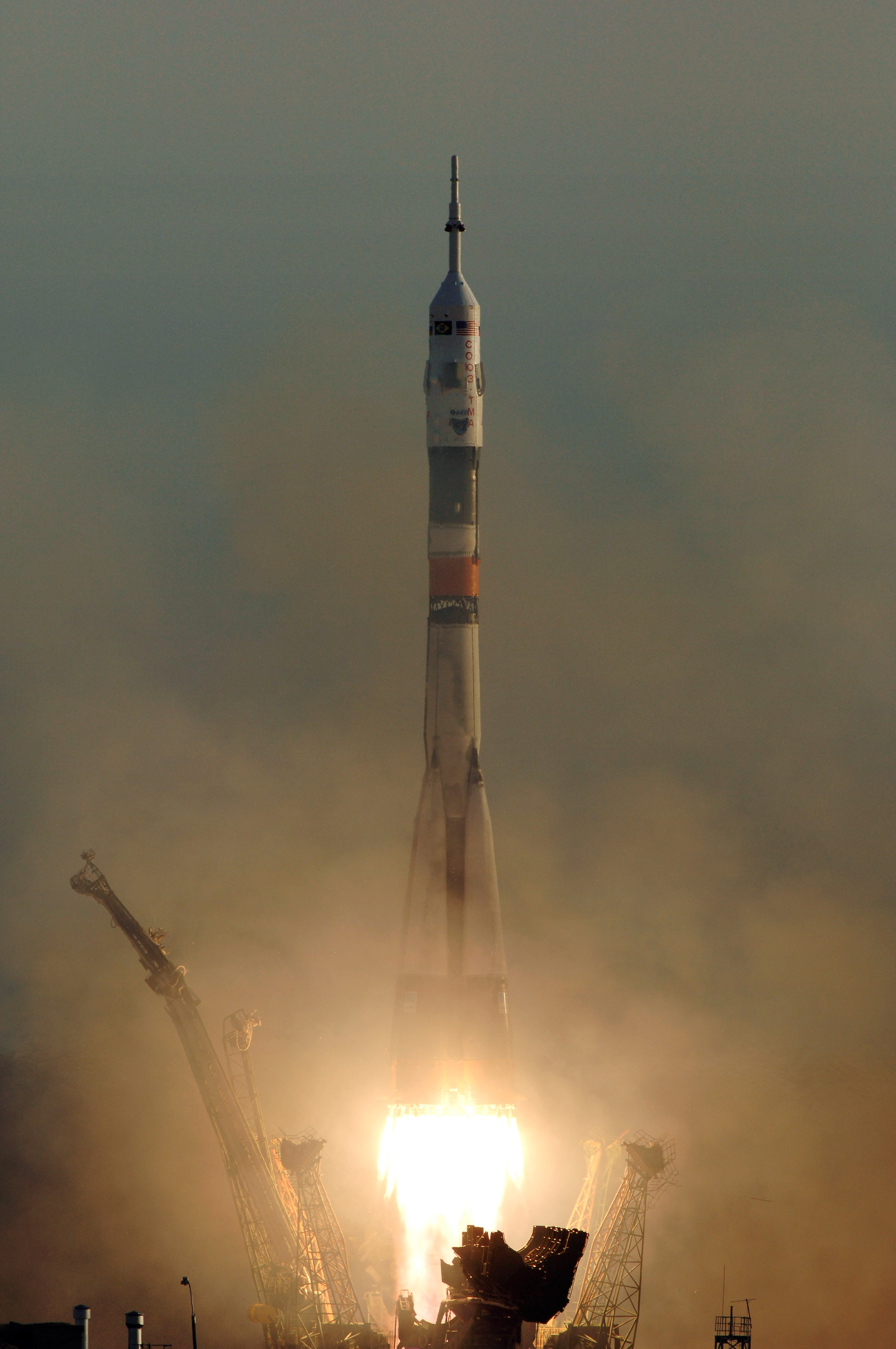
Launch of the Soyuz TMA-8 with Jeffrey Williams, Pavel Vinogradov and Marcos Pontes on March 30, 2006
