= Soyuz TMA-8 =

2006 Russian crewed spaceflight to the ISS

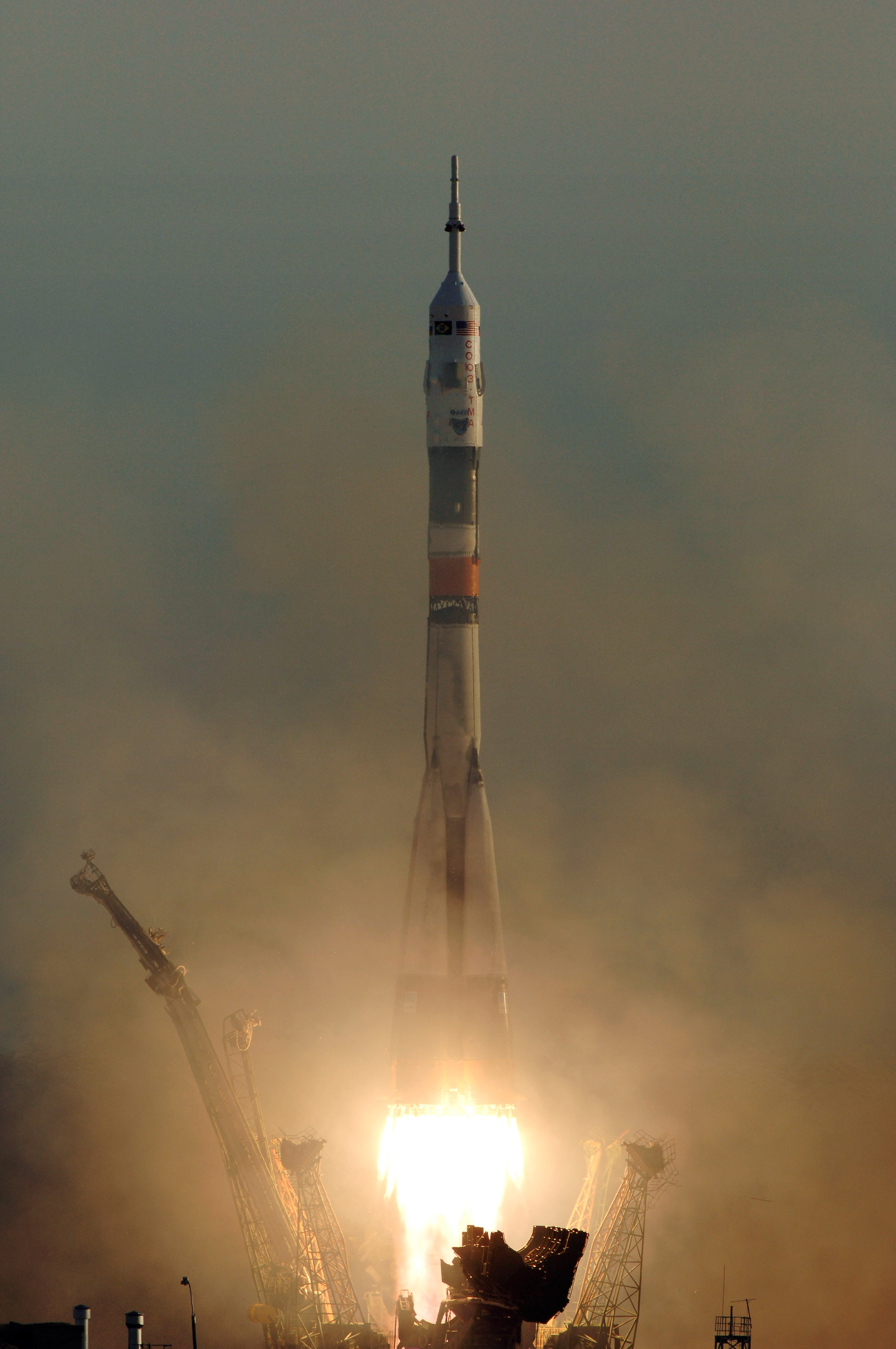
- Operator: Roscosmos
- COSPAR ID: 2006-009A
- SATCAT no.: 28996
- Mission duration: 182 days, 22 hours, 43 minutes

Spacecraft properties
- Spacecraft type: Soyuz-TMA 11F732
- Manufacturer: Energia
- Launch mass: 7,270 kilograms (16,030 lb)

Crew
- Crew size: 3
- Members: Pavel Vinogradov; Jeffrey Williams
- Launching: Marcos Pontes
- Landing: Anousheh Ansari
- Callsign: Carat

Start of mission
- Launch date: March 30, 2006, 02:30 UTC
- Rocket: Soyuz-FG
- Launch site: Baikonur 1/5

End of mission
- Landing date: September 29, 2006, 01:13 UTC
- Landing site: Kazakhstan

Orbital parameters
- Reference system: Geocentric
- Regime: Low Earth
- Perigee altitude: 200 kilometres (120 mi)
- Apogee altitude: 241 kilometres (150 mi)
- Inclination: 51.67 degrees
- Period: 88.64 minutes

Docking with ISS
- Docking port: Zarya nadir
- Docking date: 1 April 2006; 04:19 UTC
- Undocking date: 28 September 2006; 21:53 UTC
- Time docked: 180d 17h 34m
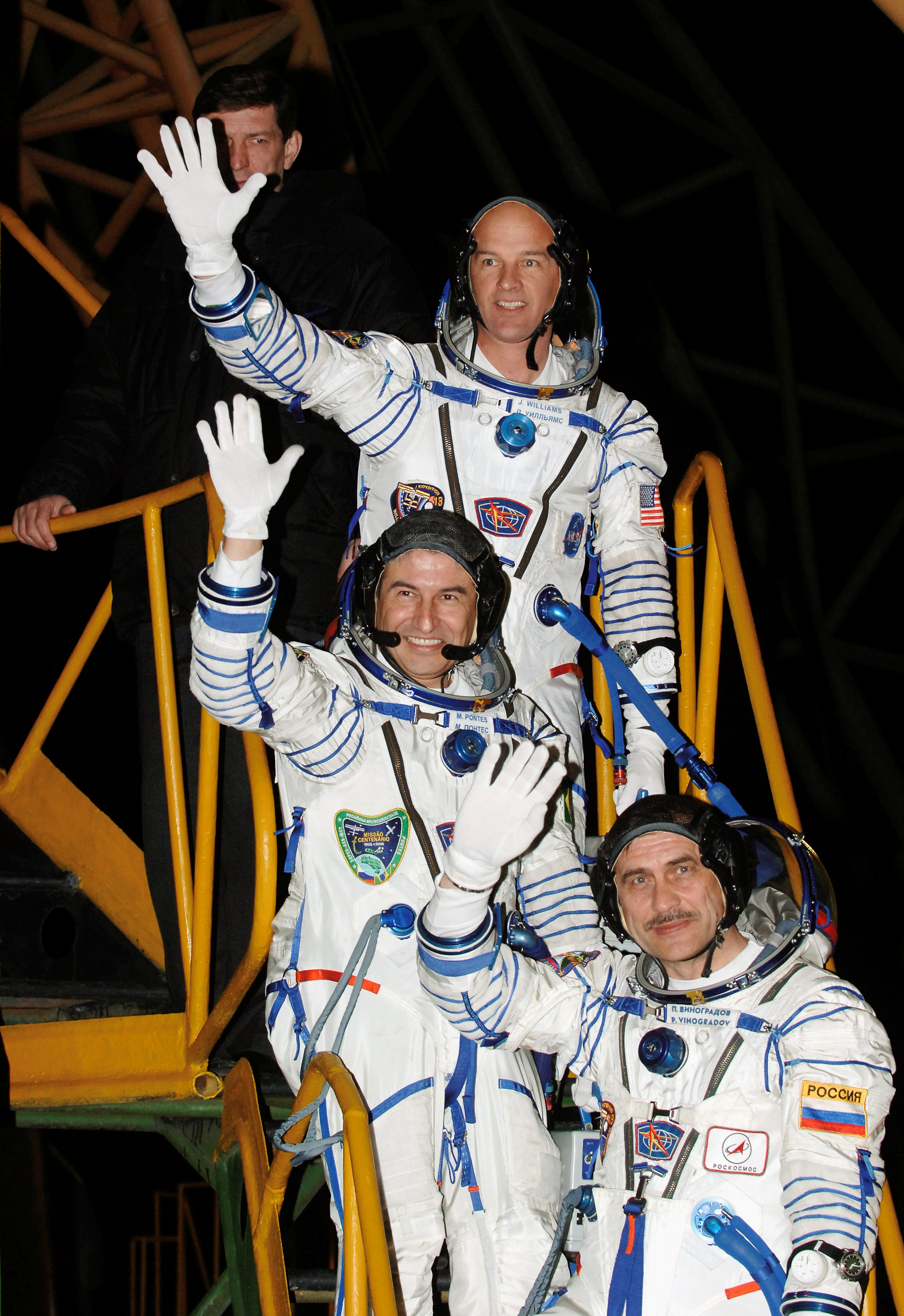
- From top to bottom: Jeffrey Williams, Marcos Pontes and Pavel Vinogradov. Soyuz programme (Crewed missions)

Soyuz TMA-8 was a Soyuz mission to the International Space Station (ISS) launched by a Soyuz FG launch vehicle.

== Crew ==
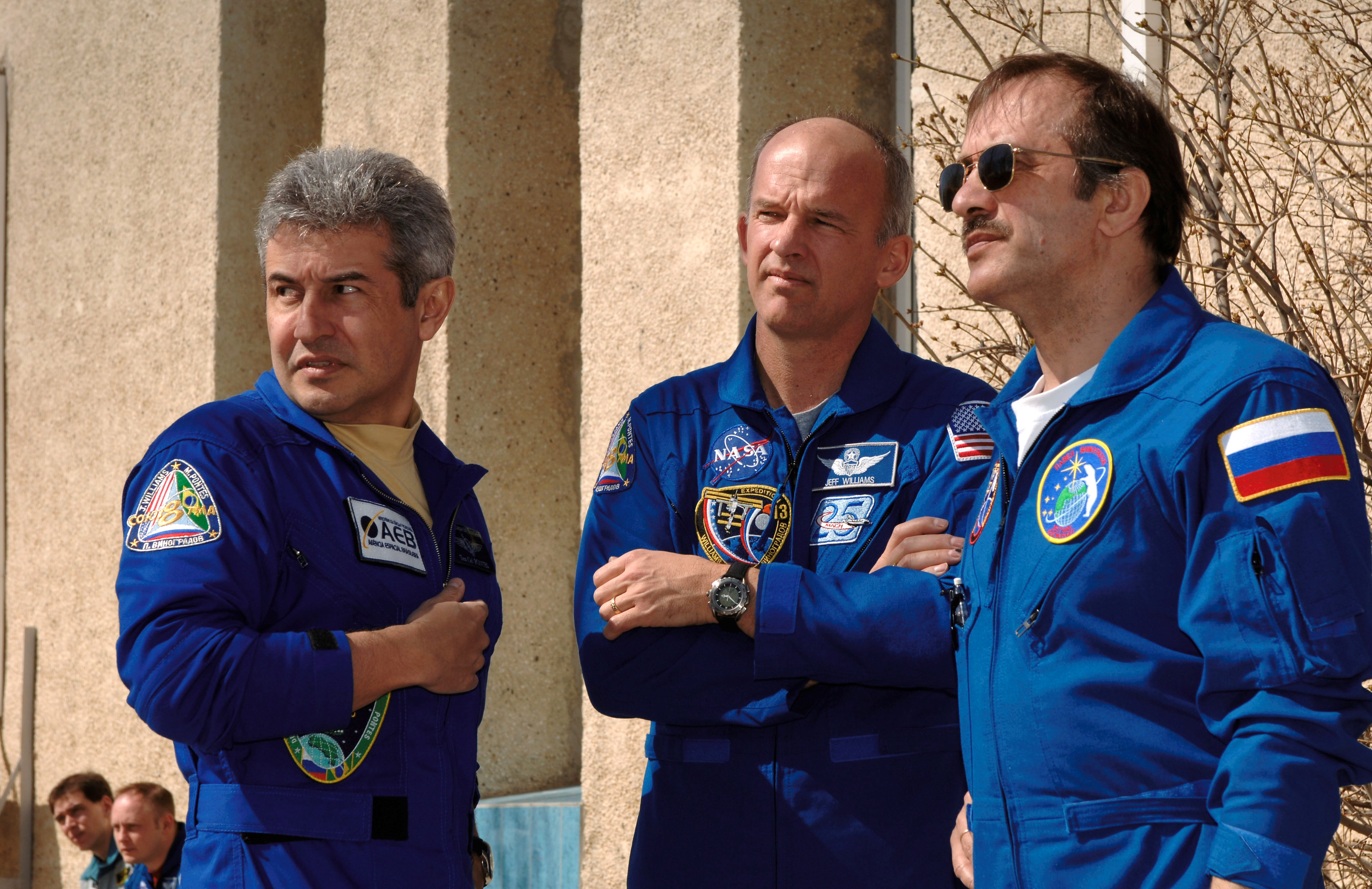
The crew at the Baikonur Cosmodrome

Soyuz TMA-8 was a transport mission for portions of the International Space Station (ISS) Expedition 13 crew. The flight delivered ISS Commander Pavel Vinogradov and ISS Flight Engineer Jeffrey Williams to the station to replace Expedition 12 crew members. Flight Engineer Marcos Pontes joined the TMA-8 crew for the ascent and docking with ISS, spent approximately seven days aboard the ISS conducting experiments as part of the Missão Centenário, then returned to Earth with the outgoing members of Expedition 12 aboard Soyuz TMA-7. Vinogradov and Williams were joined on their return trip to Earth by Spaceflight Participant Anousheh Ansari who launched aboard Soyuz TMA-9 and spent approximately eight days aboard ISS conducting experiments for the European Space Agency.

Position	Launching crew	Landing crew
Commander	(Russia) Pavel Vinogradov, Roscosmos; Expedition 13; Second spaceflight	
Flight Engineer	(United States) Jeffrey Williams, NASA; Expedition 13; Second spaceflight	
Spaceflight Participant	(Brazil) Marcos Pontes, AEB; Only spaceflight	(Iran) / (United States) Anousheh Ansari, SA; Only spaceflight Tourist

=== Back-up crew ===
Position	Crew
Commander	(Russia) Fyodor Yurchikhin, Roscosmos
Flight Engineer	(United States) Michael Fincke, NASA
Flight Engineer	(Russia) Sergei Volkov, Roscosmos

== Docking with ISS ==
- Docked to ISS: April 1, 2006, 04:19 UTC (to nadir port of Zarya)
- Undocked from ISS: September 28, 2006, 21:53 UTC (from nadir port of Zarya)

== Mission highlights ==
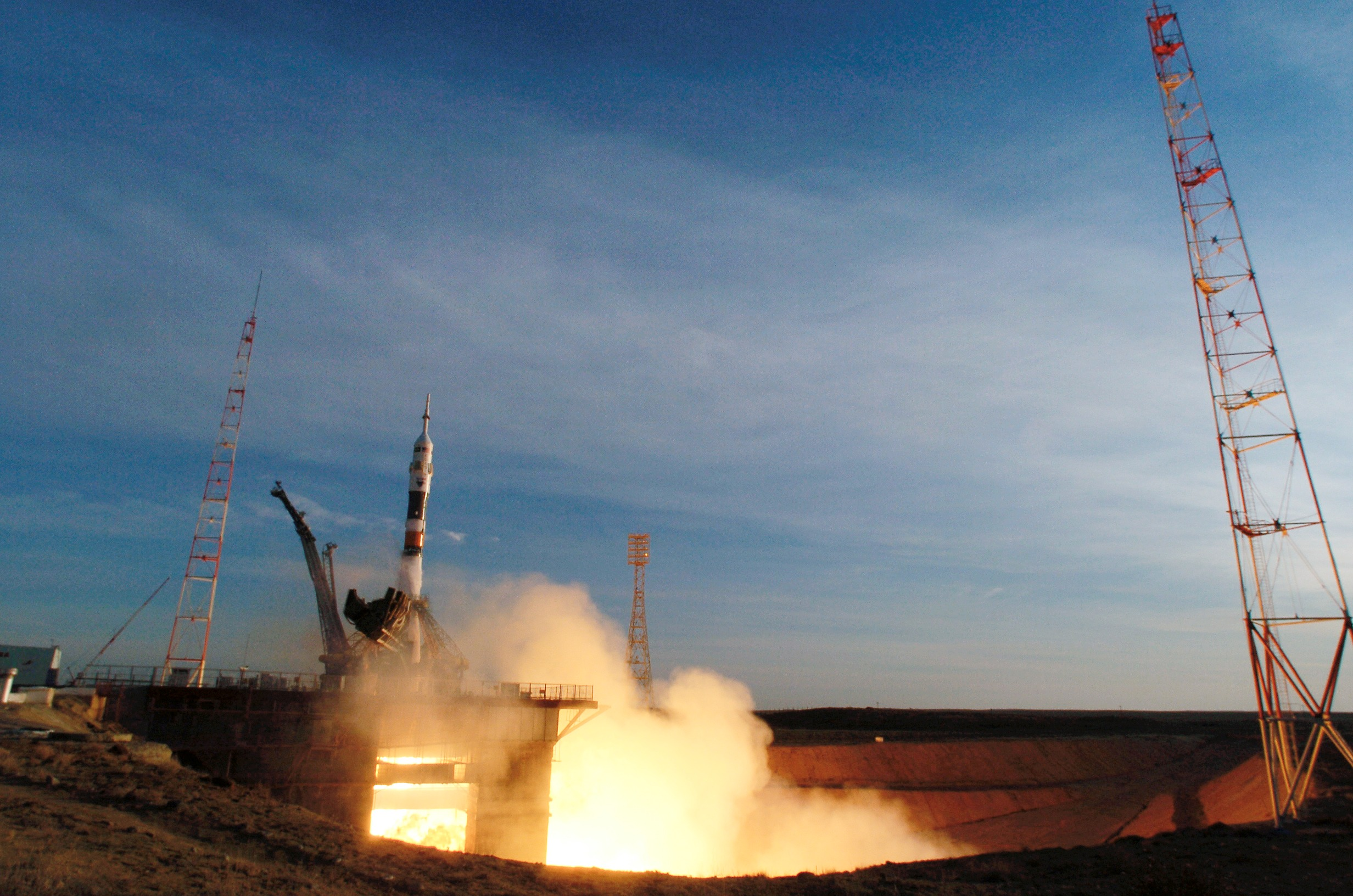
The Soyuz TMA-8 launch on 30 March 2006.

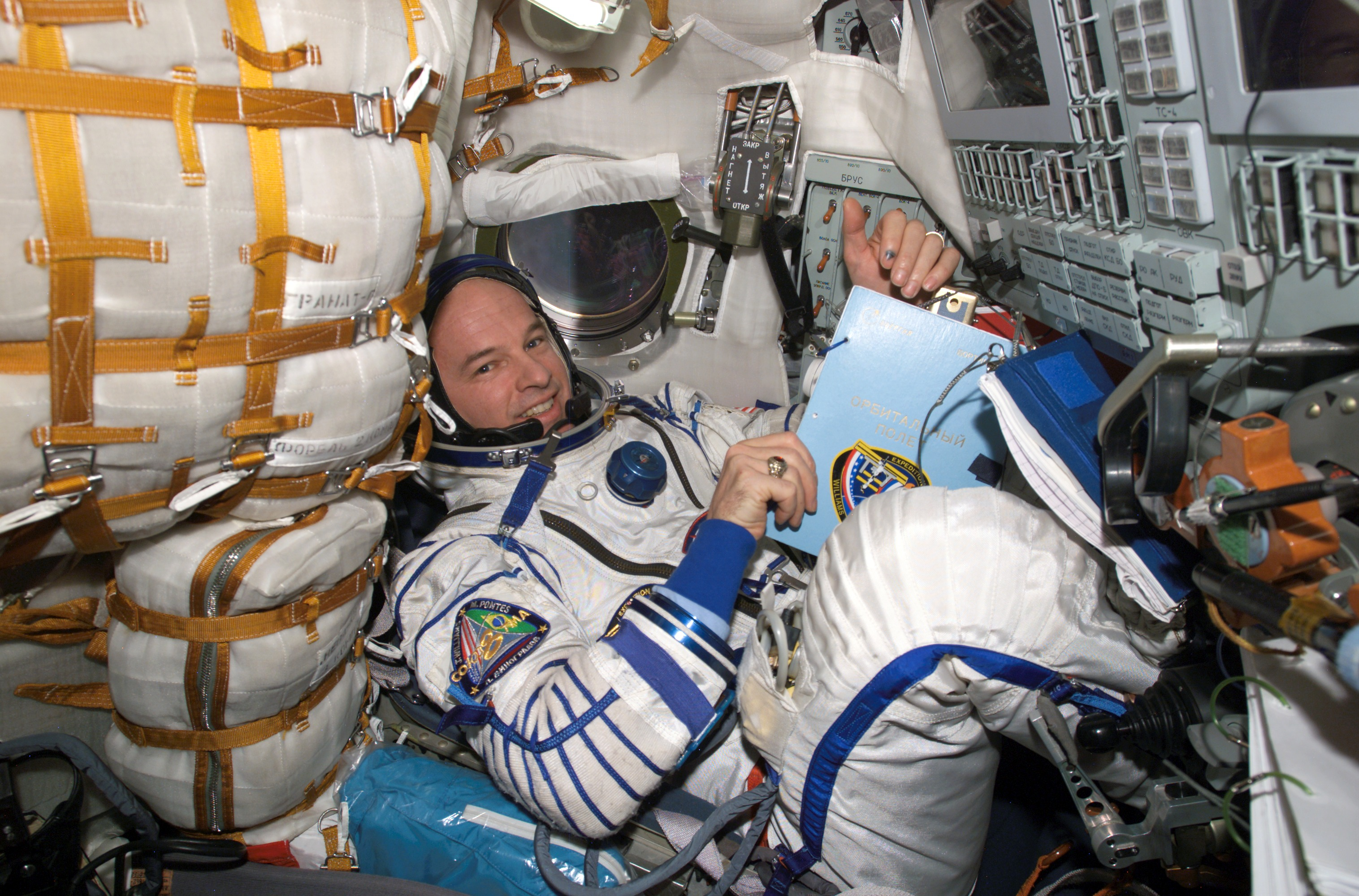
Jeffrey Williams inside the Soyuz TMA-8 spacecraft

29th crewed flight to ISS (Flight 12S)

Soyuz TMA-8 is a Soyuz spacecraft which was launched on March 30, 2006 by a Soyuz-FG rocket from the Baikonur Cosmodrome. Near the end of second stage burn, a communications blackout occurred at Moscow Mission Control. A satellite link was lost, but was restored about 10 minutes later. The crew was safe throughout the loss of communications.

The spacecraft carried two members of the Expedition 13 crew to the International Space Station, together with Marcos Pontes, the first Brazilian in space. The Brazilian government paid Russia approximately $20 million (USD) for Pontes' flight. They replaced the Expedition 12 crew, Commander William McArthur and Valery Ivanovich Tokarev. Together with the Expedition 12 crew, Marcos Pontes returned to Earth on board Soyuz TMA-7.

Soyuz TMA-8 returned to Earth, together with Expedition 13, the spaceflight participant launched with Soyuz TMA-9, Anousheh Ansari.

== See also ==
- List of spaceflights (2006)
