= Expedition 13 =

Expedition to the International Space Station

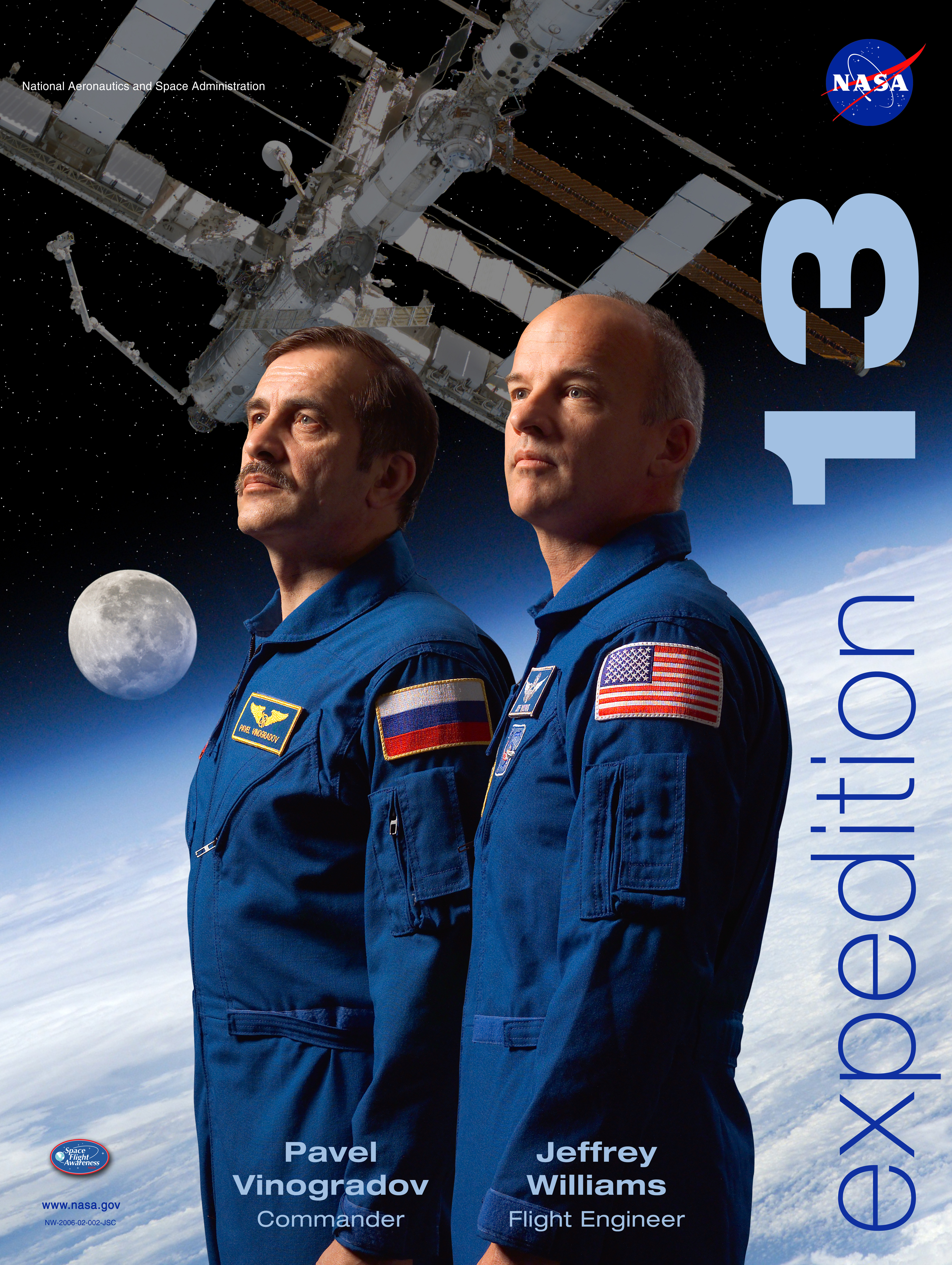
- Promotional poster
- Mission type: Long-duration expedition
- Mission duration: 180 days, 17 hours, 34 minutes (at ISS); 182 days, 23 hours, 44 minutes (launch to landing)
- Orbits completed: 2,886

Expedition
- Space station: International Space Station
- Began: 1 April 2006, 04:19 UTC
- Ended: 28 September 2006, 21:53 UTC
- Arrived aboard: Soyuz TMA-8; Reiter: STS-121; Space Shuttle Discovery
- Departed aboard: Soyuz TMA-8; Reiter: STS-116; Space Shuttle Discovery

Crew
- Crew size: 2; 3 (from July)
- Members: Pavel Vinogradov; Jeffrey Williams; Thomas Reiter* (from July) * – Transferred to Expedition 14
- EVAs: 2
- EVA duration: 12 hours, 25 minutes
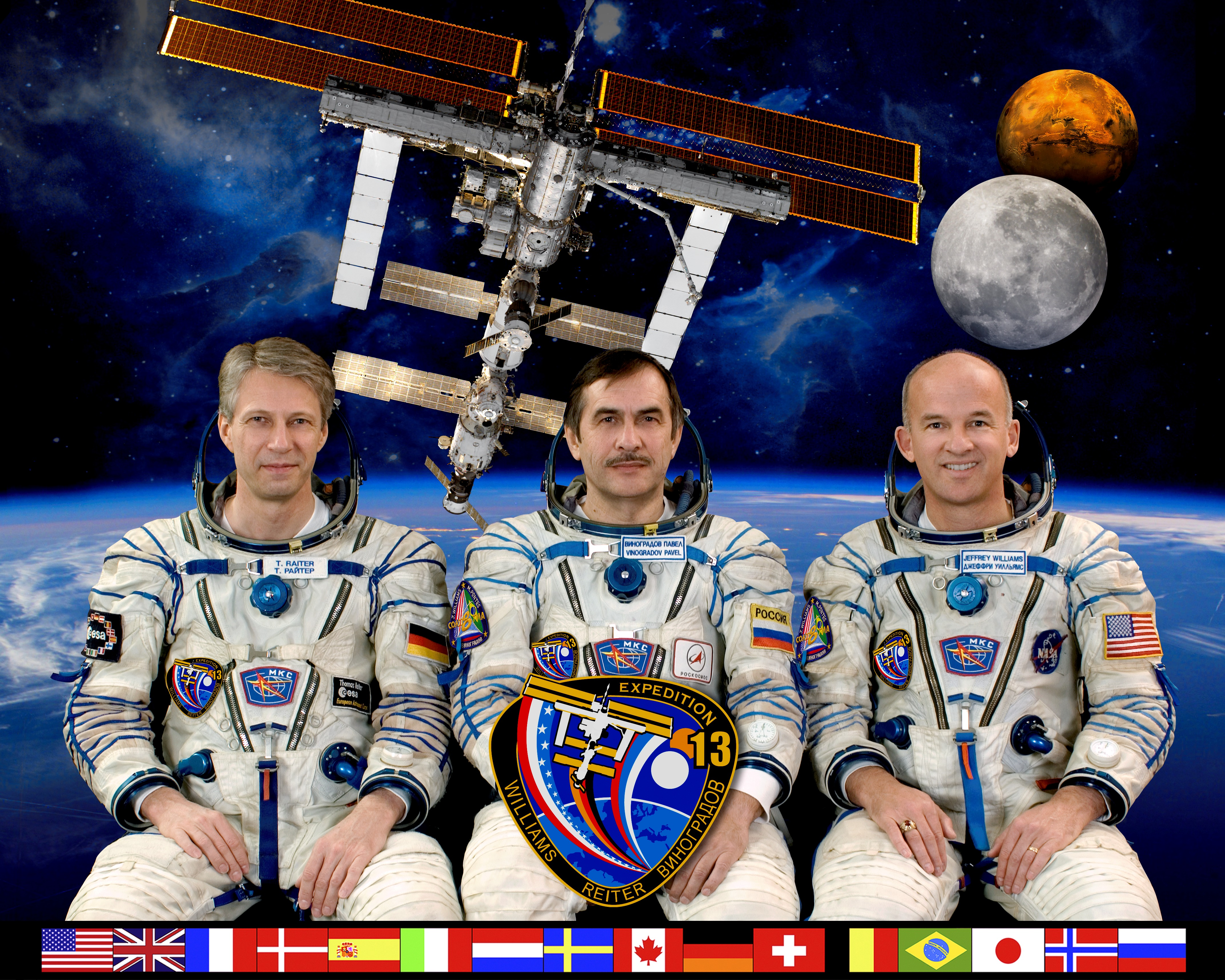
- Expedition 13 mission patch ISS expeditions

Expedition 13 was the 13th expedition to the International Space Station (ISS), and launched at 02:30 UTC on 30 March 2006. The expedition used the Soyuz TMA-8 spacecraft, which stayed at the station for the duration of the expedition for emergency evacuation.

Marcos Pontes launched with Expedition 13 on the Soyuz TMA-8 spacecraft and became the first Brazilian in space. He returned with Expedition 12 on Soyuz TMA-7 after a nine-day mission.

Thomas Reiter, from the European Space Agency, became part of the Expedition 13 crew in July 2006. Reiter was launched with the second "Return to Flight" mission on Discovery (STS-121) on 4 July 2006. Reiter became the first European long-duration crew member on the International Space Station when he officially joined the crew of the ISS at 19:13 UTC on 6 July 2006 upon the complete installation of his Soyuz spacecraft seat liner, allowing him to return to Earth aboard the docked Soyuz craft.

Reiter's arrival restored the station crew to three members for the first time since May 2003. The station's crew size had been reduced to two when shuttle flights were put on hold after the Space Shuttle Columbia accident on 1 February 2003.

== Crew ==
Original Expedition 13 Patch before the addition of Thomas Reiter

Position	First Part (March to July 2006)	Second Part (July to September 2006)
Commander	Pavel Vinogradov, RSA; Second spaceflight	
Flight Engineer 1	Jeffrey Williams, NASA; Second spaceflight	
Flight Engineer 2		Thomas Reiter, ESA; Second and last Spaceflight

Cosmonaut Dmitri Kondratyev was originally assigned to the flight but he was replaced by Reiter several months before launch.

== Back-up crew ==
- Fyodor Yurchikhin Commander and Soyuz Commander – RSA
- Michael Fincke Flight Engineer and NASA Science Officer – NASA
- Léopold Eyharts Flight Engineer – ESA (France)

== Spacewalks ==
=== EVA 1 ===
The first spacewalk for Expedition 13, performed by Pavel Vinogradov and Jeffrey Williams, began on 1 June, and ended on 2 June 2006.

It was originally scheduled to include a golf shot off the space station but the event was postponed to Expedition 14, as NASA was still evaluating the risks.

The spacewalk ran behind schedule, requiring an extra 50 minutes to be added to the length in order to complete the camera replacement. The EVA began 1 June, at 23:48 UTC and ended 2 June at 06:19 UTC, lasting 6 hours and 31 minutes. Other tasks during the walk included repair of a vent for the station's oxygen-producing Elektron unit, and retrieval of experiment packages.

=== EVA 2 ===
The second spacewalk for Expedition 13 occurred on 3 August 2006. The spacewalk was performed by Jeffrey Williams and Thomas Reiter, it began at 14:04 UTC and ended at 19:58 UTC, for a duration of 5 hours and 54 minutes.

During the spacewalk the astronauts installed the Floating Potential Measurement Unit (FPMU), installed two Materials on Materials International Space Station Experiment (MISSE) containers, installed a controller for a thermal radiator rotary joint, replaced a computer and installed a starboard jumper and spool positioning device (SPD), inspected a radiator beam valve module and installed another, installed a port jumper and SPD, tested an infrared camera, installed a light on the truss railway handcart, replaced a malfunctioning GPS antenna, installed a vacuum system valve, moved two articulated portable foot restraints, photographed a scratch on the airlock hatch, and retrieved a ball stack for inspection from PMA-1.
