= Soyuz TMA-7 =

2005 Russian crewed spaceflight to the ISS

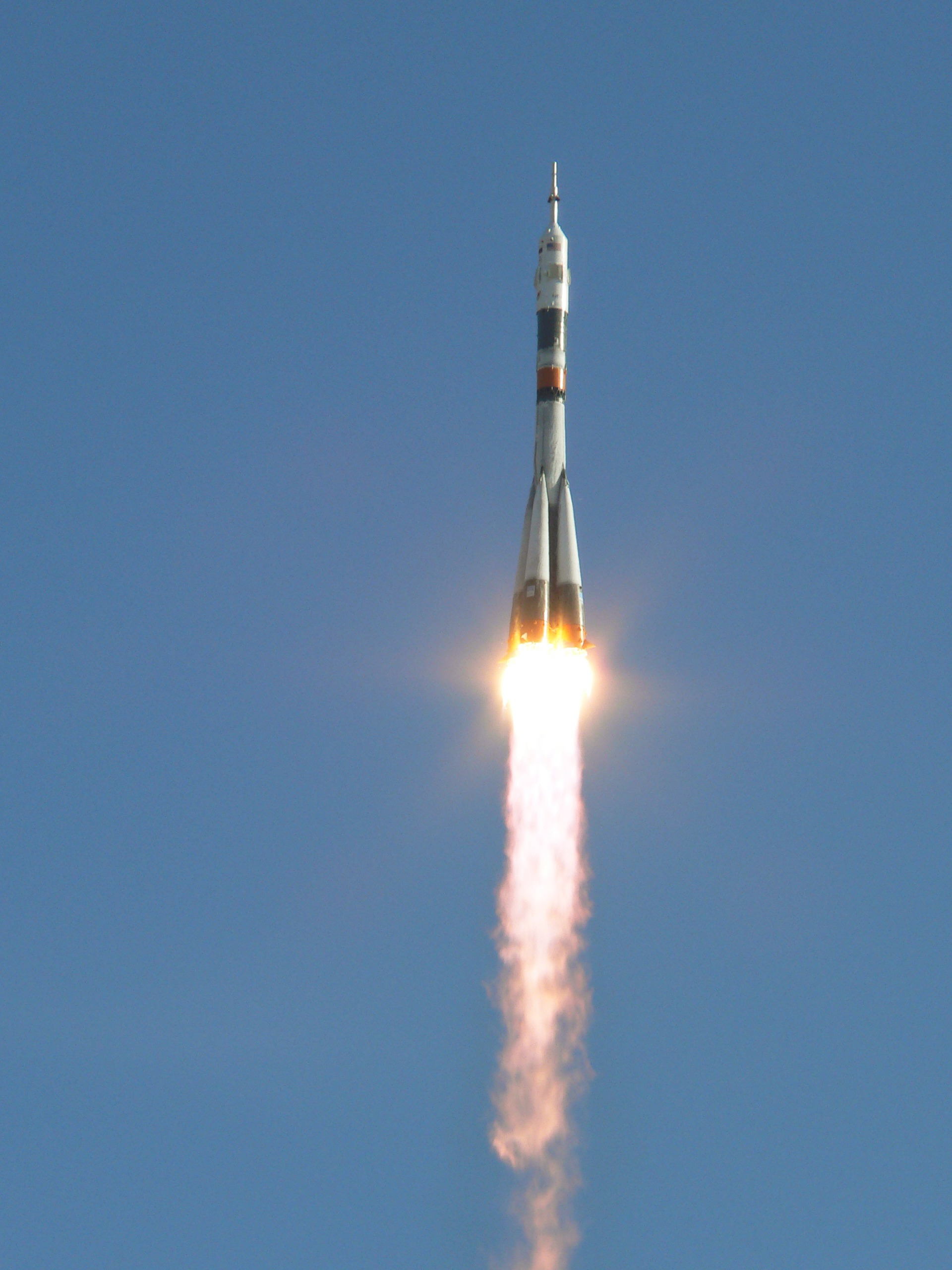
- Operator: Roscosmos
- COSPAR ID: 2005-039A
- SATCAT no.: 28877
- Mission duration: 189 days, 19 hours, 53 minutes
- Orbits completed: 2,987

Spacecraft properties
- Spacecraft type: Soyuz-TMA 11F732
- Manufacturer: Energia
- Launch mass: 7,200 kilograms (15,900 lb)

Crew
- Crew size: 3
- Members: Valery I. Tokarev; William S. McArthur, Jr.
- Launching: Gregory H. "Greg" Olsen
- Landing: Marcos C. Pontes

Start of mission
- Launch date: October 1, 2005, 03:55:00 UTC
- Rocket: Soyuz-FG
- Launch site: Baikonur 1/5

End of mission
- Landing date: April 8, 2006, 23:48:00 UTC

Orbital parameters
- Reference system: Geocentric
- Regime: Low Earth
- Perigee altitude: ~200 kilometres (120 mi)
- Apogee altitude: ~252 kilometres (157 mi)
- Inclination: ~51.7 degrees
- Period: ~88.7 minutes

Docking with ISS
- Docking port: Pirs nadir
- Docking date: 3 October 2005; 05:27 UTC
- Undocking date: 18 November 2005; 08:46 UTC
- Time docked: 46d 3h 19m

Docking with ISS (Relocation)
- Docking port: Zarya nadir
- Docking date: 18 November 2005; 09:05 UTC
- Undocking date: 20 March 2006; 06:49 UTC
- Time docked: 121d 21h 44m

Docking with ISS (Relocation)
- Docking port: Zvezda aft
- Docking date: 20 March 2006; 07:11 UTC
- Undocking date: 8 April 2006; 20:28 UTC
- Time docked: 19d 13h 17m
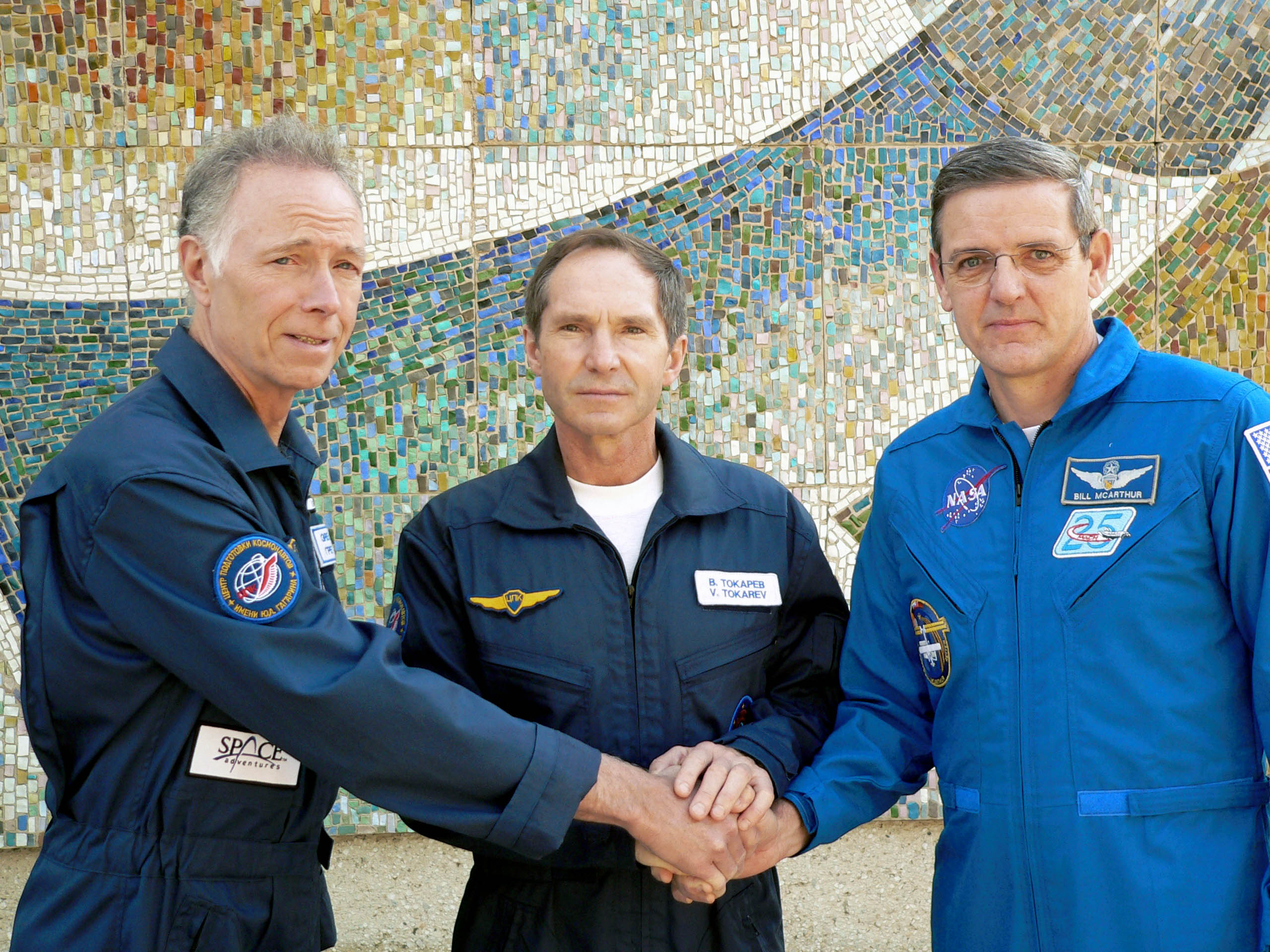
- Soyuz programme (Crewed missions)

Soyuz TMA-7 (Russian: Союз ТМА-7) was a transport mission for portions of the International Space Station (ISS) Expedition 12 crew launched October 1, 2005. The flight delivered ISS Commander William McArthur and ISS Flight Engineer Valery Tokarev to the station to replace Expedition 11 crew members. Spaceflight Participant Gregory Olsen joined the TMA-7 crew for the ascent and docking with the ISS, spent approximately eight days aboard conducting experiments, then returned to Earth with the outgoing members of Expedition 11 aboard Soyuz TMA-6. McArthur and Tokarev were joined on their return trip to Earth by Flight Engineer Marcos Pontes who launched aboard Soyuz TMA-8 and spent approximately seven days aboard the ISS conducting experiments for the Brazilian Space Agency.

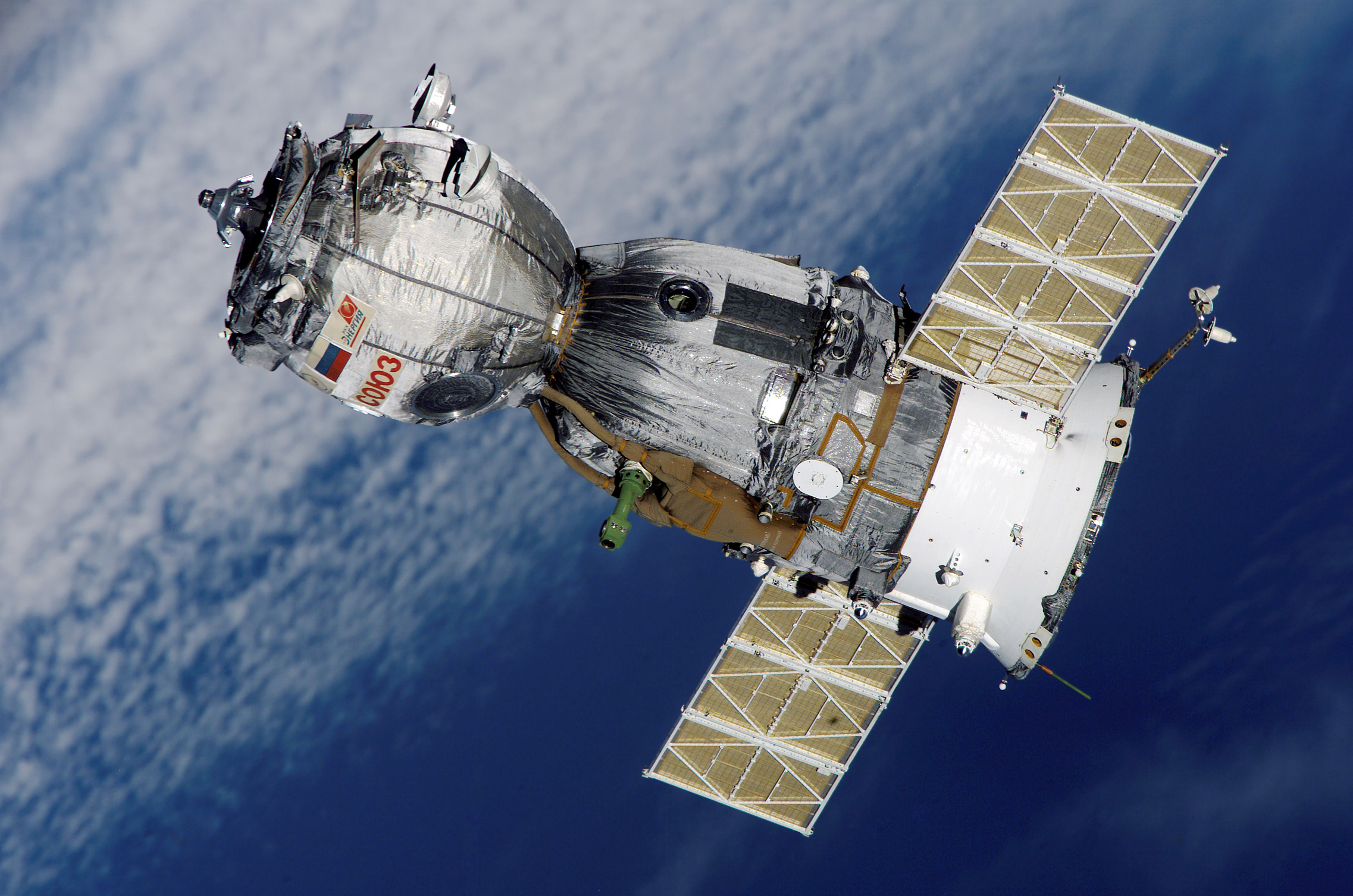
Soyuz TMA-7 seen from the ISS.

== Crew ==
Position	Launching crew	Landing crew
Commander	(Russia) Valery Tokarev, Roscosmos; Expedition 12; Second and last spaceflight	
Flight Engineer	(United States) William McArthur, NASA; Expedition 12; Fourth and last spaceflight	
Spaceflight Participant	(United States) Gregory Olsen, SA; Only spaceflight Space Tourist	(Brazil) Marcos Pontes, AEB; Only spaceflight

== Docking with ISS ==
- Docked to ISS: October 3, 2005, 05:27 UTC (to Pirs module)
- Undocked from ISS: November 18, 2005, 08:46 UTC (from Pirs module)
- Docked to ISS: November 18, 2005, 09:05 UTC (to nadir port of Zarya)
- Undocked from ISS: March 20, 2006, 06:49 UTC (from nadir port of Zarya)
- Docked to ISS: March 20, 2006, 07:11 UTC (to aft port of Zvezda)
- Undocked from ISS: April 8, 2006, 20:28 UTC (from aft port of Zvezda)

== Mission highlights ==
28th crewed flight to ISS (Flight 11S).

Soyuz TMA-7 is a Soyuz spacecraft which was launched on October 1, 2005 by a Soyuz-FG rocket from Baikonur Cosmodrome.

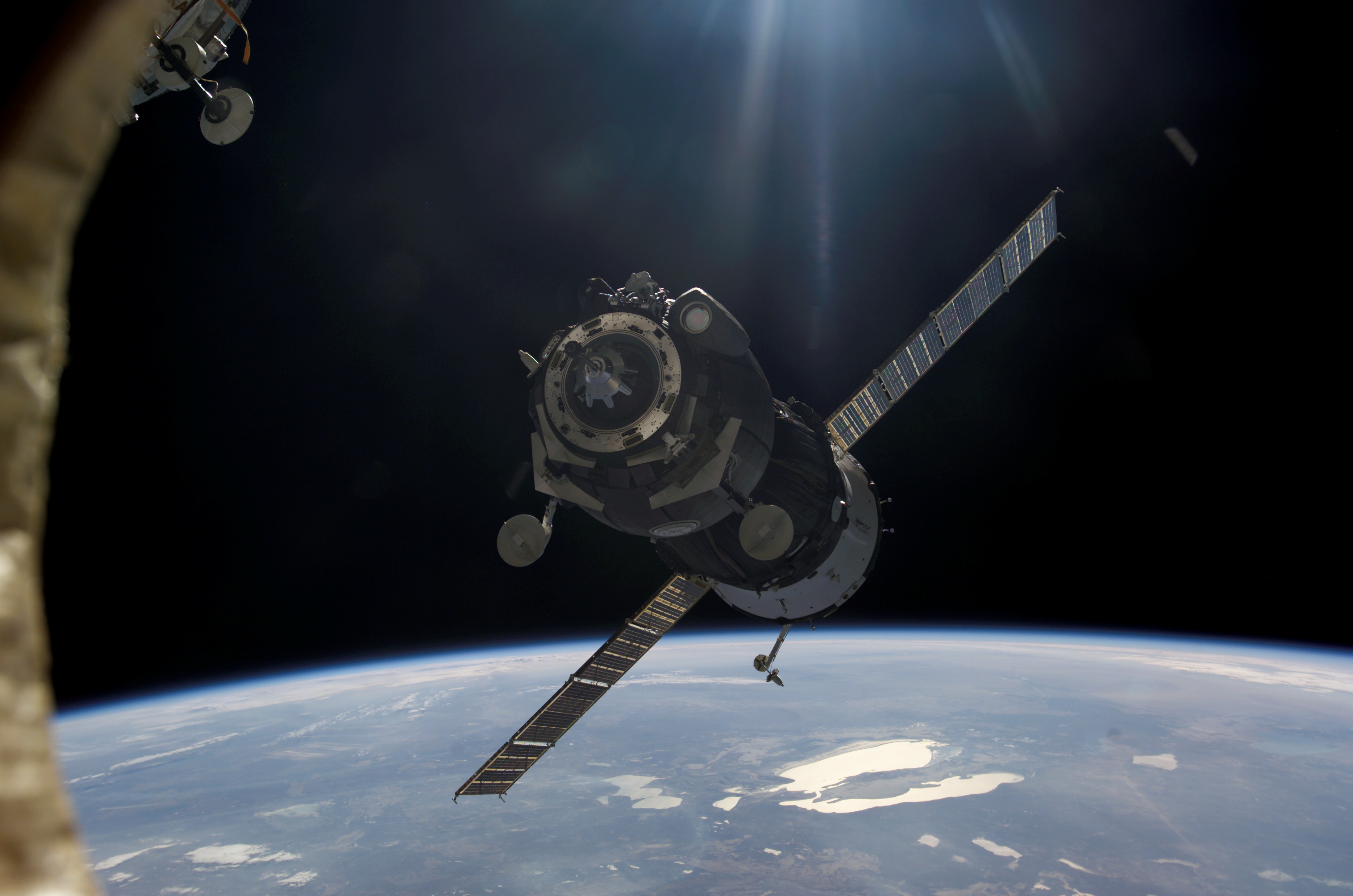
Soyuz TMA-7 approaches the International Space Station.

The spacecraft carried two members of the Expedition 12 crew to the International Space Station, together with the space tourist Gregory Olsen. They replaced the Expedition 11 crew, Commander Sergei Krikalev and John Phillips.

The last member of the original Expedition 12 crew, Thomas Reiter finally launched in July 2006 on STS-121. Owing to shuttle mechanical and weather delays, he was forced to move to Expedition 13.

This was the last flight which is covered by the 1996 "balance" agreement that required the Russians to provide 11 Soyuz spacecraft to ferry joint U.S-Russian crews to and from the International Space Station. Further Soyuz flights needed a renegotiation between NASA and its Russian counterpart, and a modification of the Iran Nonproliferation Act of 2000.

After re-entry, when the pilot parachute was deployed at a height of 10 km the main parachute took a while to open, which caused some concern among the crew and could have been fatal if the main parachute had taken longer to deploy.

== Replica ==
A company in Bauru is building a replica of the capsule that brought Marcos Pontes back to Earth, but they wrongly describe it as the Soyuz TMA-8.

== See also ==
- Pictures and narrative of launch.
