= Valeri Tokarev =

Russian cosmonaut (born 1952)

- Валерий Токарев
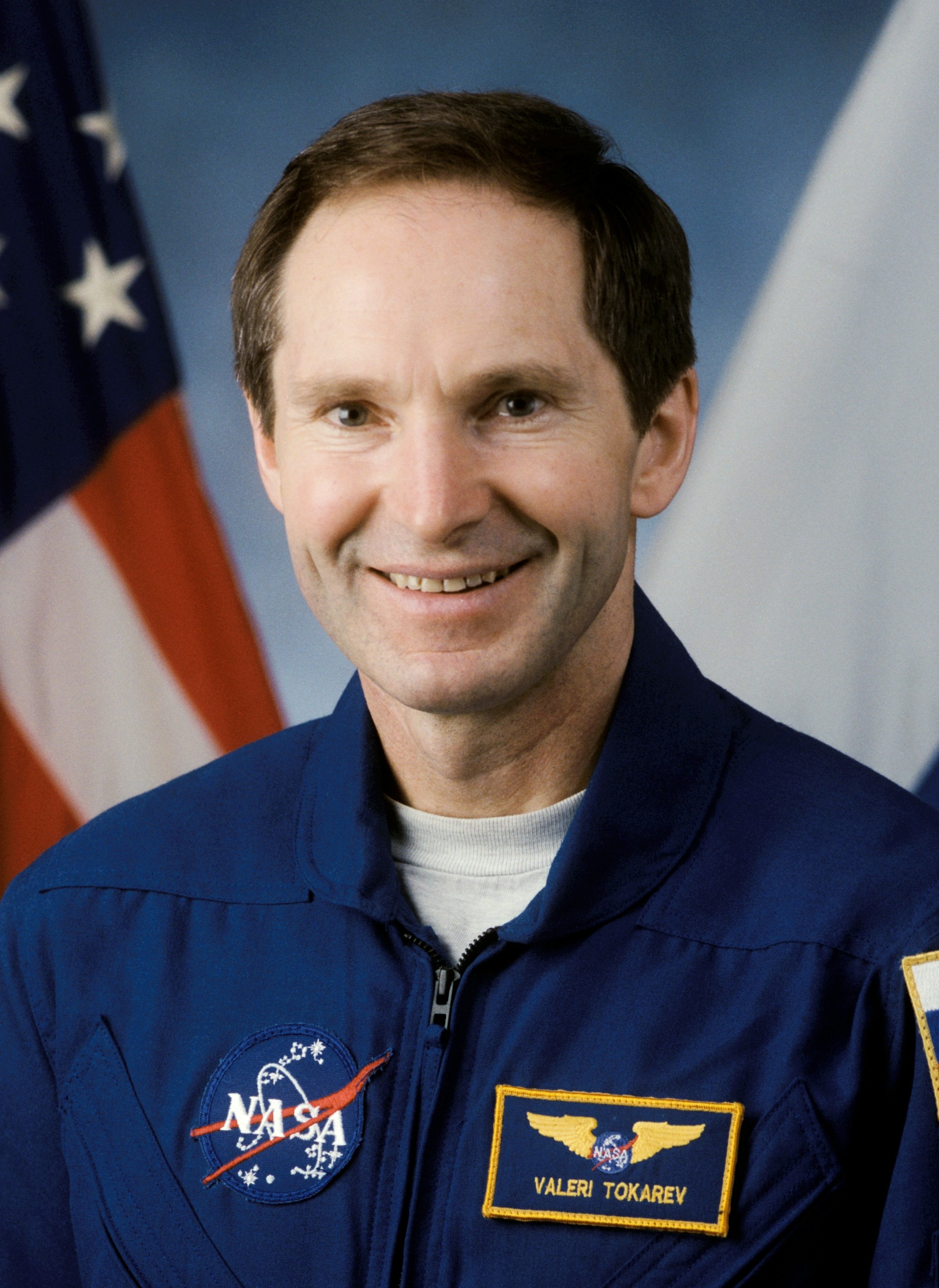
- Tokarev in a NASA uniform
- Born: 29 October 1952 (age 73); Kapustin Yar, Astrakhan Oblast, Soviet Union
- Occupation: Pilot
- Awards: Hero of the Russian Federation
- Space career

Roscosmos cosmonaut
- Status: Retired
- Rank: Air force colonel
- Time in space: 199d 15h 06m
- Selection: 1989 Cosmonaut Group
- Total EVAs: 2 (during Expedition 12)
- Total EVA time: 11h, 05m
- Missions: STS-96, Soyuz TMA-7 (Expedition 12)
- Mission insignia

Valeri Ivanovich Tokarev (Russian: Валерий Иванович Токарев; born 29 October 1952) is a Russian Air Force colonel and test cosmonaut at the Yuri A. Gagarin Cosmonaut Training Center. Tokarev traveled to space twice, and has performed two career spacewalks, before retiring in June 2008.

In 26 March 2009, Tokarev joined the United Russia party. On 8 September 2013, he was elected head of Zvyozdny Gorodok for five years, receiving 67.9% of the vote.

== Personal ==
Tokarev was born on 29 October 1952 in Kapustin Yar, Astrakhan Oblast, Soviet Union. He is married to Irina Tokareva (née Nikolayevna), with whom they have two children: a daughter, Olya, and a son, Ivan, and reside at Star City, Moscow Oblast. His mother, Lidiya, lives in the city of Rostov, Yaroslavl Region and his father, Ivan Pavlovich, died in an auto accident in 1972. Tokarev's interests include nature, automobiles, airplanes, and sports.

== Education ==
In 1973, Tokarev graduated from Stavropol Higher Military Aviation School for Pilots and Navigators. In 1982, he completed with honours his studies at the Test Pilot Training Center (TPTC) in Akhtubinsk. From 1989 to 1993 he studied by correspondence at the Yu. A. Gagarin Military Air Academy in Monino, and from 1996 to 1997 Tokarev studied at the National Economy Academy under the Russian Federal Government, full-time/correspondence tuition and received a master's degree in state administration.

== Experience ==
Tokarev is a 1st Class Air Force Pilot and a 1st Class Test Pilot. Tokarev has gained proficiency and flight experience with 44 types of airplanes and helicopters and has logged more than 3000 hours. He has participated in tests of fourth-generation carrier-based aircraft and vertical/short takeoff and landing jets (Su-27K, MiG-29K, Yak-38M, Su-25UTG), as well as bomber and missile navy fleet jets (Su-24M).

== Cosmonaut career ==
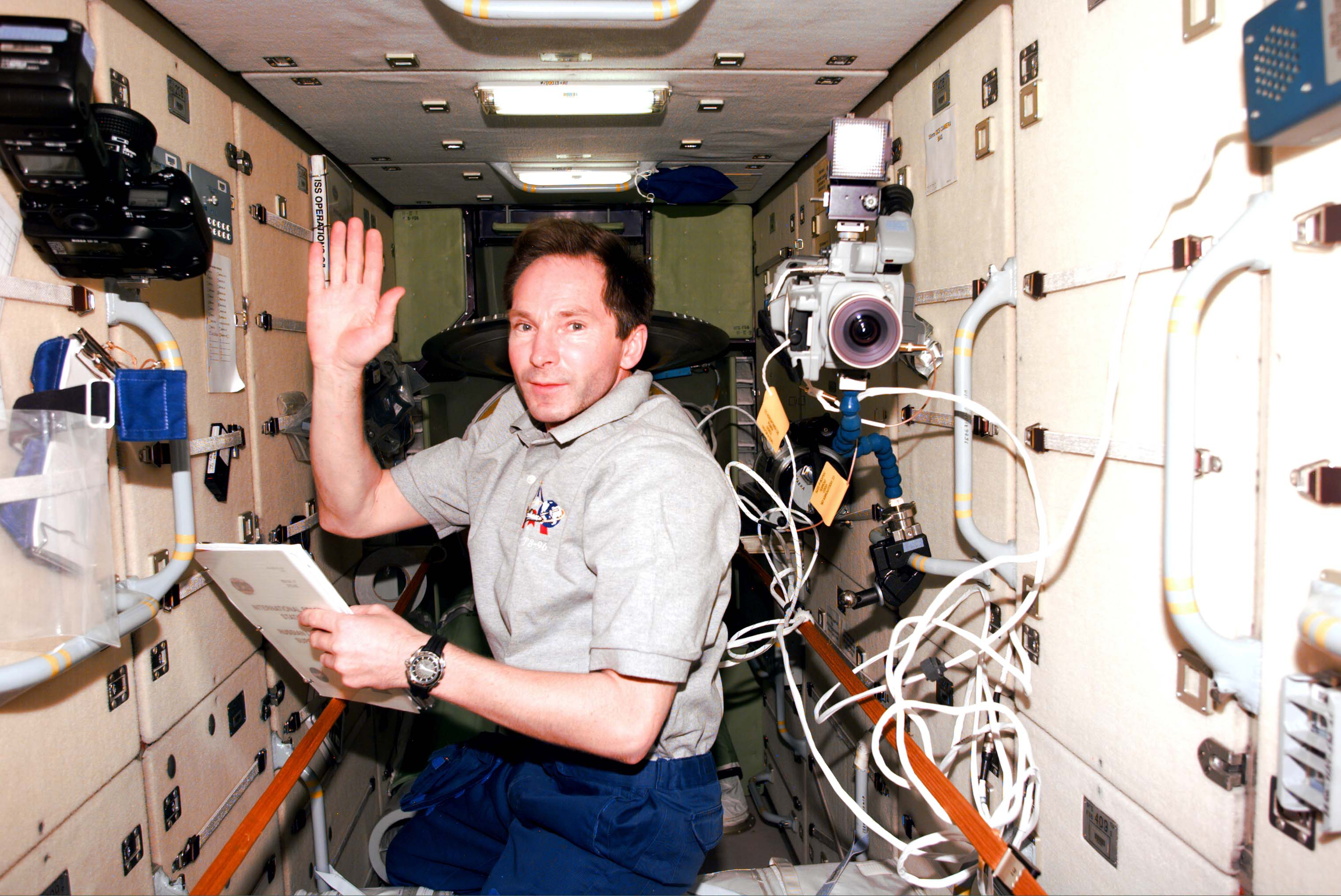
STS-96 Mission Specialist Valery Tokarev waves at a crewmate during work in the Zarya module on the ISS.

In 1987, Valeri Tokarev was selected to join the cosmonaut corps to test and fly the Buran spacecraft. Since 1994, he has served as commander of a group of cosmonauts of aerospace systems. Since termination of the Buran program in 1997, Tokarev has been assigned as a test cosmonaut at the Yuri A. Gagarin Cosmonaut Training Center.

=== STS-96 ===
Tokarev flew on STS-96, on 27 May 1999. STS-96 was a mission flown by Space Shuttle Discovery to the International Space Station (ISS). It was first shuttle flight to dock with the ISS. Tokarev served as a mission specialist. During the 10-day mission, the crew of Discovery delivered four tons of logistics and supplies to the ISS in preparation for the arrival of the first crew to live on the station. On flight day 2, Tokarev temporarily stowed some logistics transfer items stored on the shuttle's middeck, in the Spacehab module to provide more room for the spacesuit checkout activities. On 29 May Tokarev and NASA astronaut Ellen Ochoa temporarily stowed docking targets and lights and checked hatch seals in the narrow passageway inside the Pressurized Mating Adapter (PMA 2). The next day, he and Canadian astronaut Julie Payette traveled to the Zarya module and began maintenance activities on the storage batteries located under the floorboard. He and Payette replaced battery recharge controllers. To reduce noise levels in the Zarya module, Tokarev also installed acoustic insulation around some fans. He was also involved with the transfer of logistics items by documenting and stowing items aboard the ISS. On 1 June Tokarev took time out to answer questions regarding the progress of the mission from Russian reporters.

At the end of the mission on 6 June, Discovery landed at the Kennedy Space Center runway 15 at 2:02:43 a.m. EDT. The mission was accomplished in 153 Earth orbits, traveling 4 million miles in 235 hours and 13 minutes.

=== Expedition 12 ===
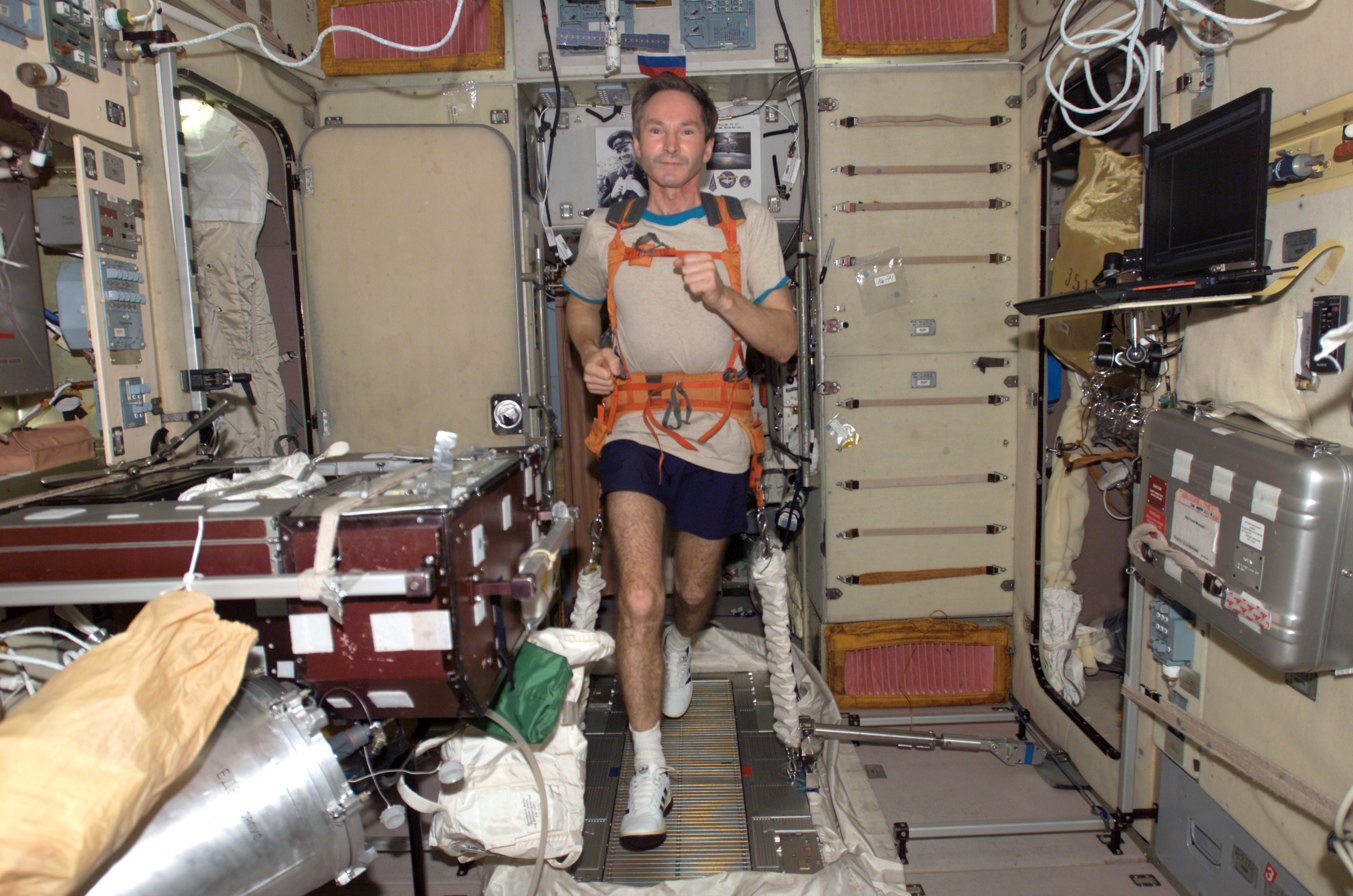
Valery Tokarev exercises on the Treadmill Vibration Isolation System (TVIS) in the Zvezda Service Module of the ISS.

Tokarev was the flight engineer for the Expedition 12 crew on the ISS, arriving at the station aboard the Soyuz TMA-7 spacecraft on 3 October 2005. The Soyuz TMA-7 carrying Tokarev, NASA astronaut William McArthur and U.S spaceflight participant Gregory Olsen lifted off from the Baikonour cosmodrome at 03:55 UTC on 1 October. After two days of autonomous flight Soyuz TMA-7 docked with the Pirs Docking Compartment Module on the ISS at 05:27 UTC.

Torakev performed the Russian part of science experiments that included more than 30 experiments on board. He was involved with biological, microbiological, genetic and physics experiments. One of the experiments named Plants allowed to obtain peas grown on the station and also grow greens. Medical experiments he performed aimed at finding the effects of extreme space conditions on humans and blood cells. His physics research included investigating the upper layers of the atmosphere. The objective of the research was to improve the understanding of how the space vehicles affect the upper levels of the atmosphere. During Expedition 12, one cargo flight, Progress M-55 docked with the ISS on 23 December 2005. The resupply ship transported scientific equipment and supplies to the station.

Torakev departed the ISS on 6 April 2006. Tokarev, McArthur and Brazilian spaceflight participant Marcos Pontes returned to Earth inside the Soyuz TMA-7 capsule on 8 April 2006 at 23:48 UTC. The spacecraft landed at the assigned site near the town of Arkalyk in Kazakhstan. Torakev spent 189 days, 19 hours and 53 minutes in space on board the Soyuz spacecraft and the ISS.

=== Spacewalks ===
Tokarev has performed two spacewalks during the course of his cosmonaut career totaling 11 hours and 5 minutes.

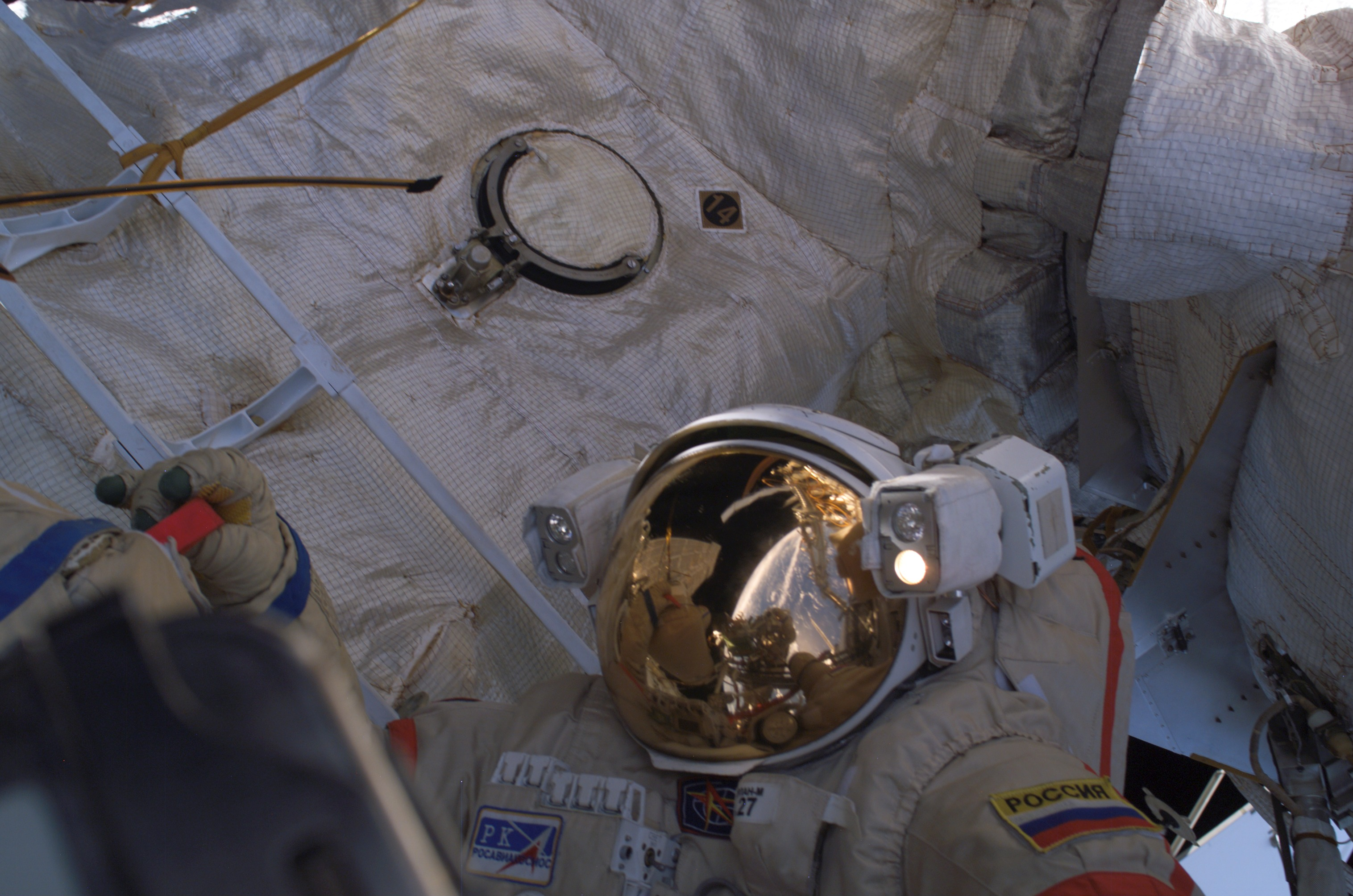
Valery Tokarev participates in the second spacewalk of Expedition 12.

On 7 November 2005 Torakev performed his first career spacewalk. The beginning of the spacewalk was delayed about an hour to repressurize the Quest airlock's crew compartment. During the 5 hours, 22 minutes spacewalk, He and NASA astronaut William McArthur installed a new camera assembly and jettisoned the Floating Potential Probe. They also completed two get-ahead tasks. Tokarev wore an all-white suit for the spacewalk. Their first primary task was the camera assembly installation on the Port 1 Truss. The two spacewalkers spent about 2 hours, 10 minutes on the installation. In order to have daylight for the Floating Potential Probe (FPP) jettison, they moved on to the retrieval of a failed remote joint motor controller. Once it was completed, the pair with MacArthur in the lead then moved up the P6 truss to the FPP. The dysfunctional FPP had been designed to measure the space station's electrical potential and compare it to the surrounding plasma. Tokarev and McArthur released and stowed a grounding wire, then released the FPP housing from its stanchion. They checked its condition and McArthur carefully jettisoned the FPP. The FFP removal and jettisoning took an hour to complete. The two spacewalkers next removed and replaced a remote power controller module on the mobile transporter. After completing all the tasks the pair returned to the Quest airlock at 3:54 EST.

On 3 February 2006 Torakev performed his second career spacewalk. He and McArthur donned in red-striped Orlan suits, ventured outside the ISS at 5:44 p.m. EST from the Pirs docking compartment airlock to begin the spacewalk. During the spacewalk, Tokarev and McArthur relocated a boom adapter for the Strela, a Russian hand-operated crane, from the Zarya module to Pressurized Mating Adapter 3. They also retrieved experiments and inspected and photographed parts of the station's exterior. The two spacewalkers also jettisoned an old Russian Orlan spacesuit equipped with a radio for broadcasts to students around the world. The suit, dubbed SuitSat-1 had reached the end of its operational life for spacewalks in August 2004. It was outfitted by the crew with three batteries, internal sensors and a radio transmitter for this experiment. The SuitSat-1 had recorded greetings in six languages to ham radio operators for about two orbits of the Earth before it stopped transmitting The suit was expected to enter the atmosphere and burn up in a few weeks after the spacewalk. The spacewalk ended when the two re-entered the Pirs airlock and closed its hatch at 11:27 p.m. EST. The spacewalk lasted 5 hours and 43 minutes.

== Awards ==
Tokarev was awarded the "Hero of the Russian Federation" medal in 2000, Pilot Cosmonaut of the Russian Federation title in 1999, the Gold Star Medal of the Hero of the Russian Federation, Order for Service to Motherland in the USSR Air Forces Third Class in 1978, RF Medals and the NASA Space Flight Medal in 1999. He is an Honorary Citizen of Rostov, Yaroslavl Oblast.

== See also ==
- List of Heroes of the Russian Federation
