= Expedition 12 =

12th expedition to the International Space Station

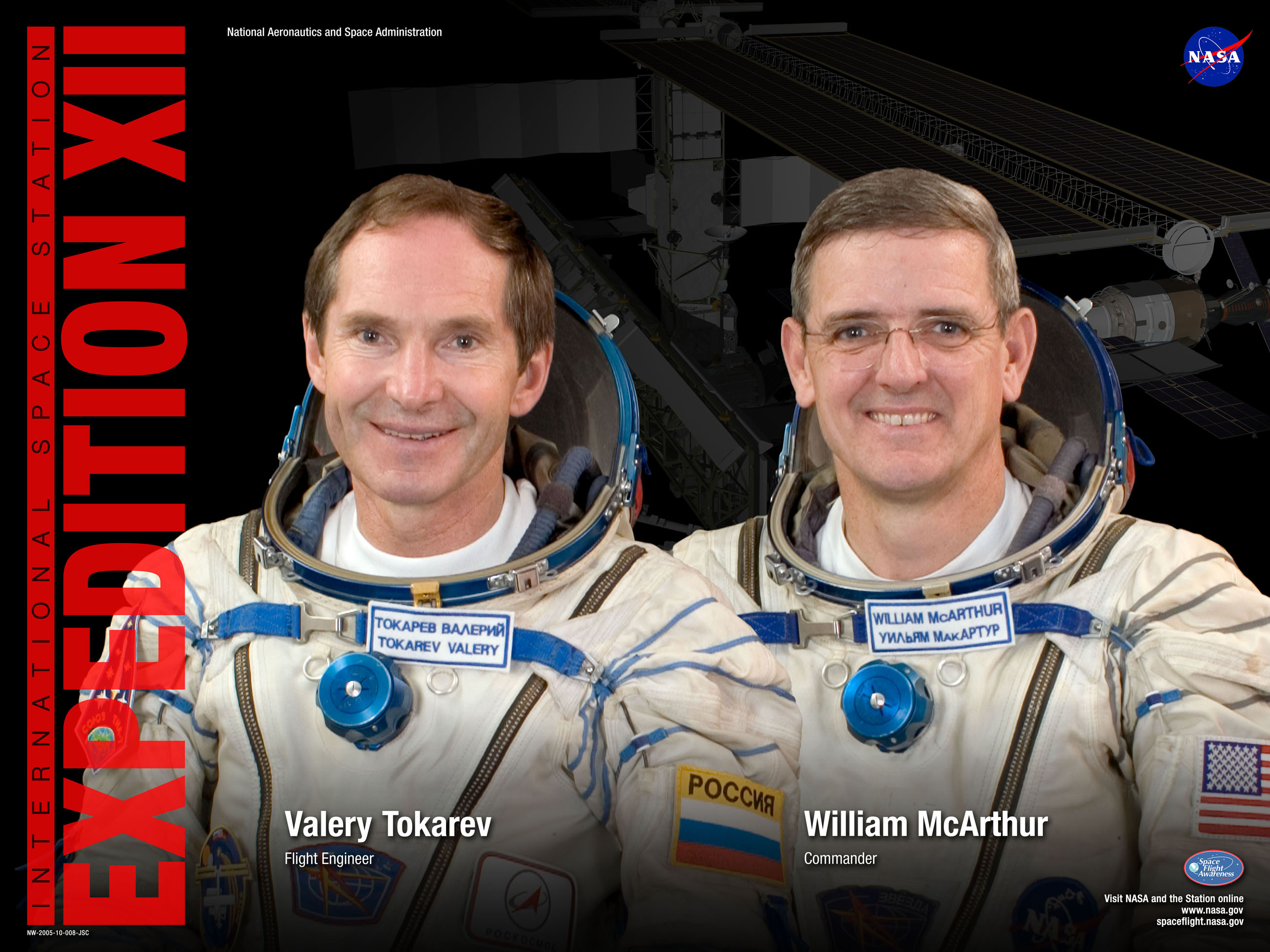
- Promotional poster
- Mission type: Long-duration expedition
- Mission duration: 187 days, 14 hours, 1 minute (at ISS); 189 days, 19 hours, 53 minutes (launch to landing)
- Orbits completed: 2,987

Expedition
- Space station: International Space Station
- Began: 3 October 2005, 05:27 UTC
- Ended: 8 April 2006, 19:28 UTC
- Arrived aboard: Soyuz TMA-7
- Departed aboard: Soyuz TMA-7

Crew
- Crew size: 2
- Members: William S. McArthur; Valeri I. Tokarev
- EVAs: 2
- EVA duration: 11 hours, 5 minutes
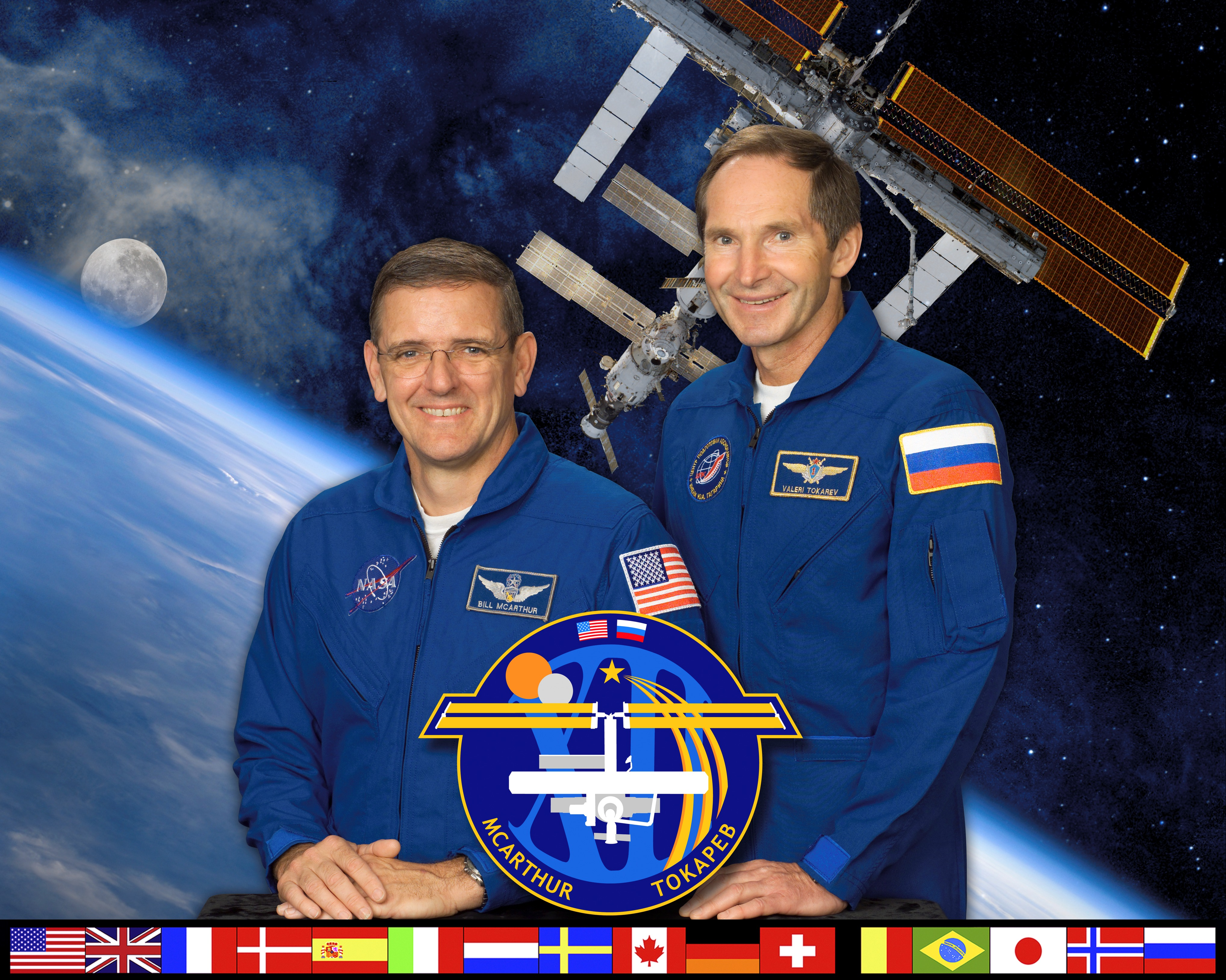
- Expedition 12 mission patch William S. McArthur, Jr. (United States left), Valeri I. Tokarev (Russia right) ISS expeditions

Expedition 12 (2005) was the 12th expedition to the International Space Station, launched from Kazakhstan using the Russian Soyuz TMA-7 spacecraft. The crew landed back in Kazakhstan on 8 April 2006 with the addition of the first Brazilian astronaut, Marcos Pontes.

American entrepreneur Gregory Olsen was launched in the Soyuz TMA-7 spacecraft and returned with Expedition 11 on Soyuz TMA-6 on 11 October 2005 thereby becoming the third space tourist.

== Crew ==
Prime crew
| Position | Astronaut |
|---|---|
| Commander | William S. McArthur, NASA; Fourth and last spaceflight |
| Flight Engineer 1 | Valeri I. Tokarev, RSA; Second and last spaceflight |

== Mission parameters ==
- Perigee:
- Apogee:
- Inclination: 51.6 degrees
- Orbital period:

== Mission objectives ==
Station assembly preparations, maintenance and science in microgravity.

== Spacewalks ==
There were two spacewalks outside the ISS during Expedition 12. McArthur and Tokarev participated in both of them.

=== EVA 1 ===
The first EVA was on 7 November 2005 for 5 hours and 22 minutes. There were two main objectives, both of which were completed. The first was to install and set up a new camera on the P1 Truss which was later used in the installation of more truss segments. The second was to jettison the Floating Potential Probe which was a failed instrument, designed to measure the station's electrical potential and compare it to the surrounding plasma.

=== EVA 2 ===
The second spacewalk took place on 3 February 2006 and lasted 5 hours and 43 minutes. The astronauts jettisoned an old Russian Orlan spacesuit, named SuitSat-1, that was equipped with a radio for broadcasts to students around the world. The suit reached the end of its operation life in 2004. They also retrieved the Biorisk experiment, photographed a sensor for a micrometeoroid experiment, and tied off the surviving umbilical of the mobile transporter.

== Solar eclipse ==
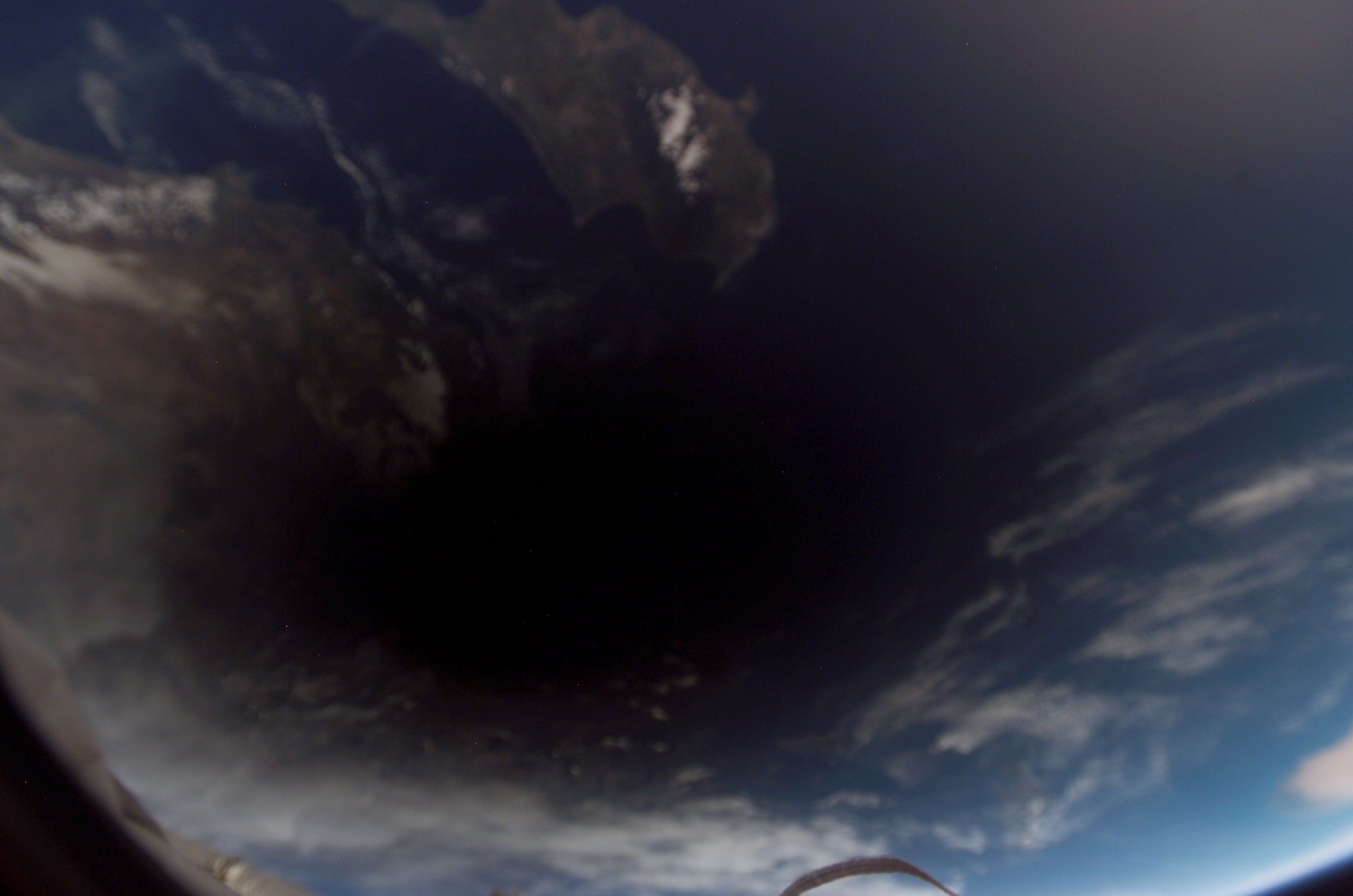
Solar eclipse from space 29 Mar 2006

On 29 March 2006 a total solar eclipse took place, and the adjacent picture was taken by the Expedition 12 crew. It clearly shows the shadow of the Moon being cast on the Earth.

== Concert ==
While wake-up music is a tradition aboard space shuttle missions, the ISS crew generally use an alarm clock to wake up. Expedition 12 astronauts received a special treat on 3 November 2005 when Paul McCartney performed Good Day Sunshine and English Tea in a first ever concert linkup from the Arrowhead Pond in Anaheim, California on his US tour. The event was broadcast live on NASA TV.
