= Soyuz TMA =

Revision of the Soyuz spacecraft

Soyuz-TMA
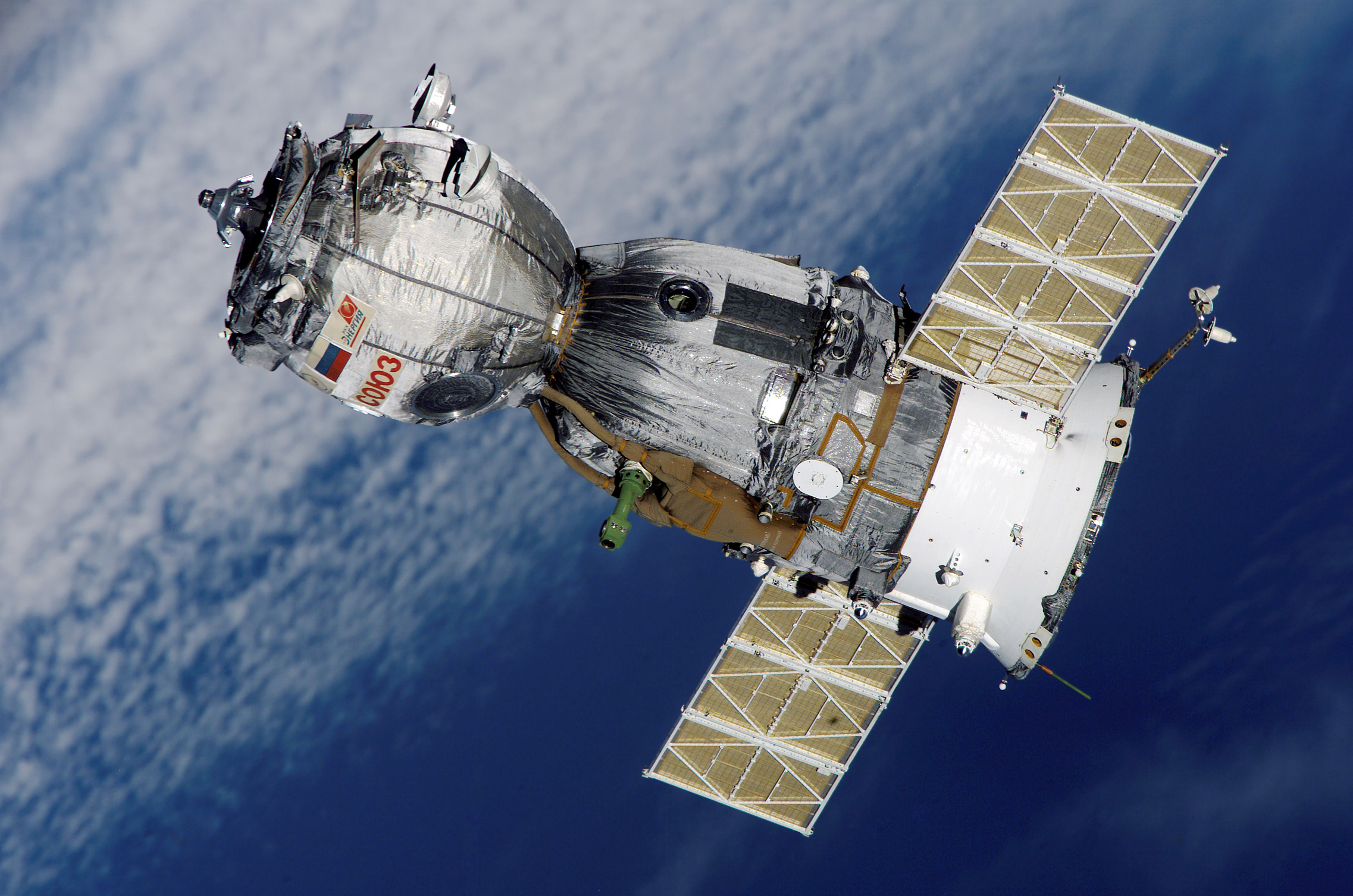
- Manufacturer: Energia
- Country of origin: Russia
- Operator: Roscosmos
- Applications: ISS crew transport

Specifications
- Regime: Low Earth orbit
- Design life: Up to six months docked to ISS

Production
- Status: Retired
- Launched: 22
- Maiden launch: 30 October 2002 (Soyuz TMA-1)
- Last launch: 14 November 2011 (Soyuz TMA-22)

Related spacecraft
- Derived from: Soyuz TM
- Derivatives: Soyuz TMA-M
- Flown with: Progress M and M1 (cargo versions)
- Launch vehicle: Soyuz FG

The Soyuz-TMA (Russian: транспортный модифицированный антропометрический, romanized: Transportnyi Modifitsirovannyi Antropometricheskii, lit. 'Transport Modified Anthropometric') was a spacecraft built by Energia and used by Roscosmos for human spaceflight. It is a revision of the Soyuz spacecraft introduced in 2001 and was in use until 2012 after being superseded in 2010 by the Soyuz TMA-M. While it looks identical to the earlier Soyuz-TM on the outside, the spacecraft features several changes to accommodate requirements requested by NASA to better service the International Space Station. The most important difference are the anthropometric changes, primarily in the form of new adjustable crew couches that allowed shorter, taller, lighter and heavier passengers to ride in the spacecraft. The Soyuz also received improved parachute systems and a "glass cockpit," a first for an expendable vehicle.

== Design ==
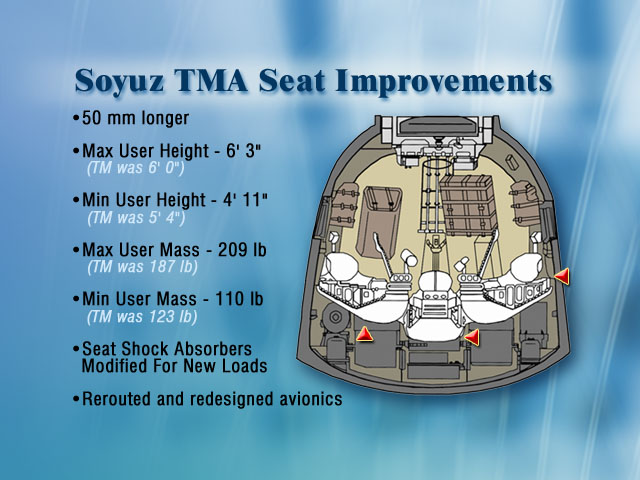
Soyuz-TMA seat improvements

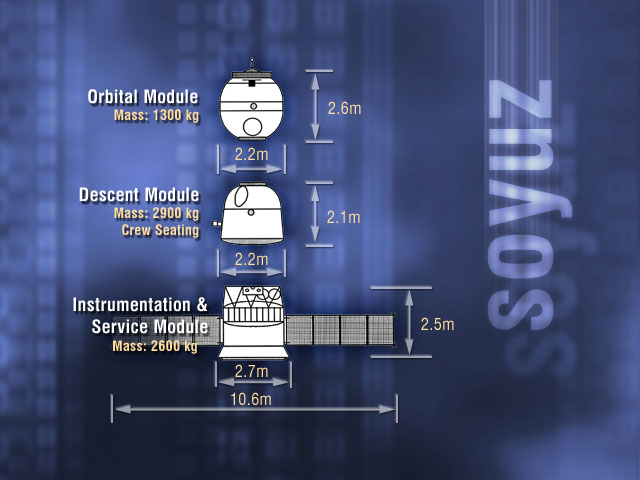
Diagram showing the three elements of the Soyuz-TMA spacecraft.

A Soyuz spacecraft consists of three parts (from front to back):

- A spheroid orbital module
- A small aerodynamic reentry module
- A cylindrical service module with solar panels attached

The first two portions are habitable living space. By moving as much as possible into the orbital module, which does not have to be shielded or decelerated during atmospheric re-entry, the Soyuz three-part craft is both larger and lighter than the two-part Apollo spacecraft's command module. The Apollo command module had six cubic meters of living space and a mass of 5000 kg; the three-part Soyuz provided the same crew with nine cubic meters of living space, an airlock, and a service module for the mass of the Apollo capsule alone. This does not consider the orbital module, that could be used instead of the Apollo Lunar Module.

Soyuz can carry up to three cosmonauts and provide life support for them for about 30 person days. The life support system provides a nitrogen/oxygen atmosphere at sea level partial pressures. The atmosphere is regenerated through KO_{2} cylinders, which absorb most of the CO_{2} and water produced by the crew and regenerates the oxygen, and LiOH cylinders which absorb leftover CO_{2}.

The vehicle is protected during launch by a nose fairing, which is jettisoned after passing through the atmosphere. It has an automatic docking system. The ship can be operated automatically, or by a pilot independently of ground control.

=== Orbital Module (BO) ===
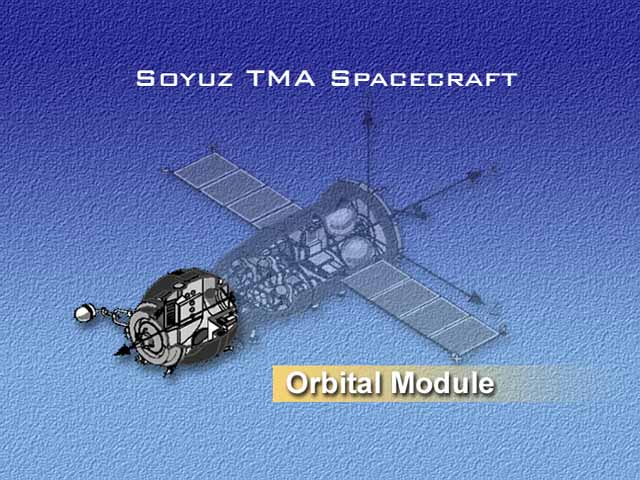
Soyuz spacecraft's Orbital Module

The forepart of the spacecraft is the orbital module ((in Russian): бытовой отсек (BO), Bitovoy otsek) also known as Habitation section. It houses all the equipment that will not be needed for reentry, such as experiments, cameras or cargo. Commonly, it is used as both eating area and lavatory. At its far end, it also contains the docking port. This module also contains a toilet, docking avionics and communications gear. On the latest Soyuz versions, a small window was introduced, providing the crew with a forward view.

A hatch between it and the descent module can be closed so as to isolate it to act as an airlock if needed, cosmonauts exiting through its side port (at the bottom of this picture, near the descent module) on the launch pad, they have entered the spacecraft through this port.

This separation also lets the orbital module be customized to the mission with less risk to the life-critical descent module. The convention of orientation in zero gravity differs from that of the descent module, as cosmonauts stand or sit with their heads to the docking port.

=== Reentry Module (SA) ===
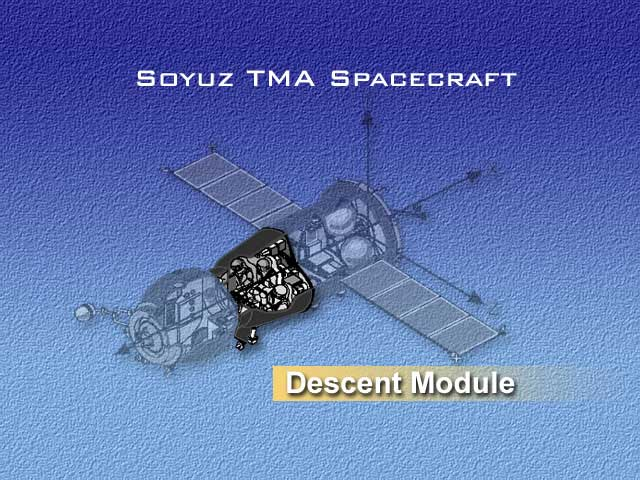
Soyuz spacecraft's Descent Module

The reentry module ((in Russian): спускаемый аппарат (СА), Spuskaemiy apparat (SA)) is used for launch and the journey back to Earth. It is covered by a heat-resistant covering to protect it during re-entry. It is slowed initially by the atmosphere, then by a braking parachute, followed by the main parachute which slows the craft for landing. At one meter above the ground, solid-fuel braking engines mounted behind the heat shield are fired to give a soft landing. One of the design requirements for the reentry module was for it to have the highest possible volumetric efficiency (internal volume divided by hull area). The best shape for this is a sphere, but such a shape can provide no lift, which results in a purely ballistic reentry. Ballistic reentries are hard on the occupants due to high deceleration and can't be steered beyond their initial deorbit burn. That is why it was decided to go with the "headlight" shape that the Soyuz uses — a hemispherical forward area joined by a barely angled conical section (seven degrees) to a classic spherical section heat shield. This shape allows a small amount of lift to be generated due to the unequal weight distribution. The nickname was coined at a time when nearly every automobile headlight was a circular paraboloid.

=== Service Module (PAO) ===
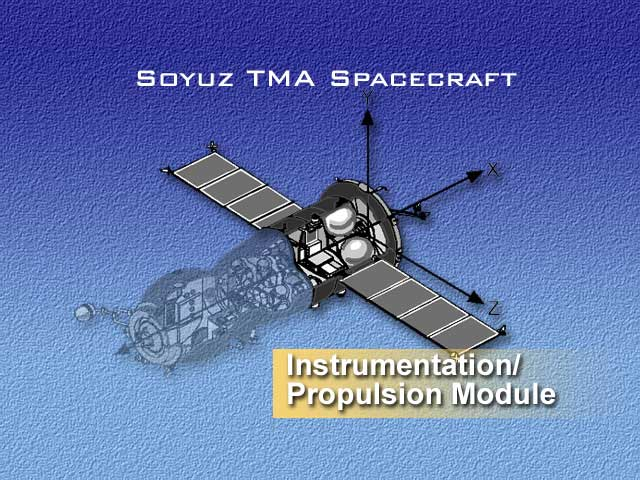
Soyuz spacecraft's Instrumentation/Propulsion Module

At the back of the vehicle is the service module ((in Russian): приборно-агрегатный отсек, Priborno-Agregatniy Otsek (PAO)). It has an instrumentation compartment ((in Russian): приборный отсек, Priborniy Otsek (PO)), a pressurized container shaped like a bulging can that contains systems for temperature control, electric power supply, long-range radio communications, radio telemetry, and instruments for orientation and control. The propulsion compartment ((in Russian): агрегатный отсек, Agregatniy Otsek (AO)), a non-pressurized part of the service module, contains the main engine and a spare: liquid-fuel propulsion systems for maneuvering in orbit and initiating the descent back to Earth. The ship also has a system of low-thrust engines for orientation, attached to the intermediate compartment ((in Russian): переходной отсек, Perekhodnoi Otsek (PkhO)). Outside the service module are the sensors for the orientation system and the solar array, which is oriented towards the Sun by rotating the ship.

=== Re-entry procedure ===
Because its modular construction differs from that of previous designs, the Soyuz has an unusual sequence of events prior to re-entry. The spacecraft is turned engine-forward and the main engine is fired for de-orbiting fully 180° ahead of its planned landing site. This requires the least propellant for re-entry, the spacecraft traveling on an elliptical Hohmann orbit to a point where it will be low enough in the atmosphere to re-enter.

Early Soyuz spacecraft would then have the service and orbital modules detach simultaneously. As they are connected by tubing and electrical cables to the descent module, this would aid in their separation and avoid having the descent module alter its orientation. Later Soyuz spacecraft detach the orbital module before firing the main engine, which saves even more propellant, enabling the descent module to return more payload. In no case can the orbital module remain in orbit as an addition to a space station, for the hatch enabling it to function as an airlock is part of the descent module.

Re-entry firing is typically done on the "dawn" side of the Earth, so that the spacecraft can be seen by recovery helicopters as it descends in the evening twilight, illuminated by the sun when it is above the shadow of the Earth. Since the beginning of Soyuz missions to the ISS, only five have performed nighttime landings.

=== Spacecraft systems ===
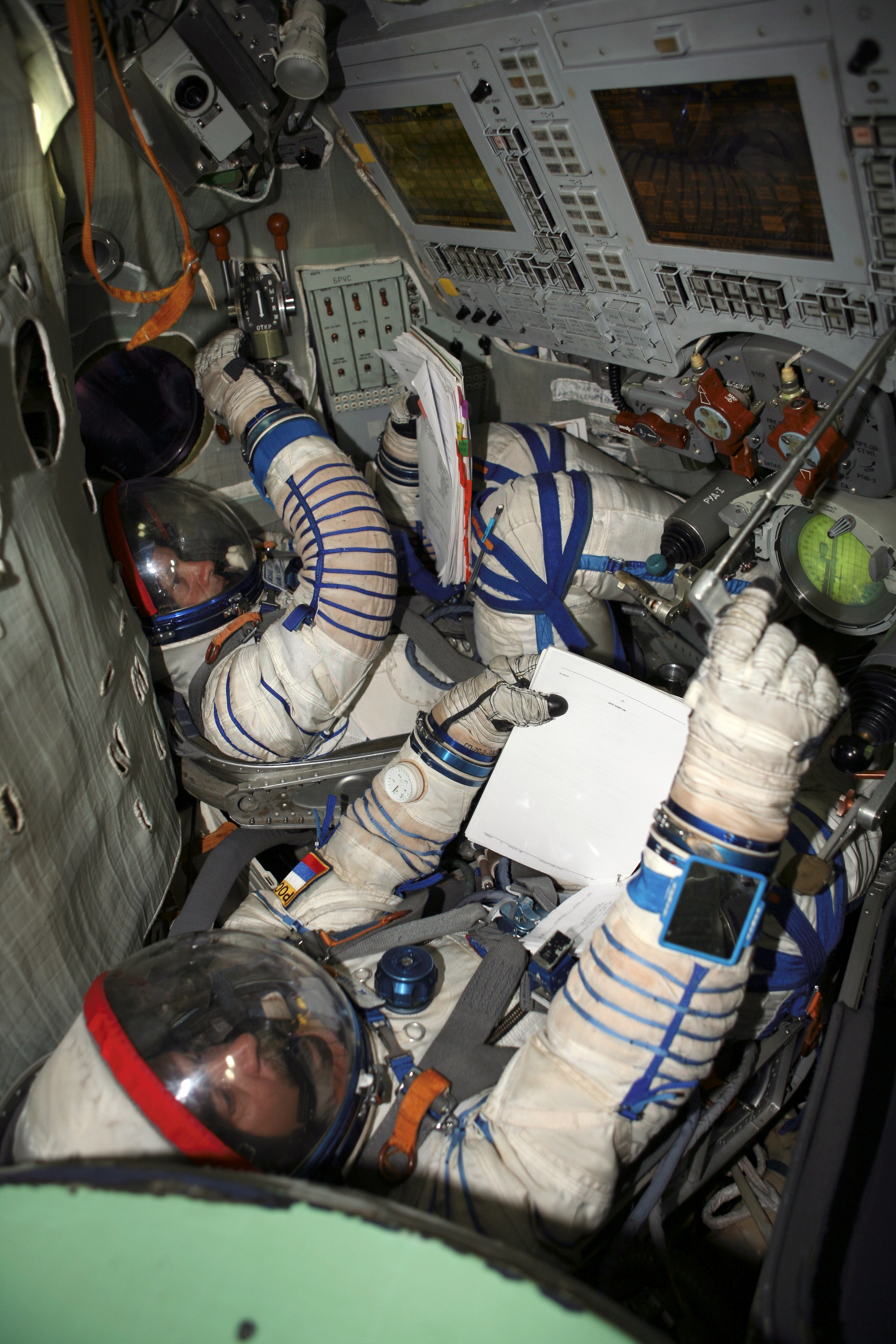
Soyuz-TMA cockpit

- Thermal Control System – Sistema Obespecheniya Teplovogo Rezhima, SOTR - Cистема Обеспечения Теплового Режима, COTP
- Life support system – Kompleks Sredstv Obespecheniya Zhiznideyatelnosti, KSOZh - Комплекс Средств Обеспечения Жизнедеятельности, KCOЖ
- Power Supply System – Sistema Elektropitaniya, SEP - Система Электропитания, CЭП
- Communication and Tracking Systems – Rassvet (Dawn) radio communications system, Onboard Measurement System (SBI), Kvant-V spacecraft control, Klyost-M television system, Orbit Radio Tracking (RKO)
- Onboard Complex Control System – Sistema Upravleniya Bortovym Kompleksom, SUBK - Система Управления Бортовым Комплексом, СУБК
- Combined Propulsion System – Kompleksnaya Dvigatelnaya Ustanovka, KDU - Комплексная Двигательная Установка, КДУ
- Chaika-3 Motion Control System – Sistema Upravleniya Dvizheniem, SUD - Cистема Управления Движением, СУД
- Optical/Visual Devices (OVP)- VSK-4 (Vizir Spetsialniy Kosmicheskiy-4 - Визир Специальный Космический-4), Night Vision Device (VNUK-K, Visir Nochnogo Upravleniya po Kursu - ВНУK-К, Визир Ночного Управления по Курсу), Docking light, Pilot's Sight (VP-1, Vizir Pilota-1 - ВП-1, Визир Пилота-1), Laser Range Finder (LPR-1, Lazerniy Dalnomer-1 - ЛПР-1, Лазерный Дальномер-1)
- Kurs rendezvous system
- Docking System – Sistema Stykovki i Vnutrennego Perekhoda, SSVP - Система Стыковки и Внутреннего Перехода, ССВП
- Teleoperator Control Mode – Teleoperatorniy Rezhim Upravleniya, TORU - Телеоператорный Режим Управления, ТОРУ
- Entry Actuators System – Sistema Ispolnitelnikh Organov Spuska, SIO-S - Система Исполнительных Органов Спуска, СИО-С
- Landing Aids Kit – Kompleks Sredstv Prizemleniya, KSP - Комплекс Средств Приземления, КСП
- Portable Survival Kit – Nosimiy Avariyniy Zapas, NAZ - Носимый Аварийный Запас, НАЗ
- Soyuz launch escape system – Sistema Avariynogo Spaseniya, SAS - Система Аварийного Спасения, САС

== Flights ==
Mission	Launch Vehicle	Crew		Notes	Duration
Mission	Launch Vehicle	Launch	Landing	Notes	Duration
Soyuz TMA-1	Soyuz-FG	(Russia) Sergey Zalyotin (Belgium) Frank De Winne (Russia) Yury Lonchakov	(Russia) Nikolai Budarin (United States) Ken Bowersox (United States) Donald Pettit	Delivered crew to ISS.	185 days
Soyuz TMA-2	Soyuz-FG	(Russia) Yuri Malenchenko (United States) Ed Lu	(Russia) Yuri Malenchenko (United States) Ed Lu (Spain) Pedro Duque	Delivered Expedition 7/8 crew to ISS.	184 days
Soyuz TMA-3	Soyuz-FG	(Russia) Aleksandr Kaleri (United States) (United Kingdom) Michael Foale (Spain) Pedro Duque	(Russia) Aleksandr Kaleri (United States) (United Kingdom) Michael Foale (Netherlands) André Kuipers	Delivered Expedition 8/9 crew to ISS.	194 days
Soyuz TMA-4	Soyuz-FG	(Russia) Gennady Padalka (United States) Michael Fincke (Netherlands) André Kuipers	(Russia) Gennady Padalka (United States) Michael Fincke (Russia) Yuri Shargin	Delivered Expedition 9/10 crew to ISS.	187 days
Soyuz TMA-5	Soyuz-FG	(Russia) Salizhan Sharipov (United States) Leroy Chiao (Russia) Yuri Shargin	(Russia) Salizhan Sharipov (United States) Leroy Chiao (Italy) Roberto Vittori	Delivered Expedition 10/11 crew to ISS.	192 days
Soyuz TMA-6	Soyuz-FG	(Russia) Sergei Krikalev (United States) John L. Phillips (Italy) Roberto Vittori	(Russia) Sergei Krikalev (United States) John L. Phillips (United States) Gregory Olsen	Delivered Expedition 11/12 crew to ISS.	179 days
Soyuz TMA-7	Soyuz-FG	(Russia) Valeri Tokarev (United States) William S. McArthur (United States) Gregory Olsen	(Russia) Valeri Tokarev (United States) William S. McArthur (Brazil) Marcos Pontes	Delivered Expedition 12/13 crew to ISS.	189 days
Soyuz TMA-8	Soyuz-FG	(Russia) Pavel Vinogradov (United States) Jeffrey Williams (Brazil) Marcos Pontes	(Russia) Pavel Vinogradov (United States) Jeffrey Williams (Iran) (United States) Anousheh Ansari	Delivered Expedition 13/14 crew to ISS.	182 days
Soyuz TMA-9	Soyuz-FG	(Russia) Mikhail Tyurin (United States) Michael López-Alegría (Iran) (United States) Anousheh Ansari	(Russia) Mikhail Tyurin (United States) Michael López-Alegría (Hungary) (United States) Charles Simonyi	Delivered Expedition 14/15 crew to ISS.	215 days
Soyuz TMA-10	Soyuz-FG	(Russia) Oleg Kotov (Russia) Fyodor Yurchikhin (Hungary) (United States) Charles Simonyi	(Russia) Oleg Kotov (Russia) Fyodor Yurchikhin (Malaysia) Sheikh Muszaphar Shukor	Delivered Expedition 15/16 crew to ISS.	196 days
Soyuz TMA-11	Soyuz-FG	(Russia) Yuri Malenchenko (United States) Peggy Whitson (Malaysia) Sheikh Muszaphar Shukor	(Russia) Yuri Malenchenko (United States) Peggy Whitson (South Korea) Yi So-yeon	Delivered Expedition 16/17 crew to ISS.	191 days
Soyuz TMA-12	Soyuz-FG	(Russia) Sergey Volkov (Russia) (Turkmenistan) Oleg Kononenko (South Korea) Yi So-yeon	(Russia) Sergey Volkov (Russia) (Turkmenistan) Oleg Kononenko (United Kingdom) (United States) Richard Garriott	Delivered Expedition 17/18 crew to ISS.	198 days
Soyuz TMA-13	Soyuz-FG	(Russia) Yury Lonchakov (United States) Michael Fincke (United Kingdom) (United States) Richard Garriott	(Russia) Yury Lonchakov (United States) Michael Fincke (Hungary) (United States) Charles Simonyi	Delivered Expedition 18/19 crew to ISS.	178 days
Soyuz TMA-14	Soyuz-FG	(Russia) Gennady Padalka (United States) Michael Barratt (Hungary) (United States) Charles Simonyi	(Russia) Gennady Padalka (United States) Michael Barratt (Canada) Guy Laliberté	Delivered Expedition 19/20 crew to ISS.	198 days
Soyuz TMA-15	Soyuz-FG	(Russia) Roman Romanenko (Belgium) Frank De Winne (Canada) Robert Thirsk		Delivered Expedition 20/21 crew to ISS.	188 days
Soyuz TMA-16	Soyuz-FG	(Russia) Maksim Surayev (United States) Jeffrey Williams (Canada) Guy Laliberté	(Russia) Maksim Surayev (United States) Jeffrey Williams	Delivered Expedition 21/22 crew to ISS.	168 days
Soyuz TMA-17	Soyuz-FG	(Russia) Oleg Kotov (United States) Timothy Creamer (Japan) Soichi Noguchi		Delivered Expedition 22/23 crew to ISS.	164 days
Soyuz TMA-18	Soyuz-FG	(Russia) Aleksandr Skvortsov (Russia) Mikhail Kornienko (United States) Tracy Caldwell Dyson		Delivered Expedition 23/24 crew to ISS.	176 days
Soyuz TMA-19	Soyuz-FG	(Russia) Fyodor Yurchikhin (United States) Shannon Walker (United States) Douglas H. Wheelock		Delivered Expedition 24/25 crew to ISS.	164 days
Soyuz TMA-20	Soyuz-FG	(Russia) Dmitri Kondratyev (United States) Catherine Coleman (Italy) Paolo Nespoli		Delivered Expedition 26/27 crew to ISS.	159 days
Soyuz TMA-21	Soyuz-FG	(Russia) Aleksandr Samokutyaev (Russia) Andrey Borisenko (United States) Ronald J. Garan Jr.		Delivered Expedition 27/28 crew to ISS.	164 days
Soyuz TMA-22	Soyuz-FG	(Russia) Anton Shkaplerov (Russia) Anatoly Ivanishin (United States) Daniel C. Burbank		Delivered Expedition 29/30 crew to ISS.	165 days
