= List of Dutch astronauts =

As of 2026, the Netherlands is the country of birth to three astronauts. Two of the three astronauts flew to space on board a Space Shuttle while André Kuipers used the Russian Soyuz to reach space.

== List ==
Image	Name	Mission	Mission start	Mission duration	Space station	Mission objectives
	Lodewijk van den Berg	STS-51B	April 29, 1985	7 days, 0 hours, 8 minutes		Scientific experiments in the Spacelab Module
	Wubbo Ockels	STS-61-A	October 30, 1985	7 days, 0 hours, 44 minutes		Scientific experiments in the Spacelab Module
	André Kuipers	Soyuz TMA-4 / Soyuz TMA-3	April 19, 2004	10 days, 20 hours, 52 minutes	ISS	
	André Kuipers	Soyuz TMA-03M	December 21, 2011	190 days, 13 hours, 28 minutes	ISS	

== Lodewijk van den Berg ==
The first Dutch-born astronaut to have been to space is Lodewijk van den Berg. He was born on 24 March 1932 in Sluiskil, Zeeland. Van den Berg was launched aboard Space Shuttle Challenger on April 29, 1985, as a Payload Specialist of mission STS-51B. During the seven-day mission, he conducted several experiments on crystal growth.

At the time of his flight, Van den Berg was not a Dutch citizen, having been naturalised as United States citizen; by Dutch law he had to revoke his citizenship.

== Wubbo Ockels ==
The second Dutch-born astronaut and first Dutch citizen to have been to space is Wubbo Ockels. He was born on 28 March 1946 in Almelo, Overijssel. Ockels rocketed towards space aboard Space Shuttle Challenger on October 30, 1985 – just over half a year after Lodewijk van den Berg – as a Payload Specialist of mission STS-61A. He died on 18 May 2014 in Amsterdam.

== André Kuipers ==
The third Dutch-born astronaut and second Dutch citizen to have been to space is André Kuipers. He was born 5 October 1958 in Amsterdam. Kuipers, unlike his two predecessors, was launched by a Soyuz spacecraft: Soyuz TMA-4. He served as flight engineer. During his eleven-day trip towards the International Space Station (ISS), he conducted twenty-one experiments on a wide range of subjects.

Kuipers's second mission was ISS Expedition 30 (as Flight Engineer 4); he also participated in ISS Expedition 31 (as Flight Engineer 1). He was launched from Baikonur on 21 December 2011 and returned on 1 July 2012.

== Oliver Daemen ==
While Dutch native Oliver Daemen (born 20 August 2002) was part of the Blue Origin NS-16 flight on 20 July 2021, this was a sub-orbital commercial spaceflight. To distinguish between space tourism and professional astronauts, the term astronaut is reserved for the latter category and as such, Daemen is not considered an astronaut.
