= Arges project =

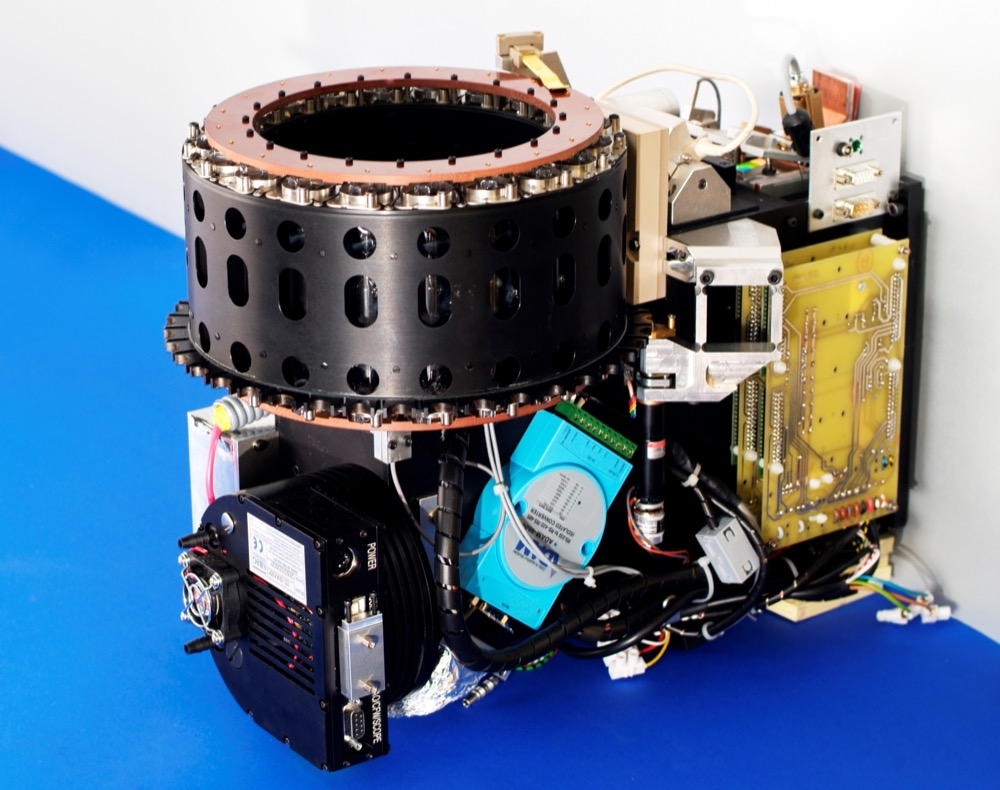
Carroussel of metal-halide lamps, used for testing aboard the ISS

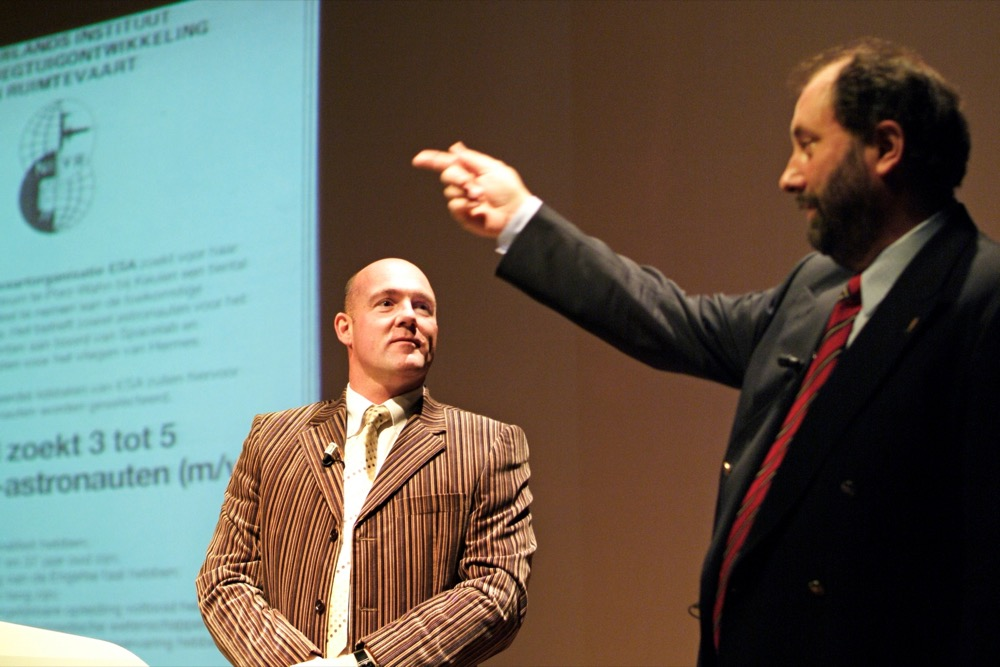
Astronaut André Kuipers and Arges head scientist Gerrit Kroesen at Eindhoven University of Technology

The Arges project was a research project in the field of metal-halide lamps, a form of electric lighting. The aim was to achieve a higher degree of energy efficiency in comparison to lamps used at the time. The project was commissioned by Eindhoven University of Technology and Philips Electronics. One of the problems which had to be solved was to let the experimental lamps burn reliably and constantly. Scientists believed that this problem was related to gravity, and to ascertain this experiments had to be performed in zero gravity. Therefore, part of the research took place aboard the International Space Station ISS during the Delta Mission in 2004. Dutch astronaut André Kuipers operated the apparatus transported to the ISS aboard the Soyuz TMA-4.

== Literature ==
- "Arges Ruimtevaart (zero gravity)". Eindhoven University of Technology.
- Kroesen, Gerrit; Marco Haverlag; Erwin Dekkers; Jovita Moerel; Rob de Kluijver; Peter Brinkgreve; Charlotte Groothuis; Joost van der Mullen; Winfred Stoffels; Rob Keijser; Mark Bax; Danny van den Akker; Guido Schiffelers; Pim Kemps; Frank van den Hout; André Kuipers (March 2005). "ARGES: Radial segregation and helical instabilities in metal halide lamps studied under microgravity conditions in the International Space Station". Microgravity Science and Technology. 16 (1–4): 191–195. Bibcode:2005MicST..16..191K. doi:10.1007/BF02945974. ISSN 1875-0494. S2CID 59451783.
- Kroesen: “Wetenschappelijk rendement proef in ruimte honderd procent”. Cursor 2004
