= Expedition 9 =

Long-duration mission to the International Space Station

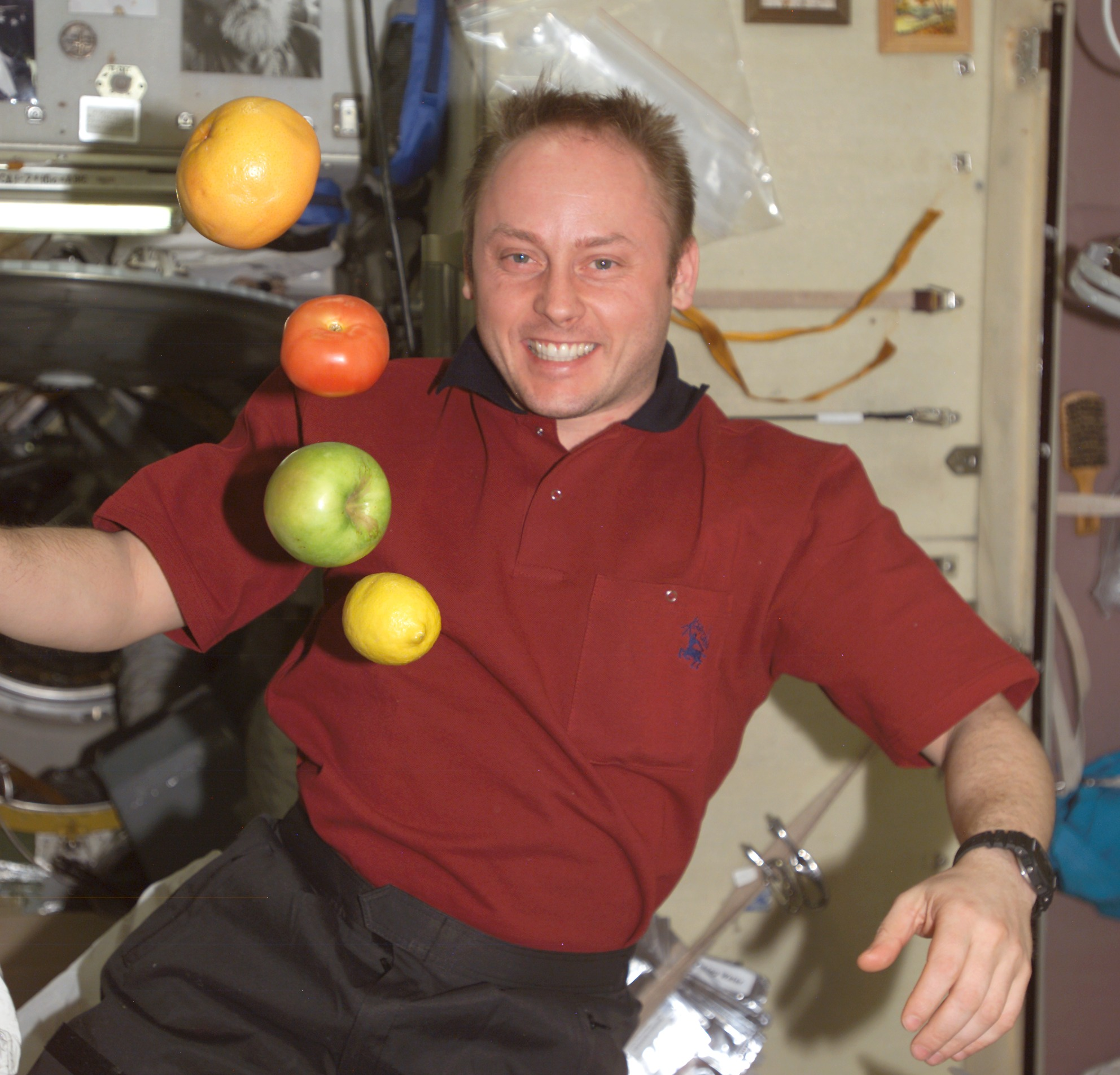
- Edward M. (Mike) Fincke, Expedition 9 NASA ISS science officer and flight engineer, is pictured near fresh fruit floating freely in the Zvezda Service Module of the International Space Station.
- Mission type: Long-duration expedition
- Mission duration: 185 days, 15 hours, 7 minutes (at ISS); 187 days, 21 hours, 16 minutes (launch to landing)
- Distance travelled: ~121,802,083 kilometres (75,684,306 mi)
- Orbits completed: 2,940

Expedition
- Space station: International Space Station
- Began: 21 April 2004, 05:01 UTC
- Ended: 23 October 2004, 20:08 UTC
- Arrived aboard: Soyuz TMA-4
- Departed aboard: Soyuz TMA-4

Crew
- Crew size: 2
- Members: Gennady I. Padalka; E. Michael Fincke
- EVAs: 4
- EVA duration: 15 hours, 45 minutes
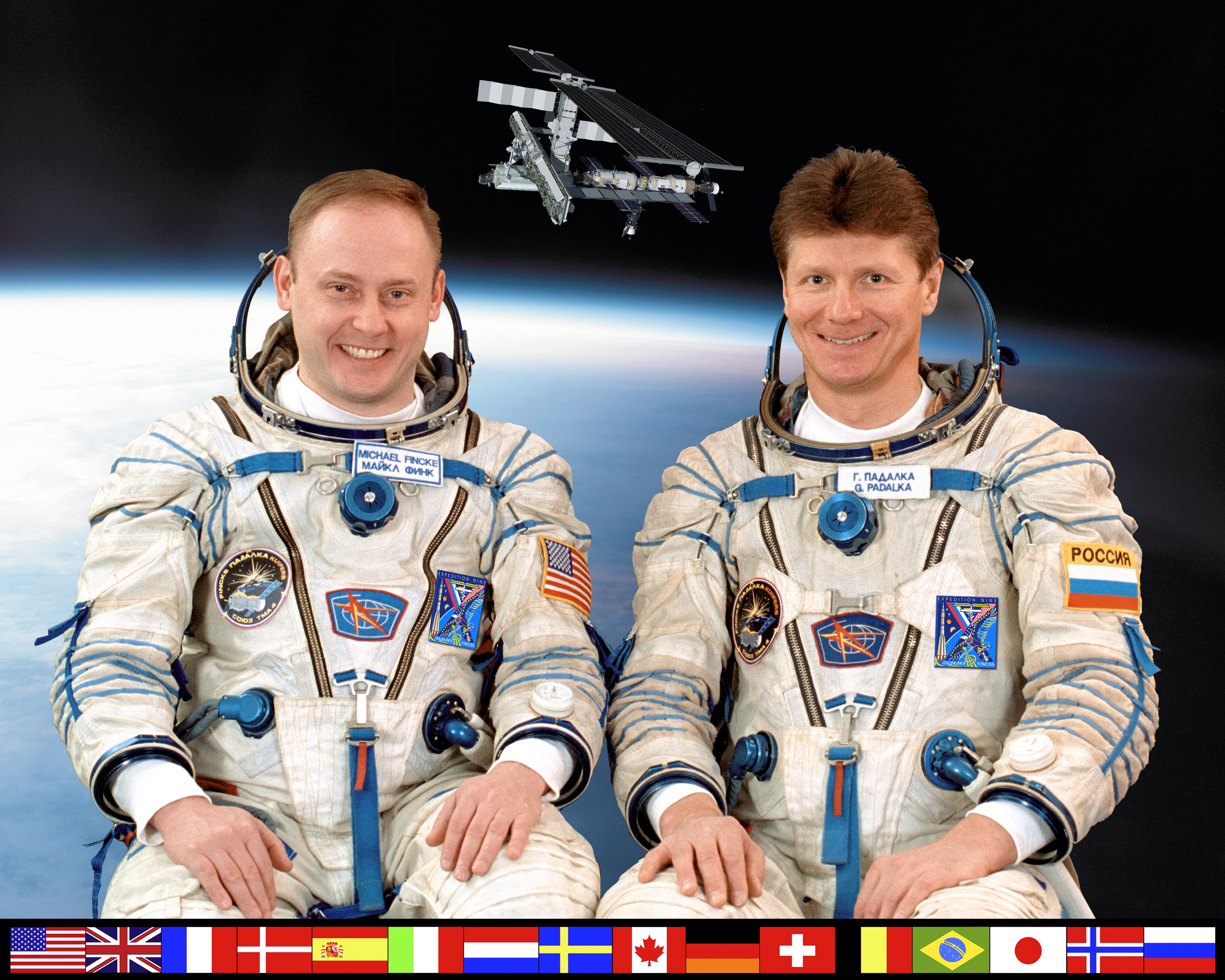
- Expedition 9 mission patch L-R: Edward Fincke and Gennady Padalka ISS expeditions

Expedition 9 (2004) was the ninth expedition to the International Space Station (21 April 2004 – 23 October 2004).

== Crew ==
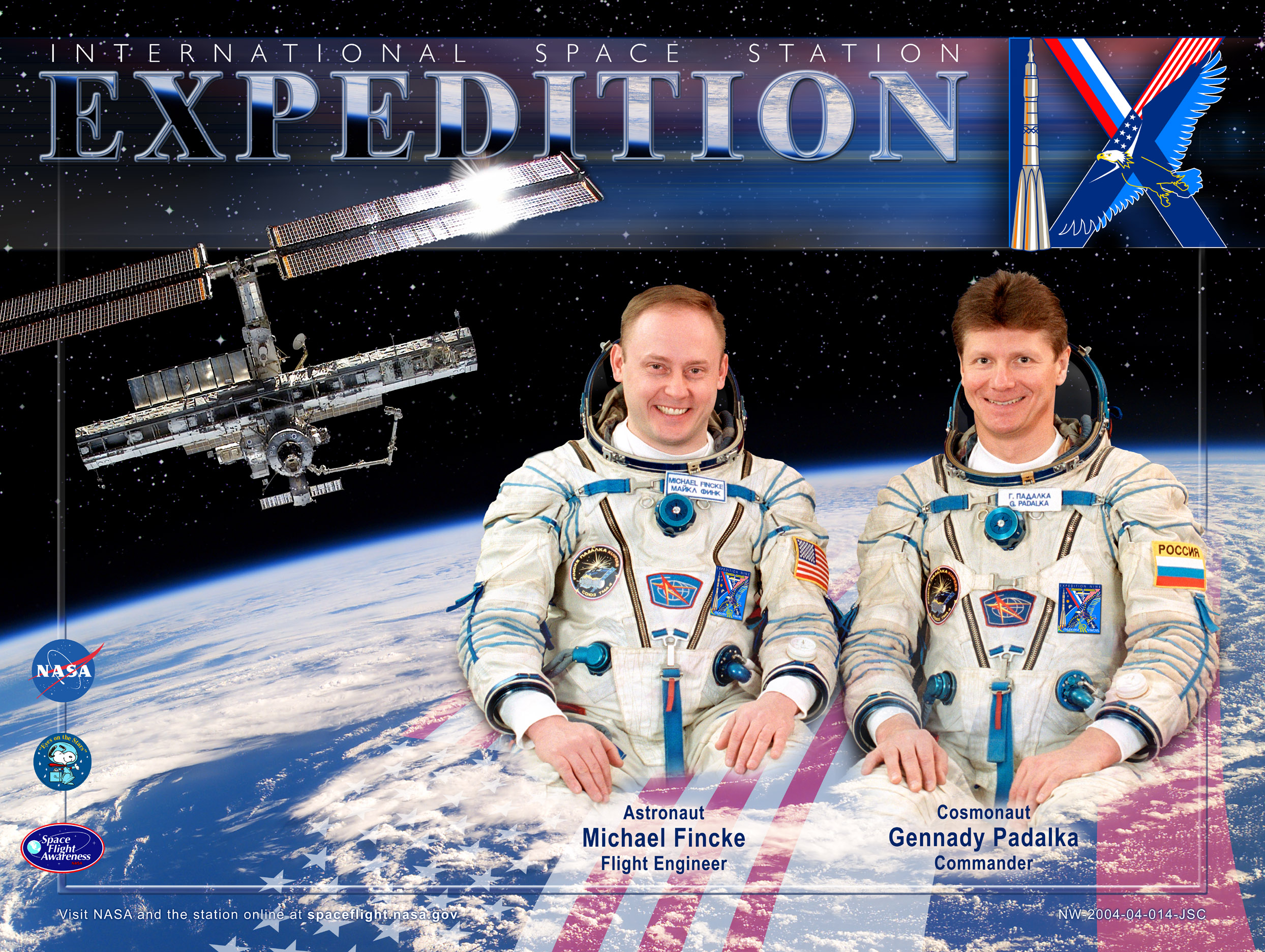
Expedition 9 promotional poster

Prime crew
Position	Crew
Commander	Gennady Padalka, RSA; Second spaceflight
Flight Engineer	Michael Fincke, NASA; First spaceflight

Backup crew
Position	Crew
Commander	Leroy Chiao, NASA
Flight Engineer	Salizhan Sharipov, RSA

=== Planned crew before Columbia disaster ===
Position	Crew
Commander	Gennady Padalka, RSA
Flight Engineer	Michael Fincke, NASA
Flight Engineer	Oleg Kononenko, RSA

== Mission parameters ==
- Perigee: 384 km
- Apogee: 396 km
- Inclination: 51.6°
- Period: 92 min

== Mission objectives ==
Padalka and Fincke arrived at the Station on 21 April 2004 aboard the Soyuz TMA-4 spacecraft with European Space Agency (ESA) Astronaut André Kuipers. After more than a week of joint operations and handover activities, Padalka and Fincke officially took command of the Station on 29 April when Expedition 8 Commander Michael Foale and Flight Engineer Alexander Kaleri left the Station. This mission was the site for the Advanced Diagnostic Ultrasound in Microgravity Project.

Expedition 8 and Kuipers returned to Earth that same day aboard the Soyuz TMA-3 spacecraft. Kuipers' 11-day mission to the ISS was part of a commercial agreement between ESA and the Federal Space Agency of Russia.

== Spacewalks ==
The Expedition 9 crew conducted four spacewalks during its stay at the International Space Station. The four spacewalks were devoted to ISS maintenance and assembly. All four were based out of the Pirs Docking Compartment and used Russian Orlan spacesuits.

Before these four extravehicular activities (EVAs), 52 spacewalks had been performed at the ISS, with 27 based out of the Station.

Gennady Padalka (EV1): red stripes Mike Fincke (EV2): blue stripes

Mission	Spacewalkers	Start (UTC)	End (UTC)	Duration
Expedition 9 EVA 1	Gennady Padalka; Mike Fincke	24 June 2004; 21:56	24 June 2004; 22:10	14 minutes
Expedition 9 EVA 1	The spacewalk was cut short due to a pressure problem in Fincke's prime oxygen tank in his spacesuit. Mission managers decided to reschedule the spacewalk for 29 June.			
Expedition 9 EVA 2	Gennady Padalka; Mike Fincke	29 June 2004; 21:19	30 June 2004; 02:59	5 hours 40 minutes
Expedition 9 EVA 2	Padalka and Fincke replaced a Remote Power Controller (RPCM) that failed in late April, causing a loss of power in Control Moment Gyroscope No. 2 (CMG 2). A failed Remote Power Controller Module was responsible for the temporary loss of CMG 2 in April. The gyroscope is one of four that control the ISS' orientation.			
Expedition 9 EVA 3	Gennady Padalka; Mike Fincke	3 August 2004; 06:58	3 August 2004; 11:28	4 hours 30 minutes
Expedition 9 EVA 3	In preparation for the arrival of the European Space Agency's Automated Transfer Vehicle (ATV), Padalka and Fincke removed laser retro reflectors from the Zvezda Service Module assembly compartment and installed three updated laser retro reflectors and one internal videometer target. They installed two antennas. The spacewalkers removed Kromka Panel No. 2 and installed Kromka Panel No. 3. The Kromka experiment exposes various materials to the space environment. They also replaced another materials science experiment.			
Expedition 9 EVA 4	Gennady Padalka; Mike Fincke	3 September 2004; 16:43	3 September 2004; 22:04	5 hours 20 minutes
Expedition 9 EVA 4	Expedition 9's fourth scheduled EVA prepared the Station for future assembly operations and the arrival of the ATV. The spacewalkers replaced the Zarya Control Module flow control panel and installed four safety tether fairleads on Zarya's handrails. ATV support operations included installing equipment for the air-to-air radio link antennas and removing all covers from antennas. Other tasks included installing a Pressure Control and Exposure Monitor Sensor on Pirs and installing protective components on the brackets of Pirs' ring handrails on EVA Hatch No. 2.			

== Mission patch ==
The design of the Expedition 9 mission patch includes a tribute to astronauts and cosmonauts who gave their lives in space exploration. The outspread wings of the eagle have 16 stars and 1 star of David. They represent the Apollo 1 crew Gus Grissom, Ed White and Roger Chaffee. Space Shuttle Challenger STS-51L crew Dick Scobee, Michael J. Smith, Ronald McNair, Ellison Onizuka, Gregory Jarvis, Judith Resnik and Christa McAuliffe. Space Shuttle Columbia STS-107 crew Rick Husband, William C. McCool, David M. Brown, Kalpana Chawla, Michael P. Anderson, Laurel Clark and Ilan Ramon, the first Israeli astronaut. Around the eagles neck are 4 small red stars and one larger red star. The large star is for Yuri Gagarin, the first man in space during Vostok 1, who was killed during training for Soyuz 3. The other 4 are for Soyuz 1 cosmonaut Vladimir Komarov, Soyuz 11 crew Georgi Dobrovolski, Viktor Patsayev and Vladislav Volkov.
