= André Kuipers =

Dutch astronaut (born 1958)

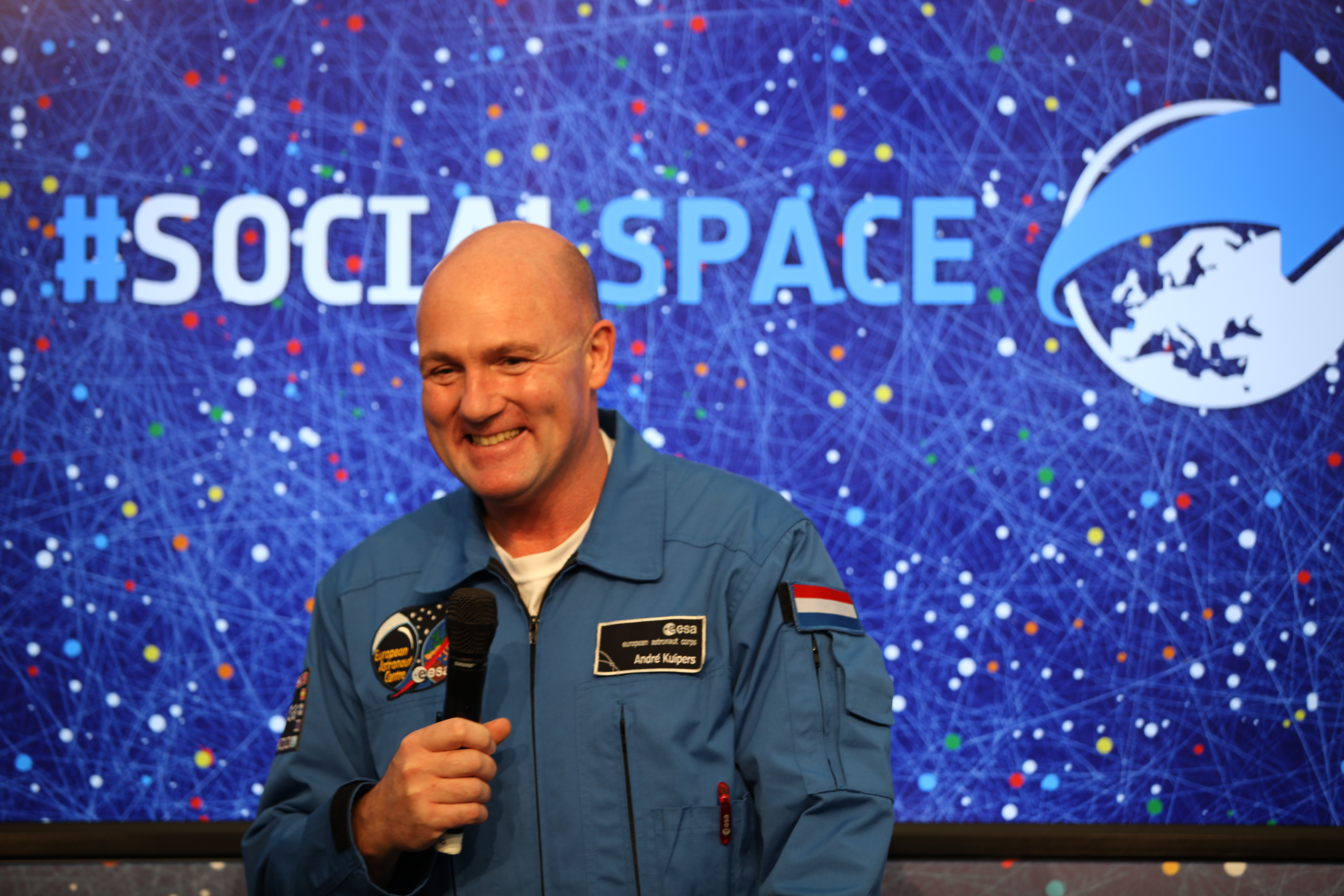
- André Kuipers in 2013
- Born: 5 October 1958 (age 67); Amsterdam, Netherlands
- Occupation: Physician
- Space career

ESA astronaut
- Status: Retired
- Time in space: 203d 15h 50m
- Selection: 1998 ESA Group
- Missions: Soyuz TMA-4/TMA-3, Soyuz TMA-03M (Expedition 30/31)
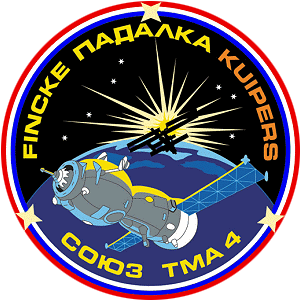
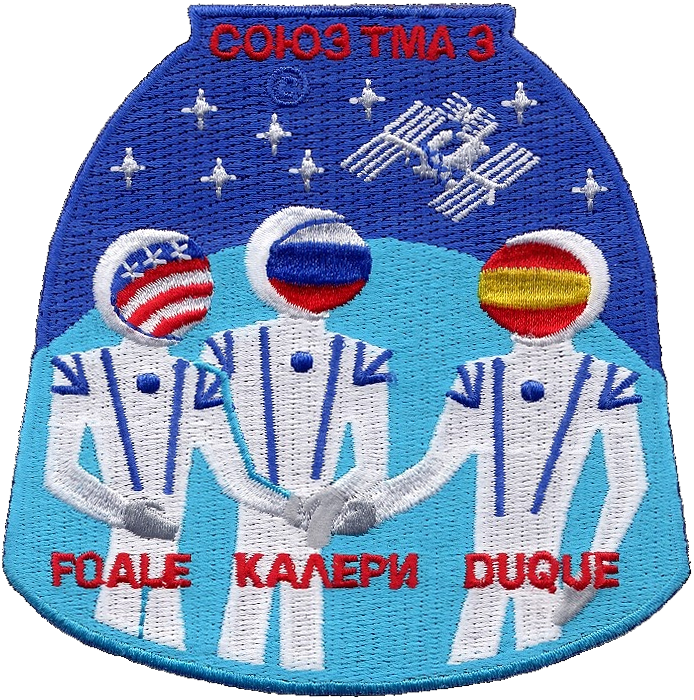
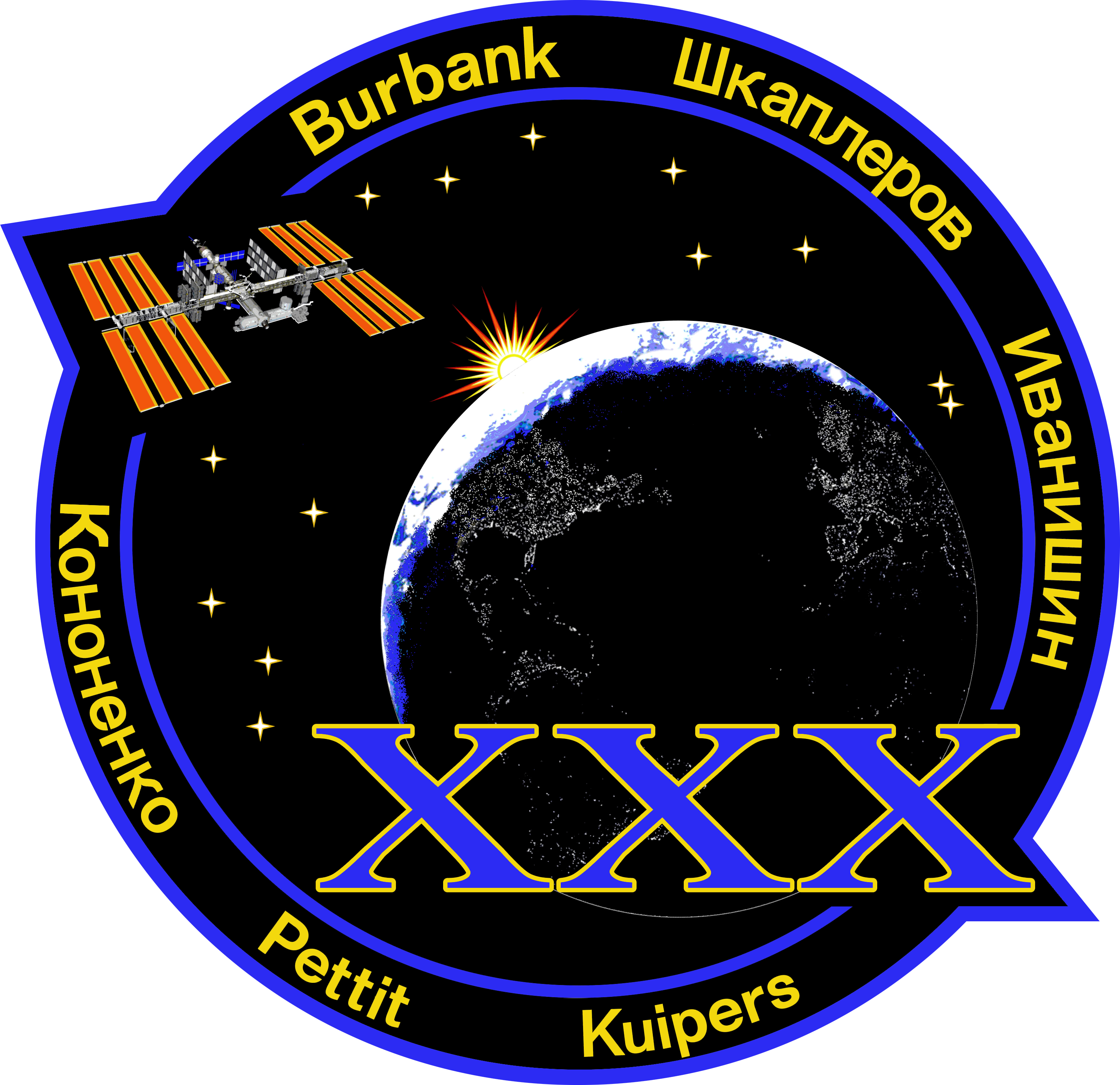
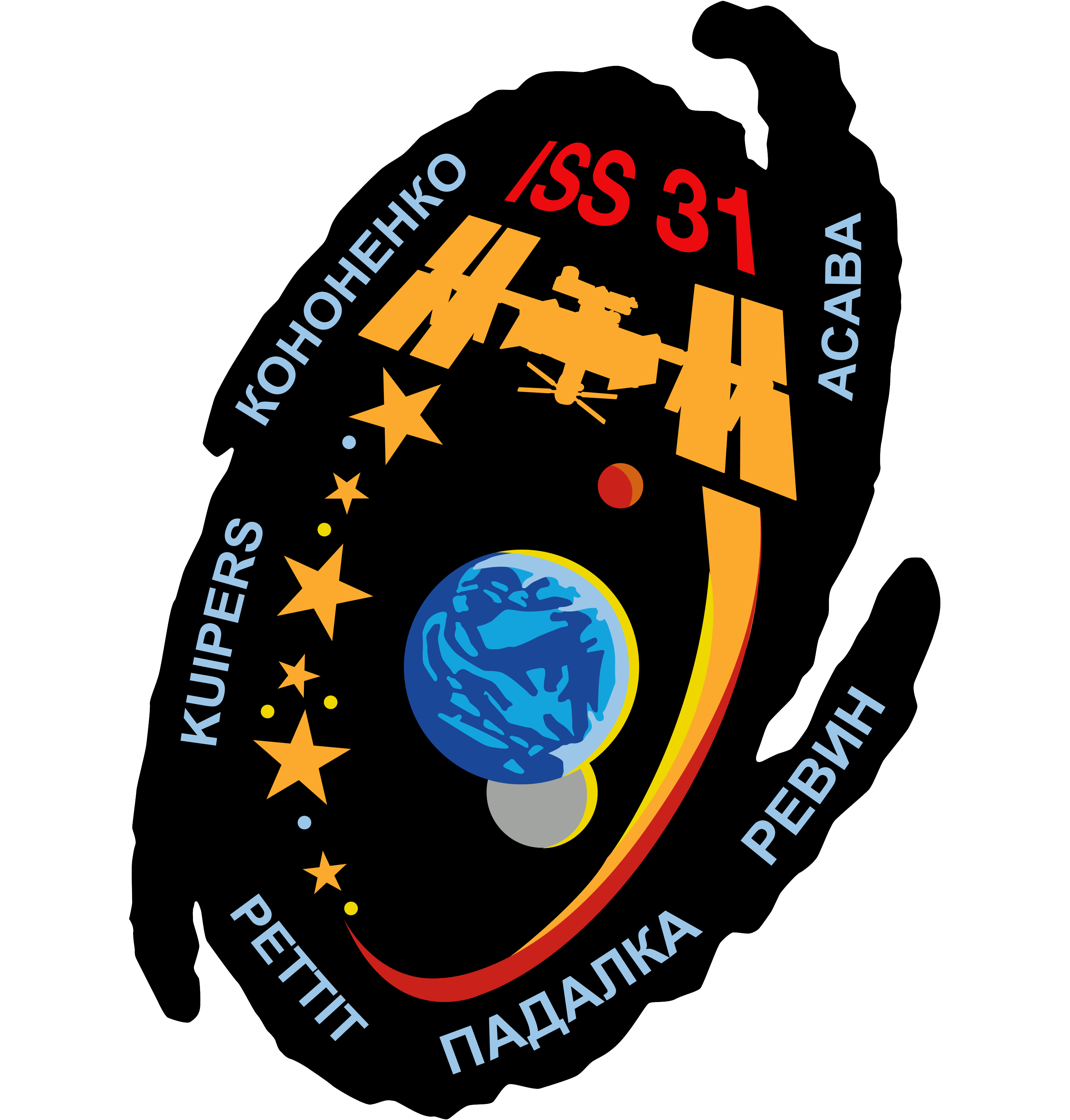
- Mission insignia
- Retired: November 1, 2018

André Kuipers (Dutch: [ˈɑndreː ˈkœypərs]; born 5 October 1958) is a Dutch physician and ESA astronaut. He became the second Dutch citizen, third Dutch-born and fifth Dutch-speaking astronaut upon launch of Soyuz TMA-4 on 19 April 2004. Kuipers returned to Earth aboard Soyuz TMA-3 11 days later.

Kuipers is the first Dutch astronaut to return to space. On 5 August 2009, Dutch minister of economic affairs Maria van der Hoeven, announced Kuipers was selected as an astronaut for International Space Station (ISS) Expeditions 30 and 31. He was launched to space on 21 December 2011 and returned to Earth on 1 July 2012.

== Personal life and education ==
André Kuipers was born on 5 October 1958 in Amsterdam, in the Netherlands. He graduated from high school in Amsterdam in 1977, and received a medical degree from the University of Amsterdam in 1987. He is married and has three daughters and a son.

When interviewed about his youth, Kuipers stated that he dreamed of becoming an astronaut ever since he was a teenager. His dreams became reality when he was selected to the European Astronaut Corps in 1998.

== Space flight experience ==
Kuipers has flown two space missions: first the DELTA mission in 2004. In May 2009, he served as the backup of Belgian astronaut Frank de Winne, who later became the Expedition 21 commander, during the later part of his six-month mission. On 21 December 2011, Kuipers was launched for his second spaceflight PromISSe on Expedition 30 and Expedition 31. He returned to Earth on 1 July 2012.

=== DELTA Mission ===
==== Launch and docking ====
Using the Soyuz TMA-4, mounted atop a Soyuz-FG rocket, Kuipers and his fellow cosmonauts Gennady Padalka (Russia) and Michael Fincke (USA) rocketed towards the ISS in the early morning of 19 April 2004. The spacecraft flawlessly docked to the ISS two days later.

==== Experiments ====
As part of his DELTA mission, Kuipers conducted 21 experiments in orbit on a wide range of subjects: physiology, biology, microbiology, medicine, technological development, physics and Earth observation. One of the experiments in the field of technological development was related to the development of more energy-efficient lighting. The so-called Arges project, of which Kuipers' experiment formed a part, was commissioned by Eindhoven University of Technology and Philips Electronics. Maybe the best-known experiment involved plant growth: Seeds in Space. Kuipers cooperated with primary school children in the Netherlands to compare results of plant growth from orbit with those from Earth.

==== Landing ====
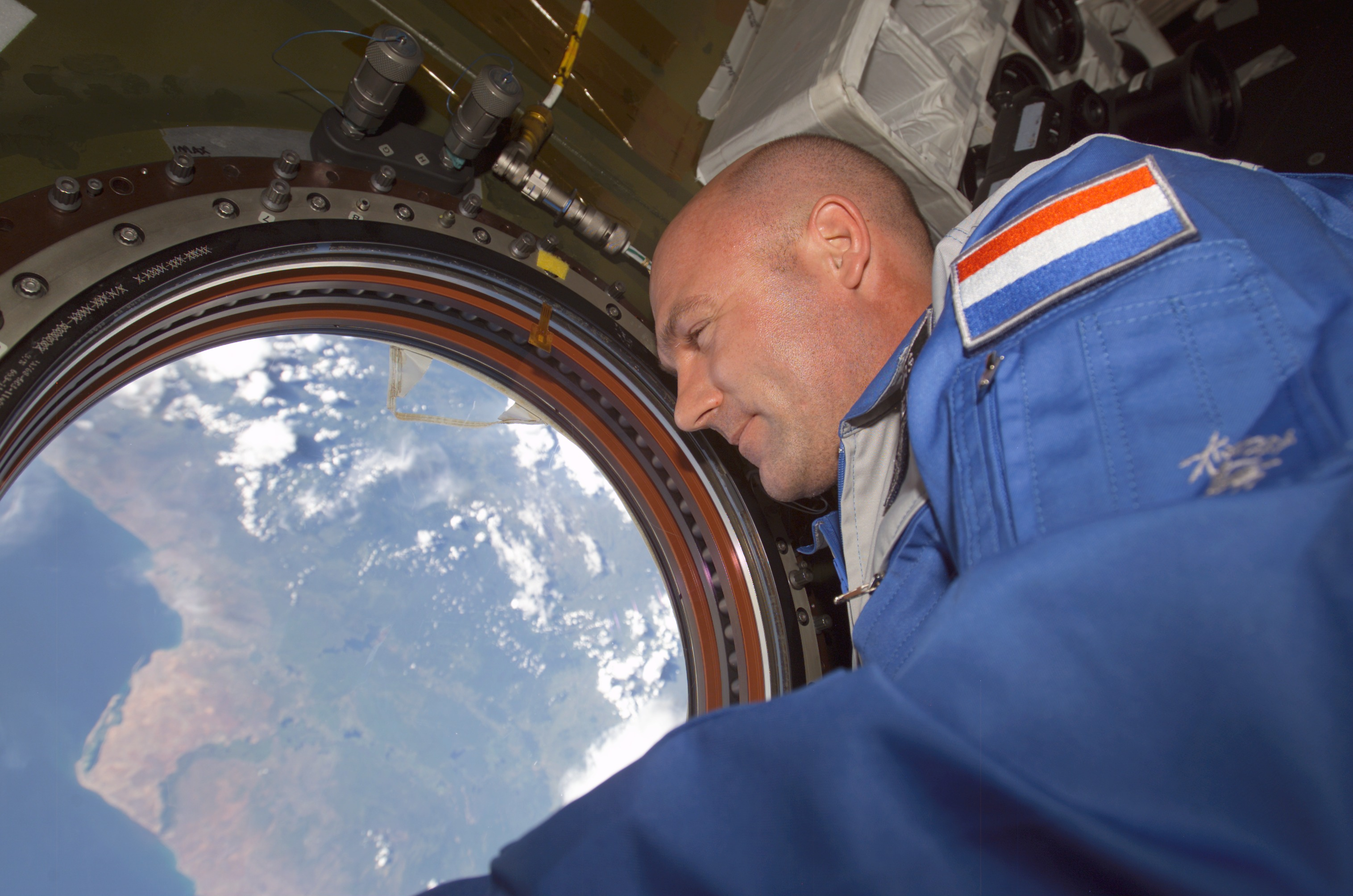
Kuipers looking at Earth from the International Space Station in 2004

Padalka and Fincke remained on board the ISS for six months, as the Expedition 9 crew.

Kuipers returned to Earth nearly eleven days after launch on 30 April, joined by departing ISS crew members Alexander Kaleri (Russia) and Michael Foale (US), who thereby ended their six-month stay on board the ISS.

=== Expedition 30/31 ===
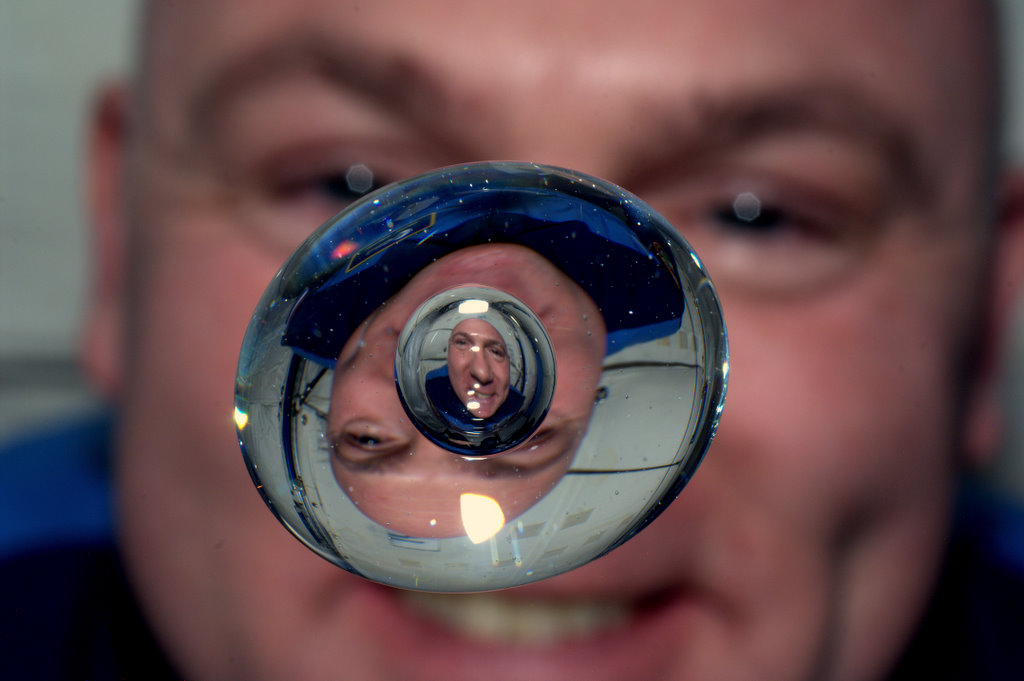
Kuipers experimenting with a water drop in weightlessness in 2012

On 26 November 2008, Dutch minister of economic affairs Maria van der Hoeven pushed for a second, six-month mission for Kuipers in 2011. In the same speech, she said she would support the ISS project with an extra "few" million euros.

After a call with ESA director general Jean-Jacques Dordain on 4 August 2009, Maria van der Hoeven confirmed on 5 August that Kuipers would be making a second space flight, starting in December 2011. Kuipers was the first astronaut to be selected for ISS Expeditions 30 and 31. Kuipers launched on 21 December 2011 on the Soyuz TMA-03M flight with his two fellow crew members Cosmonaut Oleg Kononenko from the Russian Space Agency Roscosmos, and Don Pettit from NASA. They arrived at the station on 23 December 2011 when their Soyuz docked to the Rassvet module on the Russian side. They returned to Earth on 1 July 2012, when their Soyuz TMA-03M touched down in the steppe of Kazakhstan.

== Honours ==
- Officer of the Order of Orange-Nassau (17 May 2004, Netherlands)
- Knight of the Order of the Netherlands Lion (15 October 2012, Netherlands)
- Honorary citizen of Haarlemmermeer (15 October 2012, Netherlands)
- Honorary doctorate of the University of Amsterdam (8 January 2013, Netherlands)
- Recipient of the Order of Friendship (3 July 2013, Russian Federation)
- King of Arms at the inauguration of King Willem-Alexander, 2013
