= Yuri Shargin =

Russian cosmonaut (born 1960)

- Юрий Шаргин
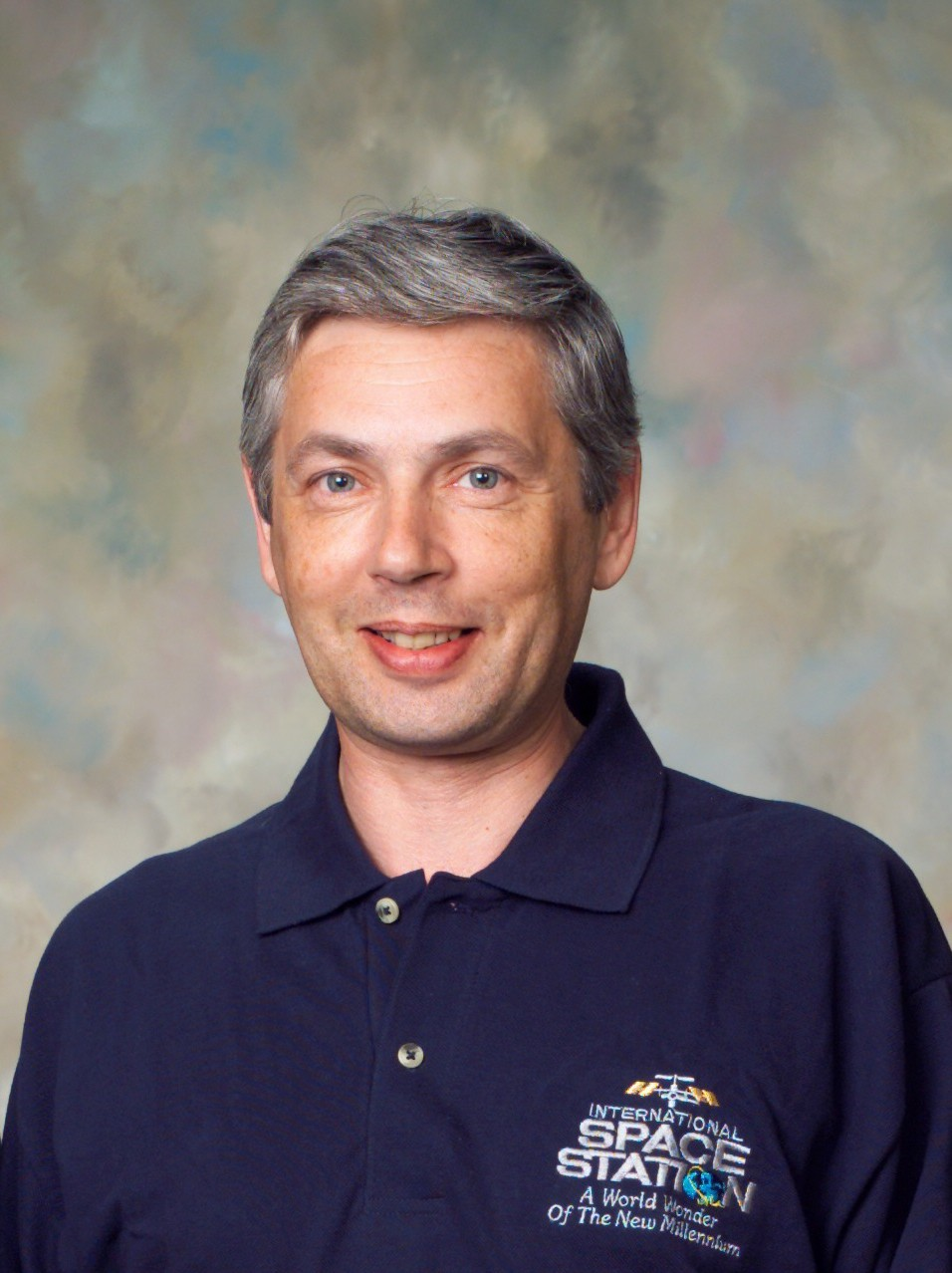
- Born: March 20, 1960 (age 66); Engels, RSFSR, Soviet Union
- Occupation: Aeronautics
- Space career

RKA Cosmonaut
- Status: Retired
- Rank: Lieutenant Colonel, Russian Space Forces
- Time in space: 9d 21h 30m
- Selection: 1996 RKA Group
- Missions: Soyuz TMA-5, Soyuz TMA-4

Yuri Georgiyevich Shargin (Russian: Юрий Георгиевич Шаргин) is a retired cosmonaut of the Russian Space Forces.

== Biography ==
He was born March 20, 1960, in Engels, Saratov Oblast, Russian SFSR. His father was Jewish. He is divorced and has two children.

Shargin graduated in 1982 from the Military Engineering Academy for Aeronautics and Astronautics located in Leningrad. He is a lieutenant colonel in the Russian Space Forces.

He was selected as a cosmonaut on February 9, 1996.

He was selected in 2004, to be the flight engineer on the Soyuz TMA-5 mission to the International Space Station. Soyuz TMA-5 was successfully launched on October 14, 2004.

Shargin was the first Russian Space Forces cosmonaut to launch into space. Due to his late addition to the crew and lack of background information or information about his activities in space, some questioned the motives of his flight. However, chief flight director Vladimir Solovyov, assured, “We, on the ISS, are not involved in military matters.”

After nearly 10 days in space, he returned to Earth on board Soyuz TMA-4

He retired from the cosmonaut corps in August 2008

== See also ==
- List of Heroes of the Russian Federation
