= Aleksandr Kaleri =

Russian cosmonaut (born 1956)

- Александр Калери
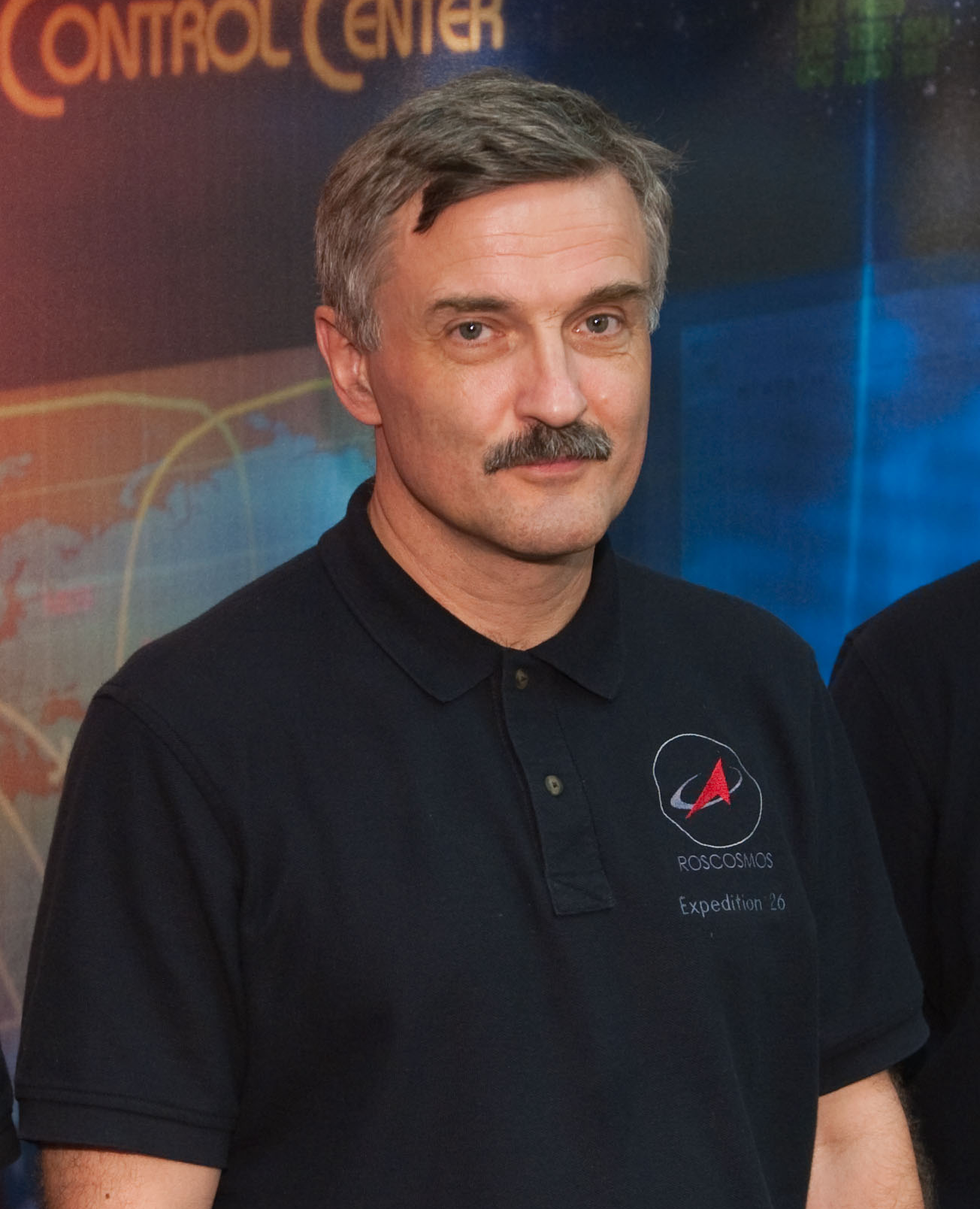
- Kaleri in 2010
- Born: 13 May 1956 (age 70); Jūrmala, Latvian SSR (now Latvia)
- Education: Moscow Institute of Physics and Technology
- Occupation: Flight engineer
- Awards: Hero of Russian Federation
- Space career

Roscosmos cosmonaut
- Status: Retired
- Time in space: 769d 6h 37min
- Selection: 1984 Cosmonaut Group
- Total EVAs: 5
- Total EVA time: 25 hours 46 minutes
- Mission: Soyuz TM-14 (Mir EO-11), Soyuz TM-24 (Mir EO-22), Soyuz TM-30 (Mir EO-28), Soyuz TMA-3 (Expedition 8), Soyuz TMA-01M (Expedition 25/26)
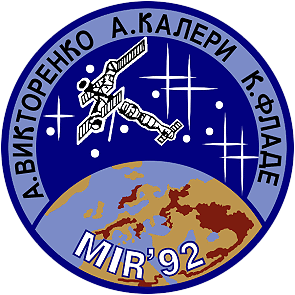
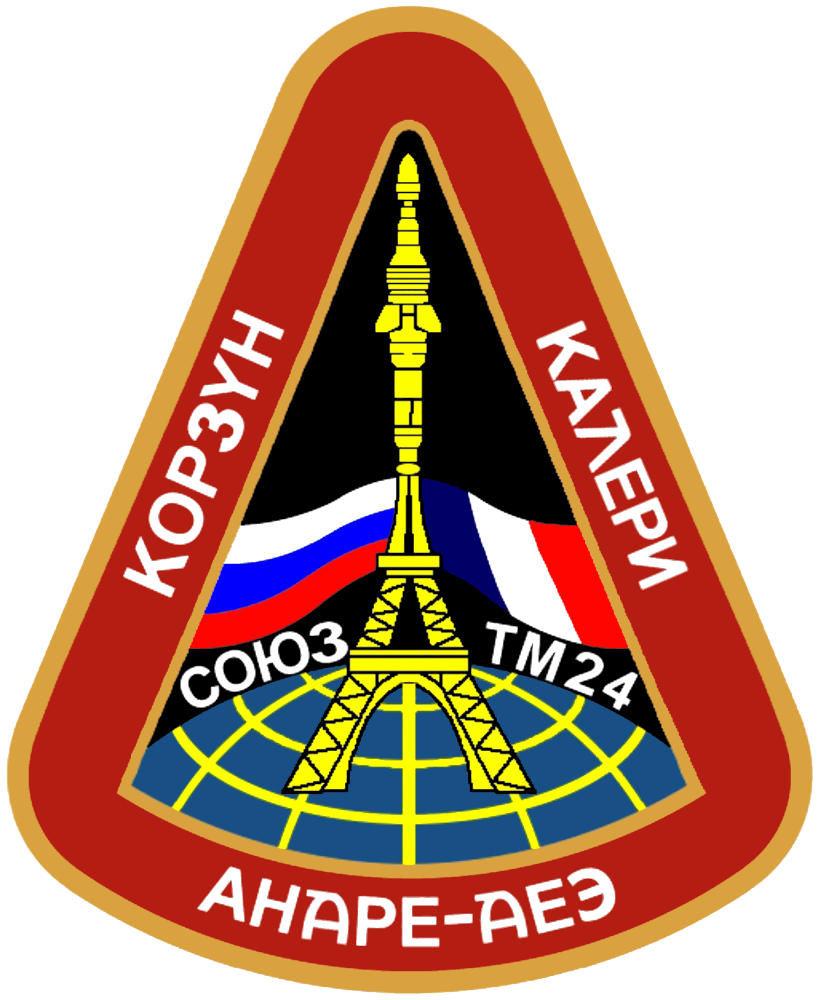
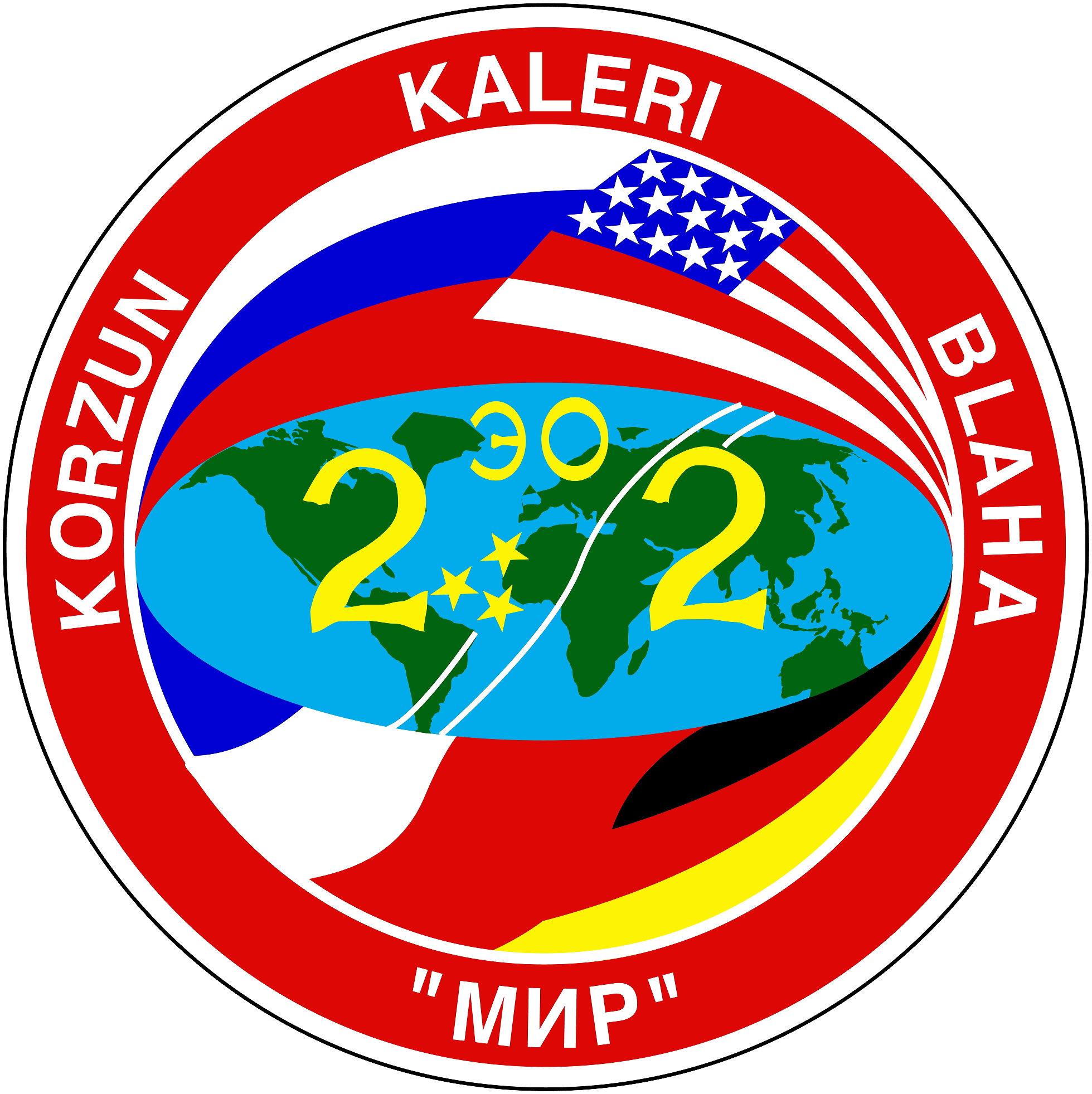
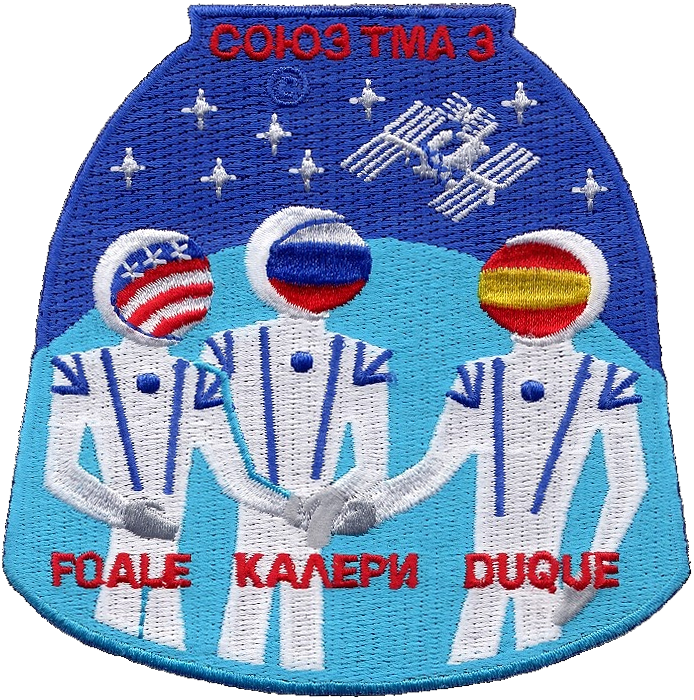
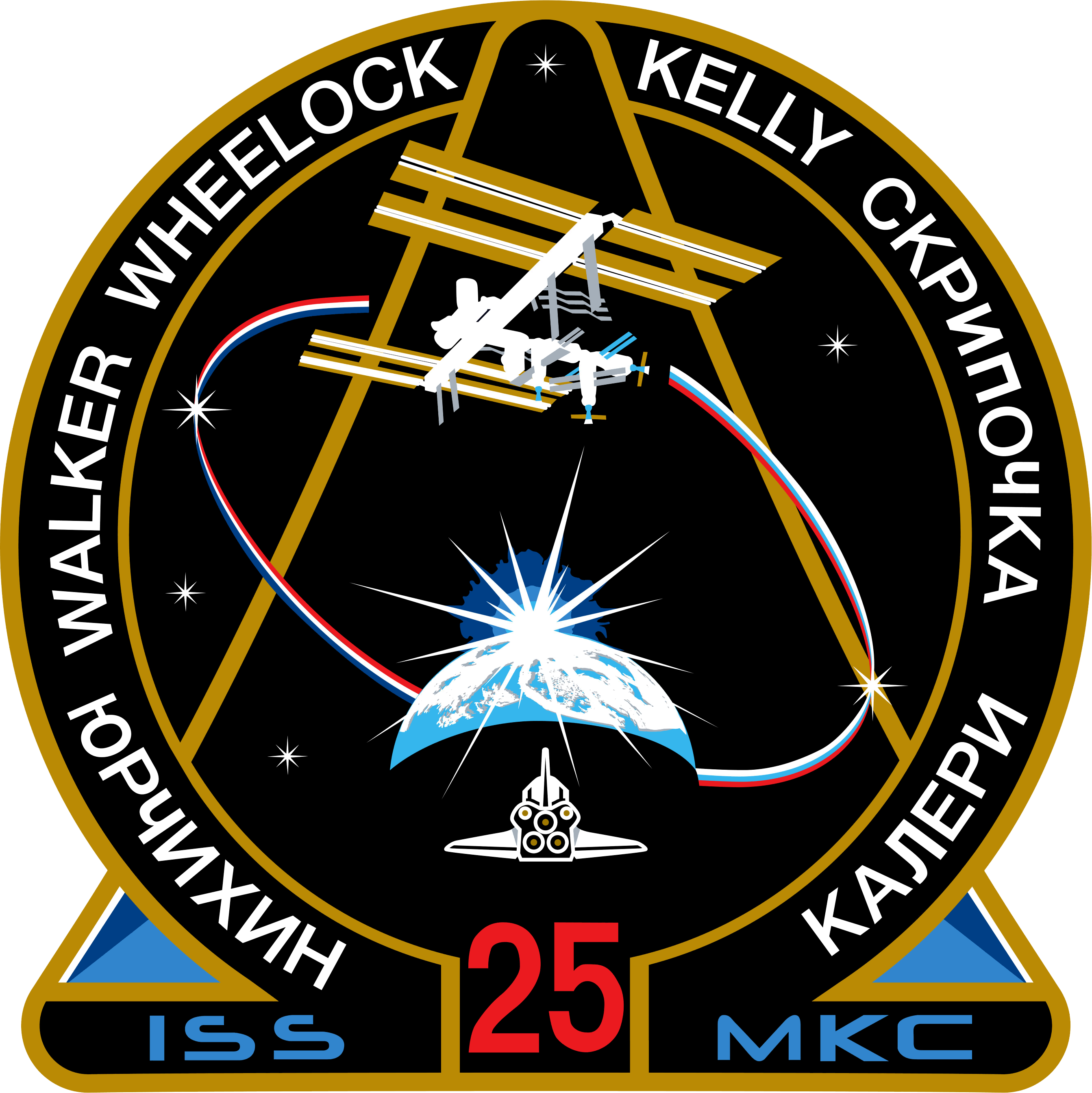
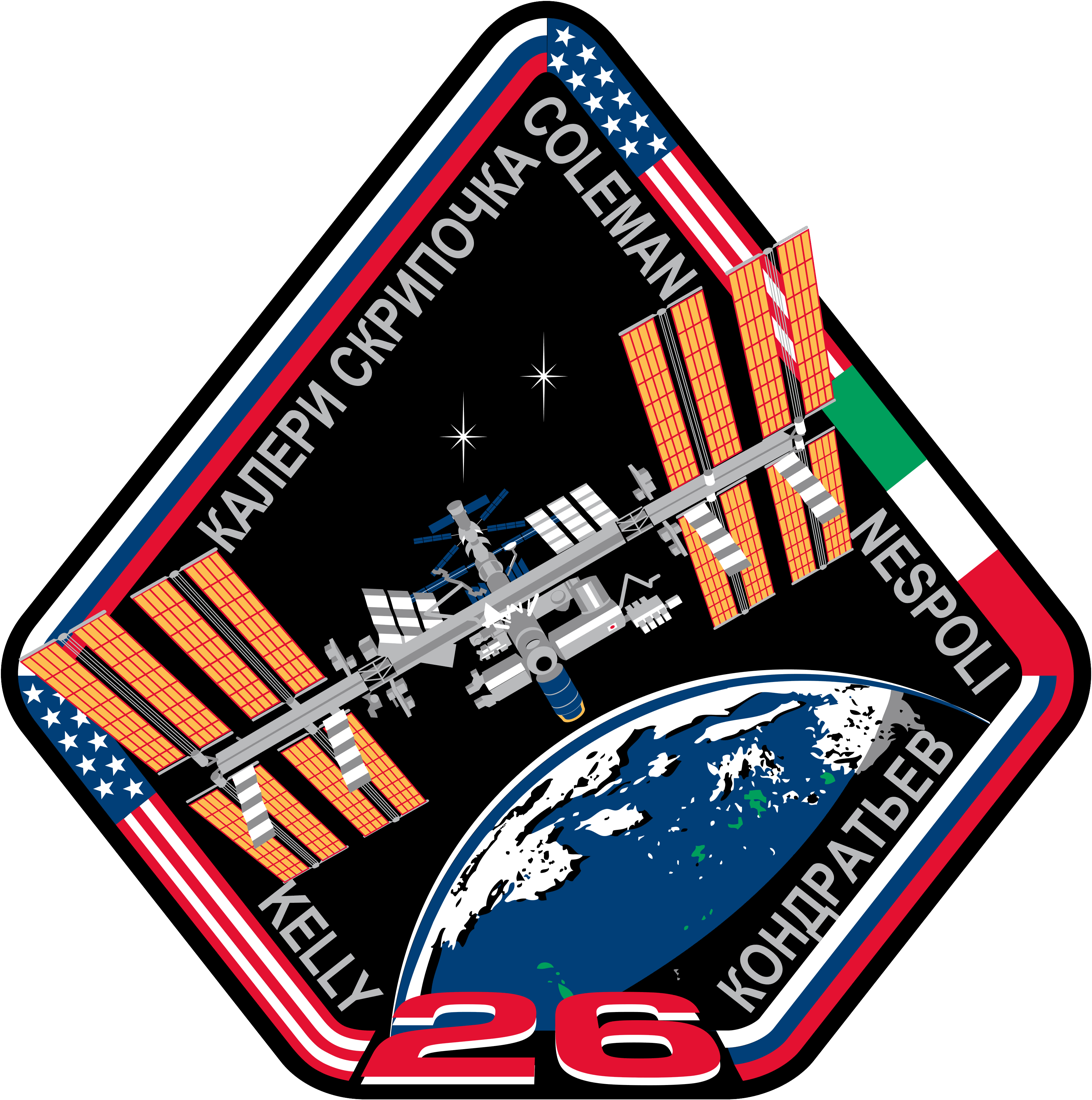
- Mission insignia
- Retired: April 16, 2022

Aleksandr "Sasha" Yuriyevich Kaleri (Russian: Александр Юрьевич Калери; born 13 May 1956 in Jūrmala, Latvia) is a former Russian cosmonaut and veteran of extended stays on the Mir Space Station and the International Space Station (ISS). Kaleri has most recently been in space in 2010 and 2011 aboard the ISS serving as a flight engineer for the long duration Expedition 25/26 missions. He has spent the fifth-longest time in space of any person, and the longest time in space of any person not born in what is now Russia.

== Personal ==
Kaleri is married to Svetlana L. Nosova. They have a son, Oleg Aleksandrovich Kaleri, born in 1996. Kaleri's mother, Antonina Petrovna Kaleri, resides in Sevastopol, Crimea, and his father, Yuri Borisovich Kaleri, is deceased. Kaleri enjoys running, reading and gardening.

== Education ==
In 1979, Kaleri graduated from the Moscow Institute of Physics and Technology, Dolgoprudny, Moscow region, as a specialist in Aircraft Flight Dynamics and Control. In 1983, he completed post-graduate studies at the same institute as a specialist in the field of Mechanics of Fluids and Plasma.

== Experience ==
In 1979, he was hired by the Energia Corporation and worked on the Mir space station. He participated in development of design and engineering documentation, full-scale tests of the Mir. Kaleri is a skilled programmer.

== Cosmonaut career ==
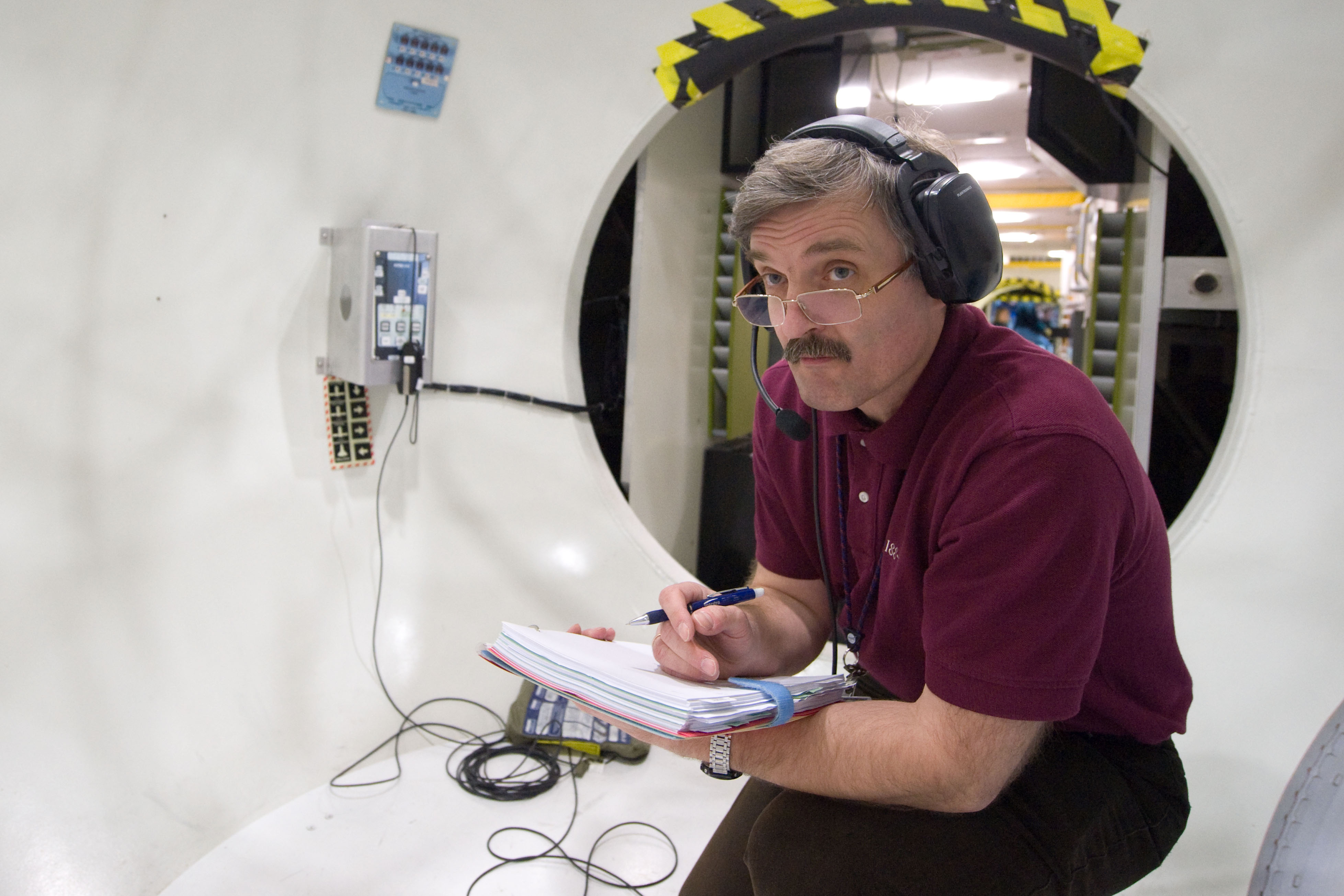
Kaleri participates in a training session at NASA's Lyndon B. Johnson Space Center.

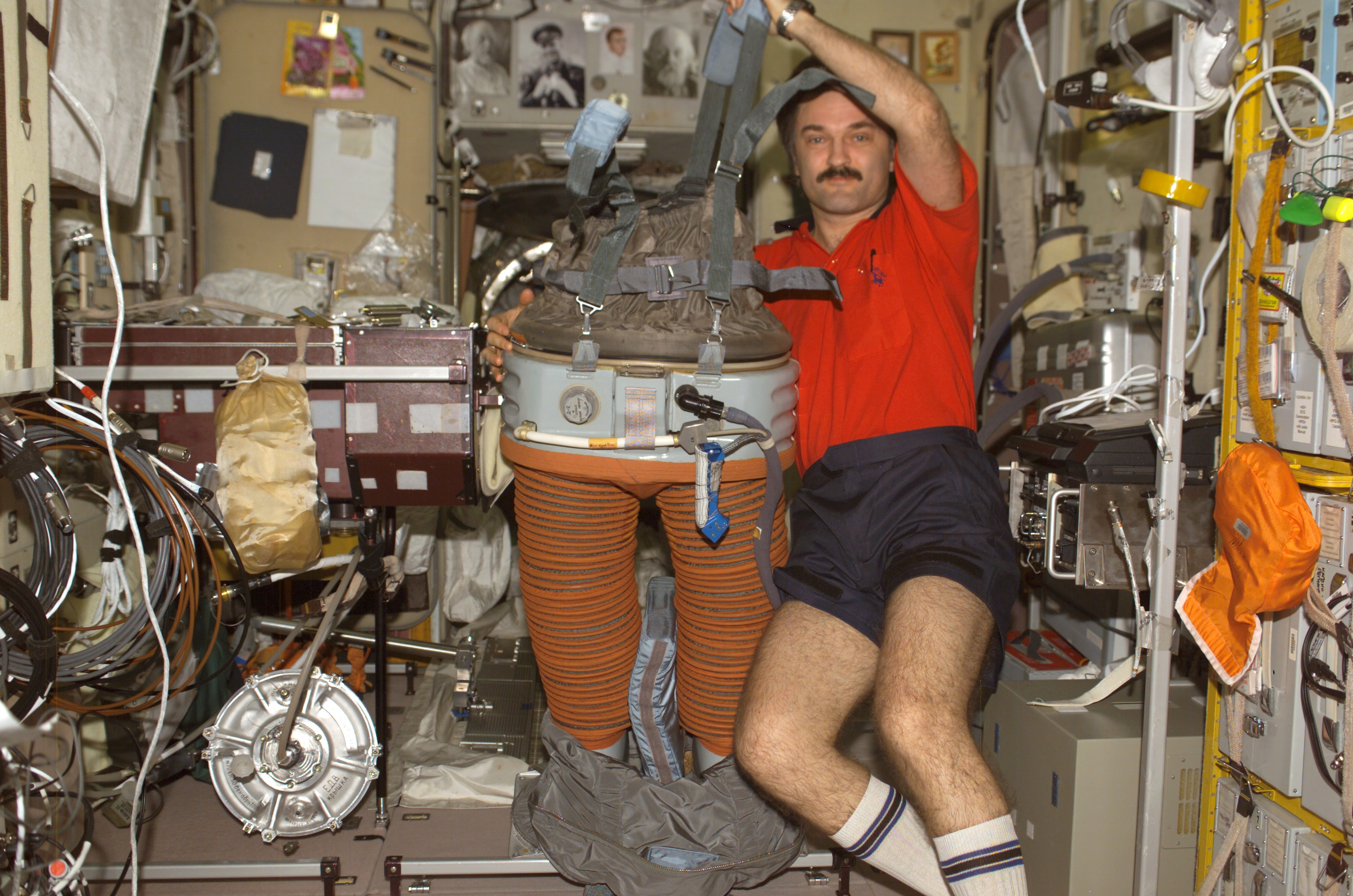
Kaleri inside the Zvezda service module during Expedition 8.

Kaleri was selected as the Energia RSC cosmonaut candidate in April 1984. Between 1985 and 1986, he completed basic training and evaluation at the Gagarin Cosmonaut Training Center. In 1987 he was qualified for flight assignment as a test cosmonaut.

Kaleri took a training course for a spaceflight aboard the Mir orbital station as a backup crew flight engineer of the Mir-3 mission from 1 April to 9 December 1987. He took a training course for a spaceflight aboard the Mir as a backup crew flight engineer of the Mir-9 mission from January to April 1991. From 8 October 1991 to 25 February 1992, Kaleri was training as a primary crew flight engineer for the Mir-11 mission.

Kaleri has participated in three extended missions aboard the Mir Space Station. In 1992, he participated in a 145-day flight aboard the Soyuz-TM-14 spacecraft and the Mir. Between 17 August 1996 to 2 March 1997, Kaleri spent 197-days in space aboard the Soyuz-TM-24 spacecraft and the Mir as the Mir-22 mission flight engineer. In 2000, Kaleri performed his third spaceflight aboard the Soyuz-TM-30 spacecraft and the Mir as the Mir-28 mission flight engineer.

=== Expedition 8 ===
In 2003, he first flew to the International Space Station (ISS) with NASA astronaut Michael Foale on his fourth spaceflight. Kaleri served as a Flight Engineer on Expedition 8 and spent 194 days in space from 18 October 2003 to 30 April 2004. The Soyuz TMA-3 spacecraft carrying Kaleri, Foale and ESA astronaut André Kuipers successfully landed in Kazakhstan at 00:11 GMT on 30 April 2004. The landing site was located some 60 kilometers northeast of the town of Arkalyk.

=== Expedition 25/26 ===
Kaleri was a member (Flight Engineer) of the ISS Expedition 25/26, that was launched on 7 October 2010 from Baikonur Cosmodrome, aboard Soyuz TMA-01M spacecraft, together with cosmonaut Oleg Skripochka and NASA astronaut Scott Kelly. He served as the Soyuz commander. The mission marked Kaleri's fifth flight into space. He arrived at the ISS after the Soyuz spacecraft linked up with the space station at 00:01 UTC on 10 October 2010. He remained in the ISS till March 2011. During their mission, Kaleri and the rest of the Expedition 25/26 crew participated in a wide array of research, including fundamental physics, biometric experiments and investigations of crystal growth in space, as well as education outreach.

=== Spacewalks ===
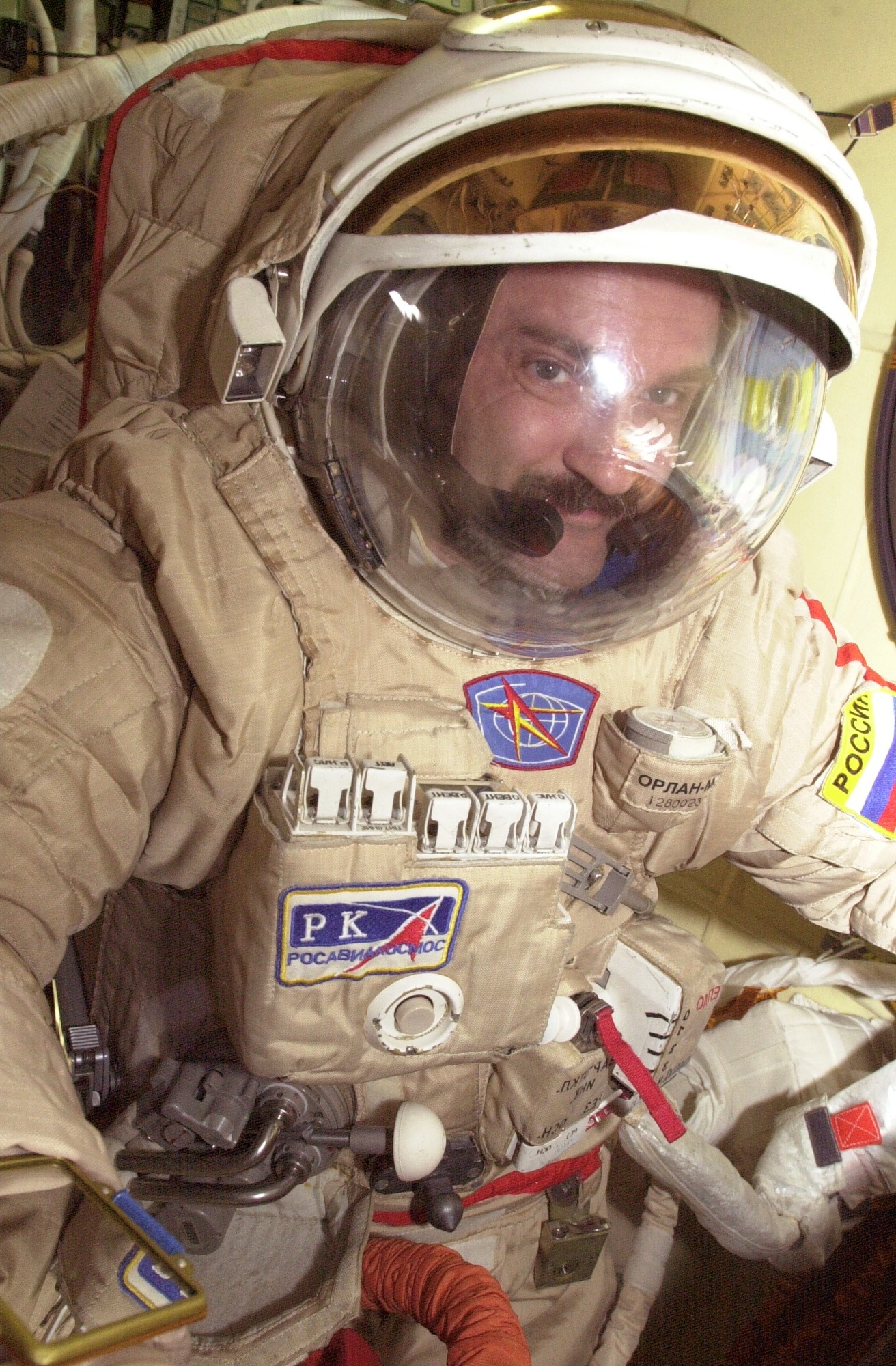
Aleksandr Kaleri wearing an Orlan spacesuit is pictured in the Pirs Docking Compartment.

Kaleri has participated in five spacewalks and has accumulated 23 EVA hours.

On 8 July 1992, at 12:38 UTC Kaleri started his first career spacewalk. During the spacewalk, he and cosmonaut Aleksandr Viktorenko inspected some of Mir's gyrodynes. The spacewalk lasted 2 hours and 3 minutes.

On 2 December 1996, Kaleri and fellow cosmonaut Valery Korzun completed a 5 hours 57 minutes long spacewalk. The main purpose was to complete connections of the cooperative solar array to provide more electrical power to the Mir station. The spacewalk was Kaleri's second career spacewalk.

On 9 December 1996, Kaleri and fellow cosmonaut Valery Korzun completed a 6 hours 36 minutes long spacewalk. The spacewalk began at 13:50 UTC and ended at 20:28 UTC. During the spacewalk, the two cosmonauts completed connecting the solar array and attached a new Kurs docking antenna subsequently used to guide Progress vehicles docking with Mir. They also repaired the transceiver system that the Mir crew used to talk to amateur operators all around the world.

On 12 May 2000, Kaleri and fellow cosmonaut Sergei Zalyotin completed a five-hour spacewalk to inspect the exterior of Mir. The two spacewalkers also tested a glue which would have been useful to seal tiny cracks, and applied the new airtight sealant to a special panel imitating a damaged section in Mir's skin. The two cosmonauts also examined the exterior of the Progress M1-2 cargo spacecraft.

On 26 February 2004, Kaleri and NASA astronaut Michael Foale floated outside the ISS from the Pirs Docking Compartment airlock. The spacewalk began at 4:17 EST, and Foale and Kaleri were able to complete all but two of their planned tasks, swapping out experiment packages and mounting an instrumented dummy torso on the station's hull to measure the radiation environment faced by spacewalking astronauts. Although the spacewalk was originally planned for 5 hours and 30 minutes, it was cut short due to a cooling system malfunction in Kaleri's spacesuit. Kaleri reported seeing drops of water on the inside of his spacesuit's visor. The spacewalk lasted 3 hours and 55 minutes. The excursion was the fifth career spacewalk for Kaleri.

== Honours and awards ==
- Hero of the Russian Federation (11 August 1992) - for the successful implementation of long-duration space flight on the orbital station Mir and displaying courage and heroism
- Order of Merit for the Fatherland;
  - 2nd class (9 November 2000) - for courage and heroism displayed during spaceflight on the orbital scientific research complex Mir
  - 3rd class (11 April 1997) - for courage and heroism displayed during prolonged space flight 22nd major expedition to the orbital scientific research complex Mir
  - 4th class (12 April 2011) - for courage and professionalism shown during the implementation of long-duration space flight on the International Space Station
- Order of Friendship (31 October 2005) - for dedication and professionalism shown during the implementation of the 195-day space flight, and the strengthening of friendship between peoples
- Medal "For Merit in Space Exploration"
- NASA Space Flight Medal
- NASA Distinguished Public Service Medal
- Chevalier of the Legion of Honour (France, 1997)
- Pilot-Cosmonaut of the Russian Federation (11 August 1992) - for the successful implementation of spaceflight on the space station Mir and expressed at high level of professionalism

Qualifications

Logged 22 flight hours on the L-39 training aircraft. Completed 14 parachute jumps. Cosmonaut, 3rd class (24 August 1992); Cosmonaut, 2nd class (1 April 1997); Cosmonaut, 1st class.

Sporting Achievements

Holds the 2nd sports category in trampoline jumping.

== See also ==
- List of Heroes of the Russian Federation
