= Soyuz TMA-4 =

2004 Russian crewed spaceflight to the ISS

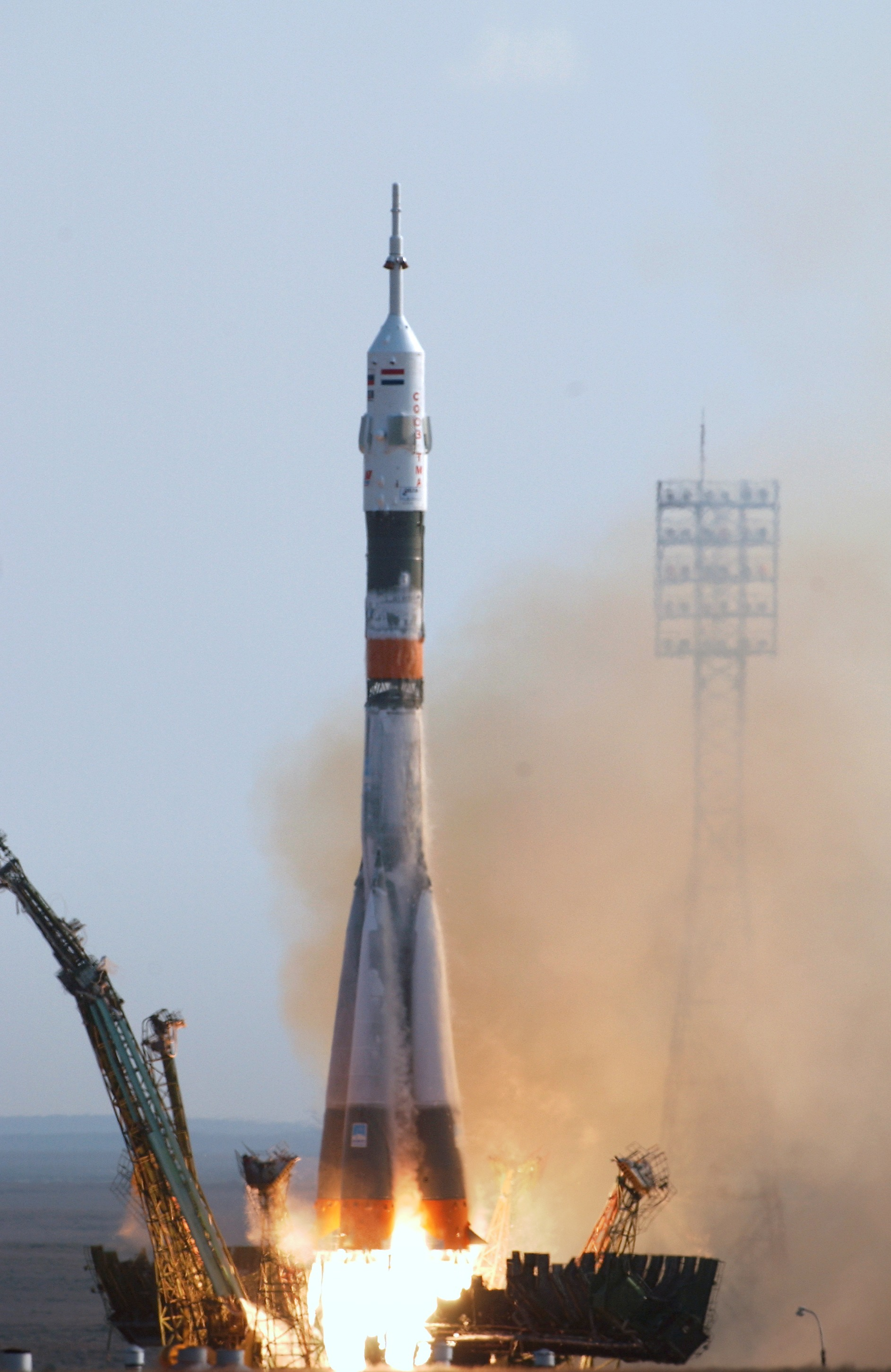
- Mission type: ISS crew transport
- Operator: Roscosmos
- COSPAR ID: 2004-013A
- SATCAT no.: 28228
- Mission duration: 187 days, 21 hours, 16 minutes
- Orbits completed: ~2,950

Spacecraft properties
- Spacecraft: Soyuz-TMA 11F732
- Spacecraft type: Soyuz-TMA
- Manufacturer: Energia

Crew
- Crew size: 3
- Members: Gennady Padalka; Michael Fincke
- Launching: André Kuipers
- Landing: Yuri Shargin
- Callsign: Altair

Start of mission
- Launch date: 19 April 2004, 03:19:00 UTC
- Rocket: Soyuz-FG
- Launch site: Baikonur, Site 1/5
- Contractor: Progress

End of mission
- Landing date: 24 October 2004, 00:35:00 UTC
- Landing site: 90 km (56 mi) north of Arkalyk

Orbital parameters
- Reference system: Geocentric
- Regime: Low Earth
- Perigee altitude: 200 km (120 mi)
- Apogee altitude: 252 km (157 mi)
- Inclination: 51.7 degrees
- Period: 88.7 minutes

Docking with ISS
- Docking port: Zarya nadir
- Docking date: 21 April 2004; 05:01 UTC
- Undocking date: 23 October 2004; 21:08 UTC
- Time docked: 185d 16h 7m
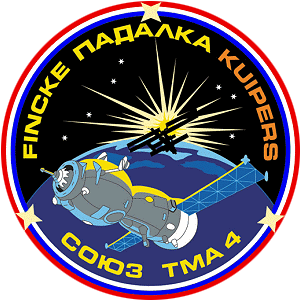
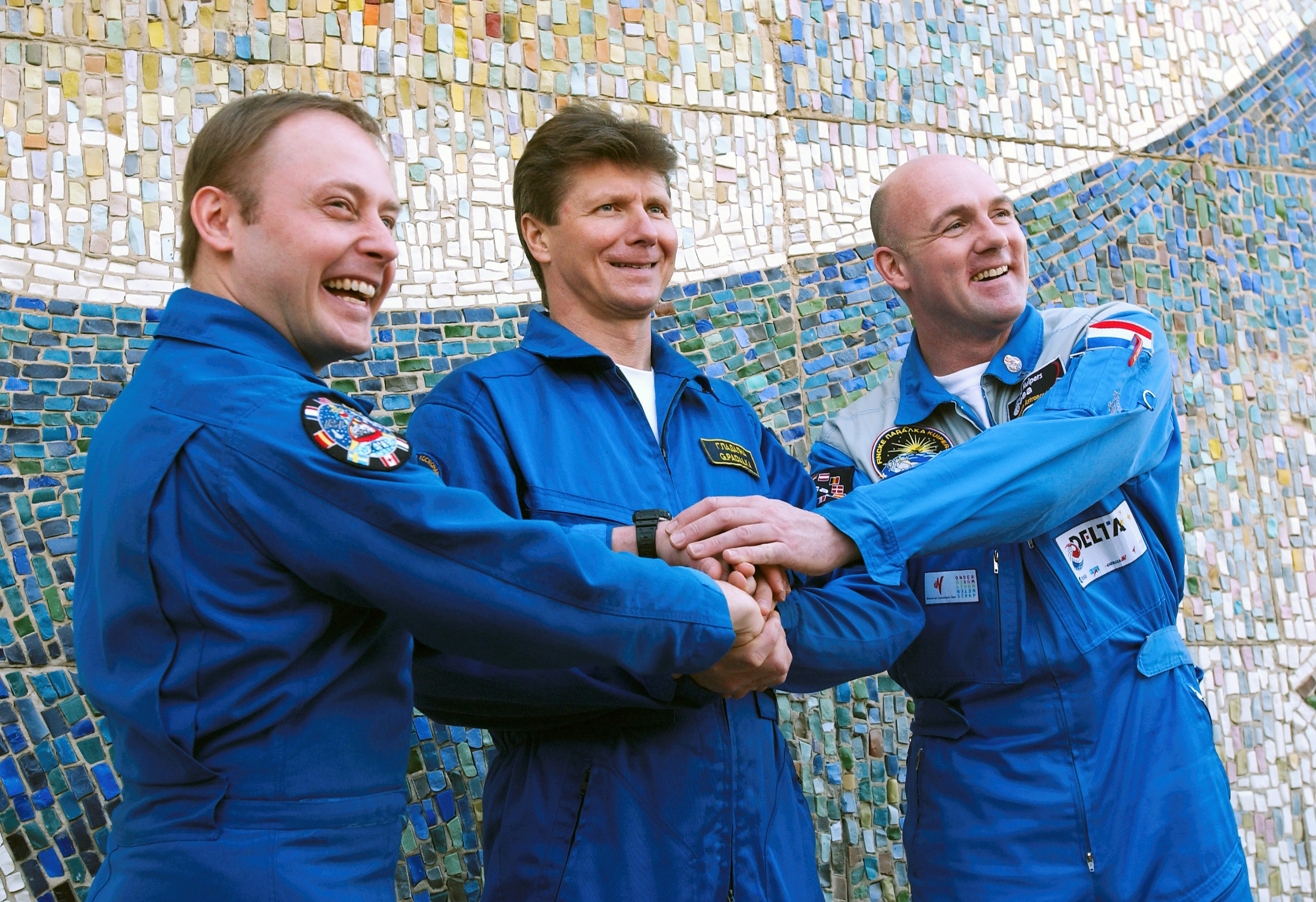
- From left to right: Michael Fincke, Gennady Padalka and André Kuipers Soyuz programme (Crewed missions)

Soyuz TMA-4 was a Soyuz mission to the International Space Station (ISS) launched by a Soyuz FG launch vehicle. It was launched on 19 April 2004 (UTC) from Baikonur Cosmodrome. Gennady Padalka from Russia, Michael Fincke from the US and André Kuipers from the Netherlands were flown to the International Space Station. Kuipers returned to Earth 9 days later together with ISS crew 8 with the re-entry module of the Soyuz TMA-3, the other two stayed as ISS crew 9. The craft landed 24 October 2004 with Padalka, Fincke and Yuri Shargin aboard.

== Crew ==
Position	Launching crew	Landing crew
Commander	(Russia) Gennady Padalka, Roscosmos; Expedition 9 Second spaceflight	
Flight Engineer	(United States) Michael Fincke, NASA; Expedition 9 First spaceflight	
Flight Engineer	(Netherlands) André Kuipers, ESA; First spaceflight	(Russia) Yuri Shargin, Roscosmos; Only spaceflight

== Original Crew ==
Position	Crew
Commander	(Kazakhstan) Talgat Musabayev, Roscosmos; N/A (Taxi Flight); Fourth spaceflight
Flight Engineer	(Germany) Hans Schlegel, ESA; N/A (Taxi Flight); Second spaceflight
Flight Engineer or Spaceflight Participant	Spaceflight Participant or Russian Cosmonaut; N/A (Taxi Flight); First spaceflight

== Mission parameters ==
- Mass: ? kg
- Perigee: 200 km
- Apogee: 252 km
- Inclination: 51.7°
- Period: 88.7 minutes

=== Docking with ISS ===
- Docked to ISS: 21 April 2004, 05:01 UTC (to nadir port of Zarya)
- Undocked from ISS: 23 October 2004, 21:08 UTC (from nadir port of Zarya)

== Mission highlights ==
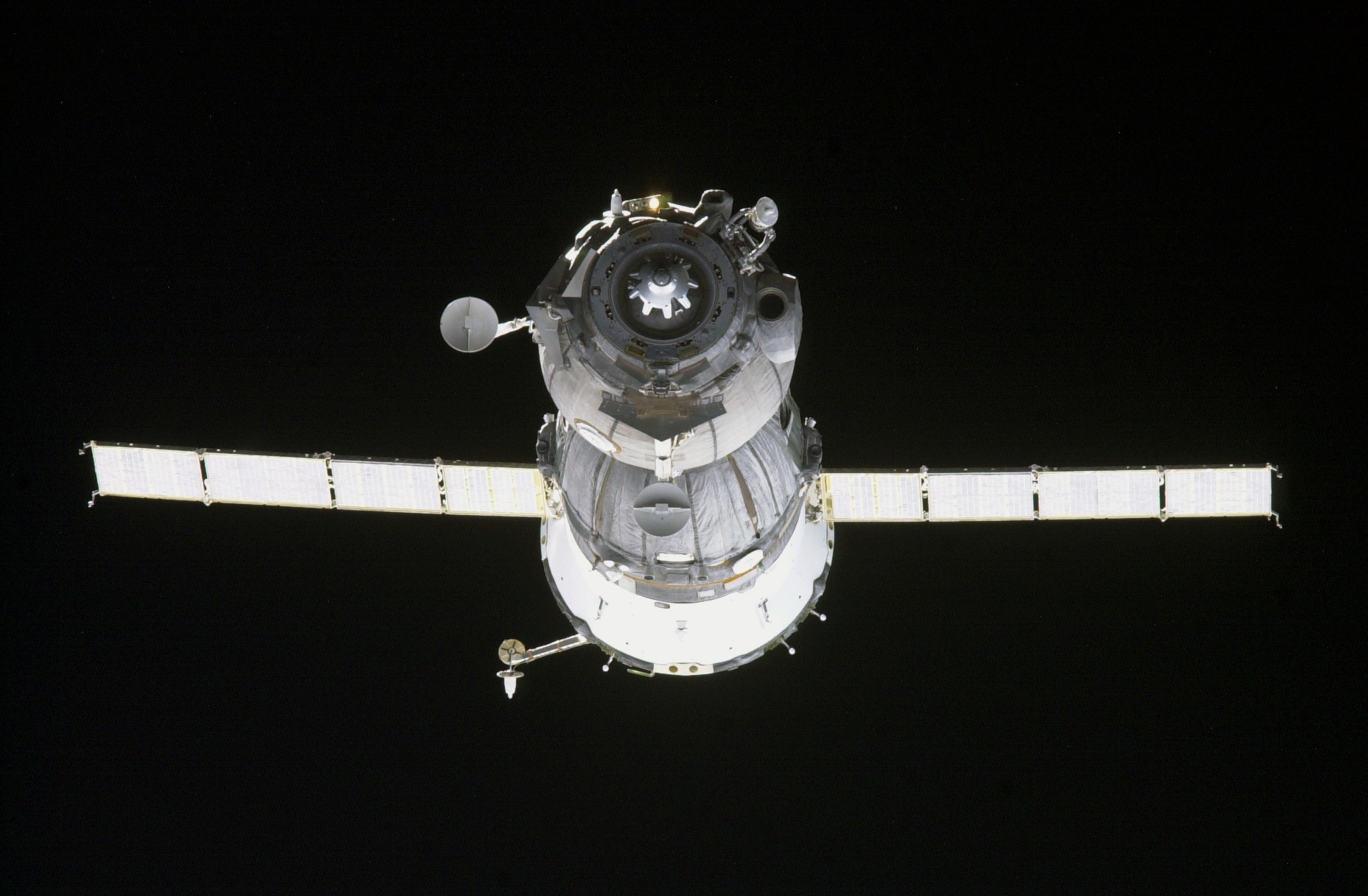
Soyuz TMA-4 spacecraft approaches the ISS.

Soyuz TMA-4 is a Russian passenger spacecraft that was launched by a Soyuz-FG rocket from Baikonur at 03:19 UT on 19 April 2004. It carried three astronauts (a Russian, an American and a Dutchman) to the International Space Station (ISS) and docked with the Zarya module of the ISS automatically on 21 April at 05:01 UT. Two of its astronauts remained in the ISS for about six months, while the Dutch astronaut and the two astronauts who had inhabited the ISS for several months left the ISS on 29 April in the TMA-3 that had remained docked with the ISS, soft landing in Kazakhstan at 00:11 on 30 April.

The Expedition 10 crew, Leroy Chiao-Cdr U.S.A. and Salizhan Sharipov-Russia replaced the Expedition 9 crew, Gennady Padalka-Cdr Russia and Michael Fincke-Flight Engineer-U.S.A. on 16 October 2004.

The European segment of the mission was called "DELTA".
