= Soyuz TMA-3 =

2003 Russian crewed spaceflight to the ISS

- Mission type: ISS crew transport
- Operator: Russian Space Agency
- COSPAR ID: 2003-047A
- SATCAT no.: 28052
- Mission duration: 194 days, 18 hours, 33 minutes, 12 seconds
- Orbits completed: ~3,170

Spacecraft properties
- Spacecraft: Soyuz-TMA 11F732
- Spacecraft type: Soyuz-TMA
- Manufacturer: Energia

Crew
- Crew size: 3
- Members: Aleksandr Kaleri; Michael Foale
- Launching: Pedro Duque
- Landing: André Kuipers
- Callsign: Ingul

Start of mission
- Launch date: October 18, 2003, 05:38:03 UTC
- Rocket: Soyuz-FG
- Launch site: Baikonur, Site 1/5
- Contractor: Progress

End of mission
- Landing date: April 30, 2004, 00:11:15 UTC
- Landing site: 50.38° N, 67.20° E

Orbital parameters
- Reference system: Geocentric
- Regime: Low Earth
- Perigee altitude: 193 kilometres (120 mi)
- Apogee altitude: 227 kilometres (141 mi)
- Inclination: 51.67 degrees

Docking with ISS
- Docking port: Pirs nadir
- Docking date: 20 October 2003; 07:16 UTC
- Undocking date: 29 April 2004; 20:52 UTC
- Time docked: 192d 13h 36m
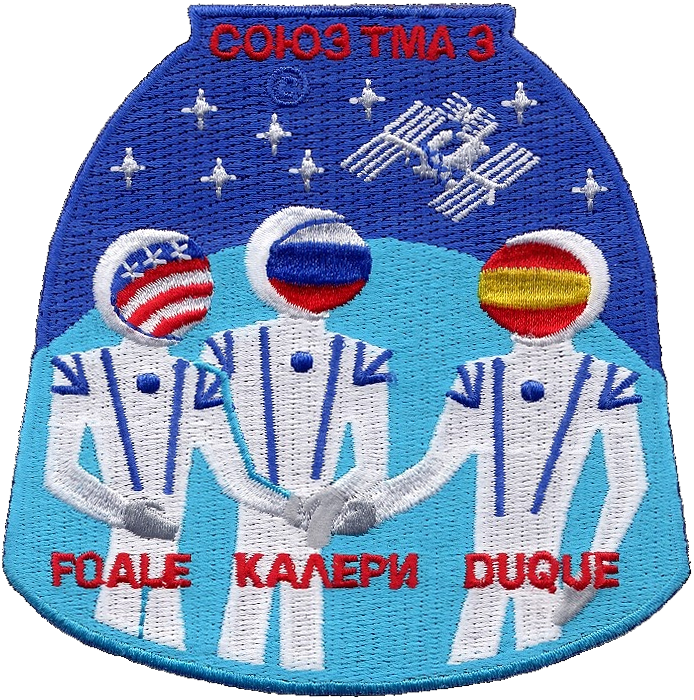
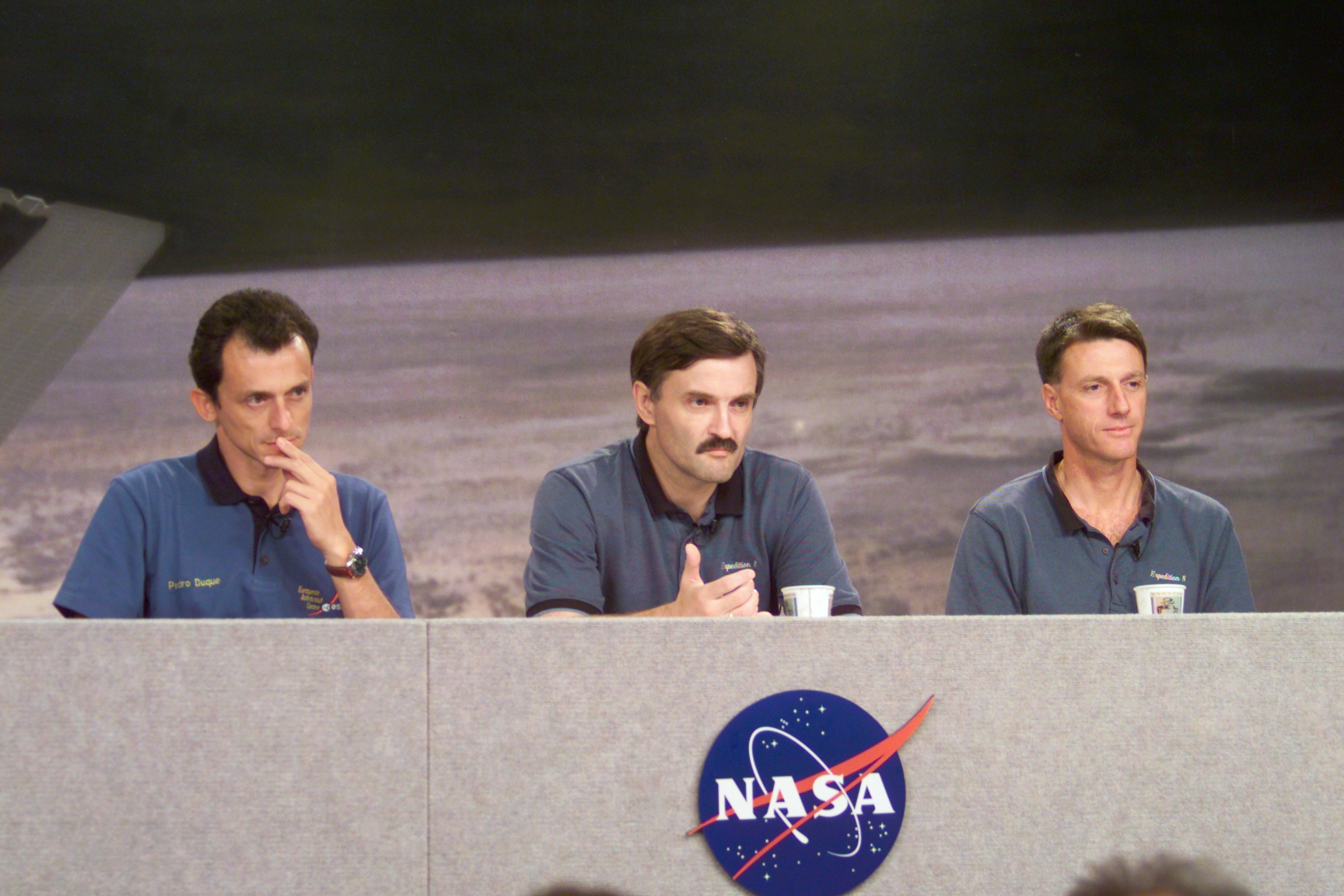
- Soyuz programme (Crewed missions)

Soyuz TMA-3 was a Soyuz (Russian Союз ТМА-3, Union TMA-3) mission to the International Space Station (ISS) launched by a Soyuz FG launch vehicle which was the third flight for the TMA modification of the Soyuz spacecraft, and the 7th Soyuz to fly to the ISS.

== Crew ==
Position	Launching crew	Landing crew
Commander	(Russia) Aleksandr Kaleri, RSA; Expedition 8 Fourth spaceflight	
Flight Engineer	(United States) / (United Kingdom) Michael Foale, NASA; Expedition 8 Sixth and last spaceflight	
Flight Engineer	(Spain) Pedro Duque, ESA; Second and last spaceflight	(Netherlands) André Kuipers, ESA; First spaceflight

== Original Crew ==
Position	Crew
Commander	(Russia) Vladimir Dezhurov, RSA
Flight Engineer	(Netherlands) André Kuipers, ESA
Flight Engineer	(Russia) Oleg Skripochka

== Mission parameters ==
From NASA:

- Mass: ? kg
- Perigee: 376 km
- Apogee: 384 km
- Inclination: 51.6°
- Period: 92.20 min

=== Docking with ISS ===
- Docked to ISS: October 20, 2003, 07:16 UTC (to Pirs module)
- Undocked from ISS: April 29, 2004, 20:52 UTC (from Pirs module)

=== Specifications ===
- Max. altitude - 387.1 km
- Min. altitude - 357.9 km
- Period - 91.7 min
- Inclination - 65.64°

== Mission highlights ==
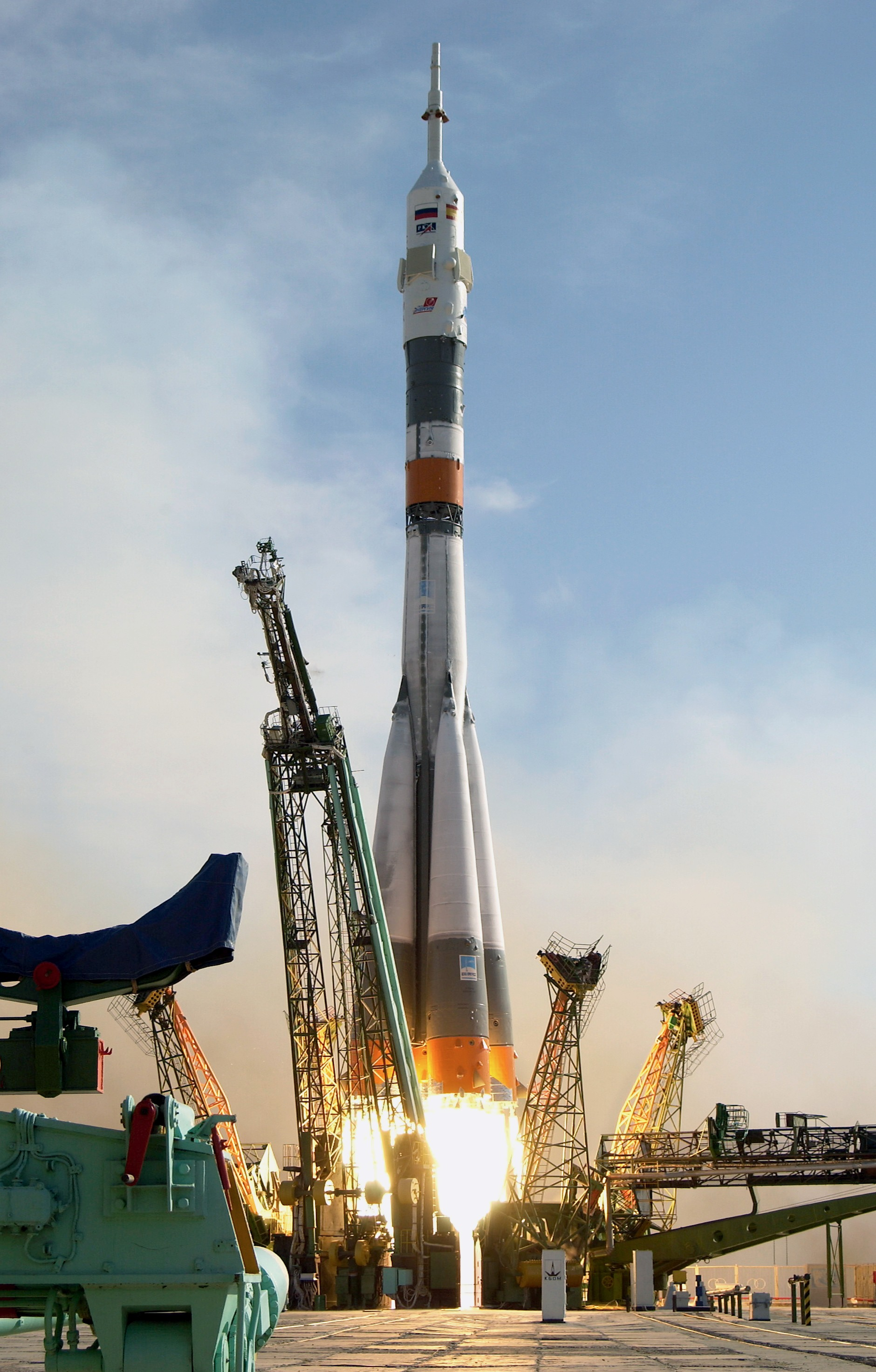
Soyuz TMA-3 launch.

The commander of the Soyuz was Aleksandr Kaleri (RKA). The flight engineer was Michael Foale (NASA), and Pedro Duque (ESA) served as the second flight engineer. After docking with the ISS they exchanged the current crew on ISS and became the eighth station crew, called "ISS Expedition Eight". During the stay on the station Michael Foale was the ISS Commander, while Aleksandr Kaleri was the engineer. Foale was the first American to have served on both Mir and the ISS. Pedro Duque performed ESA sponsored science experiments under the mission name "Cervantes" and then returned with the ISS 7 crew on Soyuz TMA-2.

The backup crew was William McArthur, Valery Tokarev and André Kuipers.

Foale and Kaleri along with André Kuipers, the third seater from TMA-4 landed on April 29, 2004, near Arkalyk, Kazakhstan. A minor helium leak did not affect their mission.
