= Expedition 22 =

22nd expedition to the International Space Station

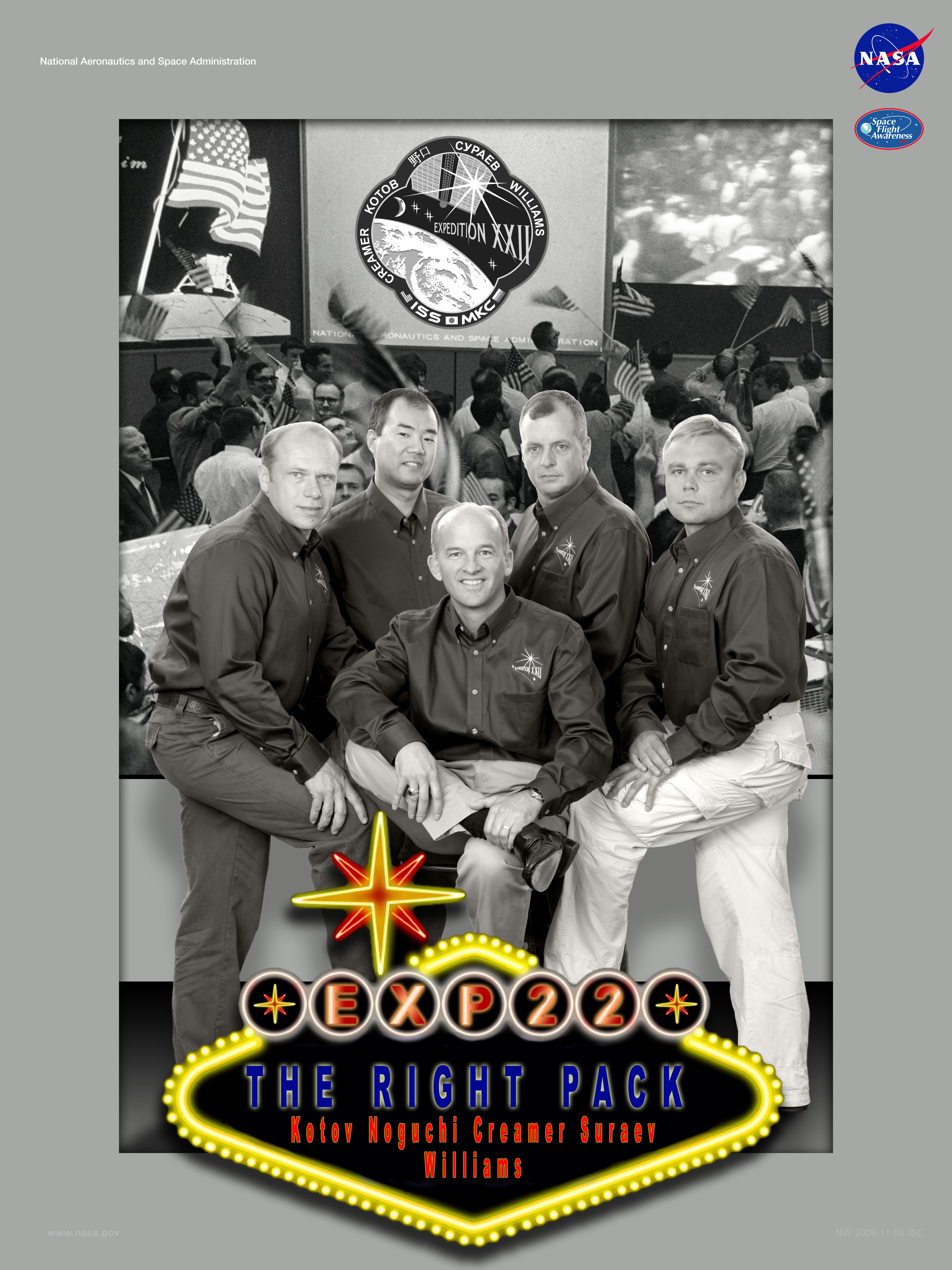
- Promotional Poster
- Mission type: Long-duration expedition
- Mission duration: 167 days (at ISS); 169 days (launch to landing)

Expedition
- Space station: International Space Station
- Began: 1 December 2009
- Ended: 18 March 2010
- Arrived aboard: Soyuz TMA-16; Soyuz TMA-17
- Departed aboard: Soyuz TMA-16; Soyuz TMA-17

Crew
- Crew size: 5
- Members: Expedition 21/22: Jeffrey N. Williams; Maksim Surayev Expedition 22/23: Oleg Kotov; Soichi Noguchi; Timothy Creamer
- EVAs: 1
- EVA duration: 5 hours, 44 minutes
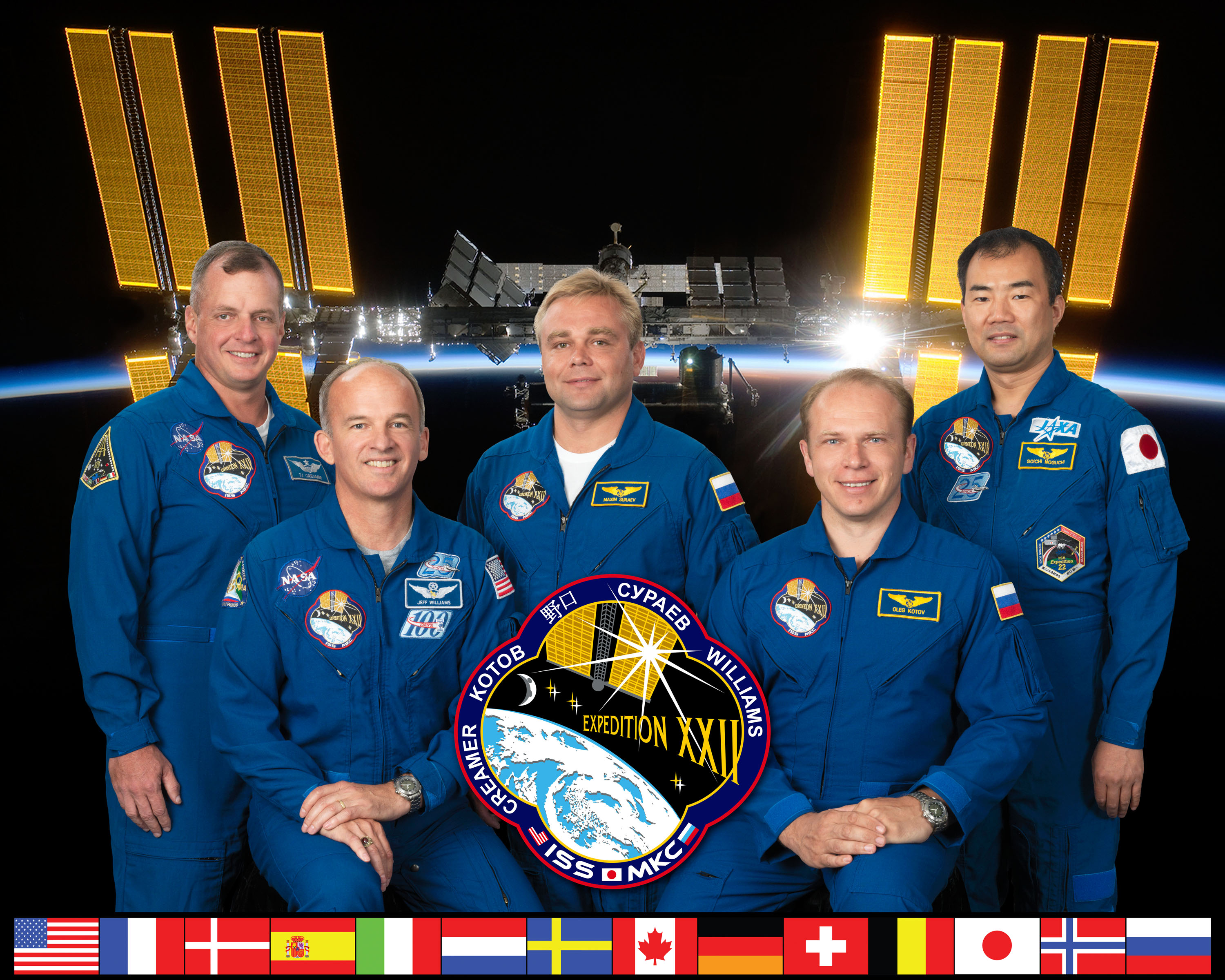
- Expedition 22 mission patch (l-r) Creamer, Williams, Surayev, Kotov and Noguchi ISS expeditions

Expedition 22 was the twenty-second long duration crew flight to the International Space Station (ISS). This expedition began on 1 December 2009 when the Expedition 21 crew departed. For a period of three weeks, there were only two crew members; it was the first time that had occurred since STS-114. Commander Jeff Williams and flight engineer Maksim Surayev were joined by the rest of their crew on 22 December 2009, making the Expedition 22 a crew of five.

The expedition had ended when Soyuz TMA-16 undocked on 18 March 2010, and was immediately followed by the start of Expedition 23.

== Crew ==
| Position | First Part (1 – 22 December 2009) | Second Part (22 December 2009 – 18 March 2010) |
|---|---|---|
| Commander | Jeffrey N. Williams, NASA; Third spaceflight | |
| Flight Engineer 1 | Maksim Surayev, RSA; First spaceflight | |
| Flight Engineer 2 | | Oleg Kotov, RSA; Second spaceflight |
| Flight Engineer 3 | | Soichi Noguchi, JAXA; Second spaceflight |
| Flight Engineer 4 | | Timothy Creamer, NASA; Only spaceflight |

=== Backup crew ===
- Shannon Walker – Commander
- Aleksandr Skvortsov
- Douglas H. Wheelock
- Anton Shkaplerov
- Satoshi Furukawa

== Spacewalks ==
| EVA | Spacewalkers | Start (UTC) | End (UTC) | Duration |
|---|---|---|---|---|
| EVA 1 | Oleg Kotov; Maksim Surayev | 14 January 2010; 10:05 | 14 January 2010; 15:49 | 5 hours, 44 minutes |
| EVA 1 | Prepared the Poisk module for future dockings. Spacewalk was performed using Orlan spacesuits. | | | |

== Gallery ==
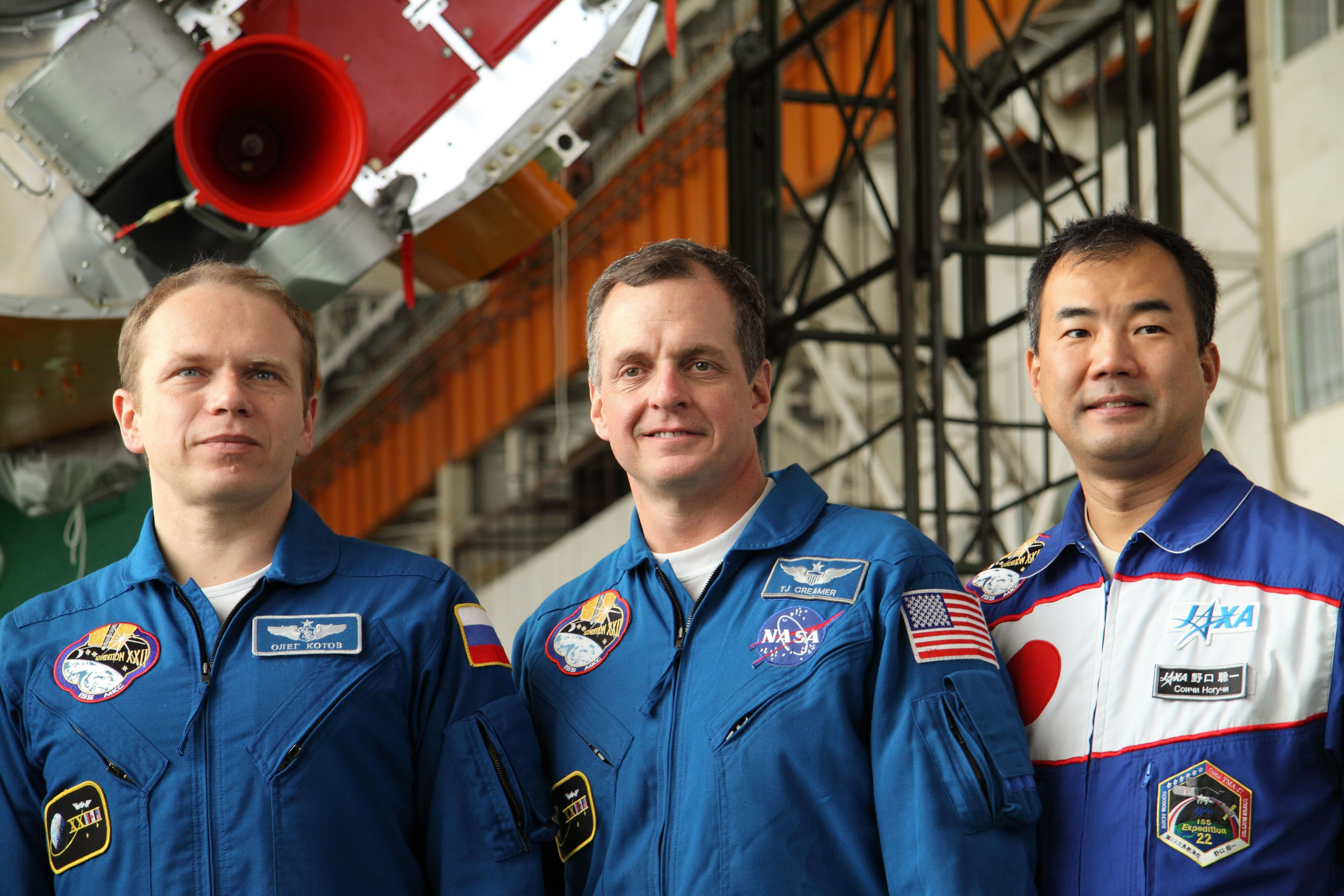
Kotov, Creamer and Noguchi.

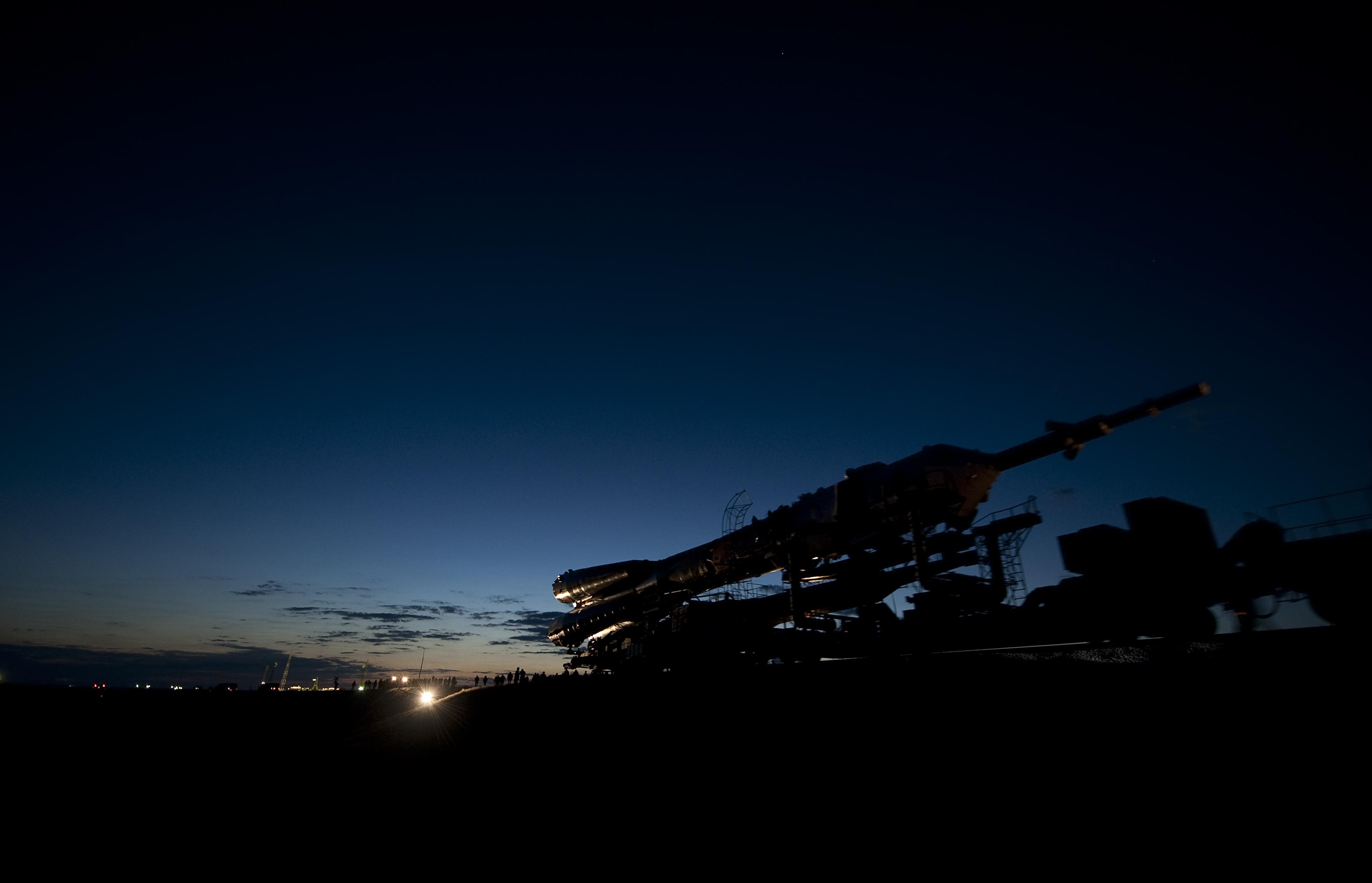
The Soyuz TMA-17 spacecraft is rolled out by train to the launch pad at the Baikonur Cosmodrome, Kazakhstan.

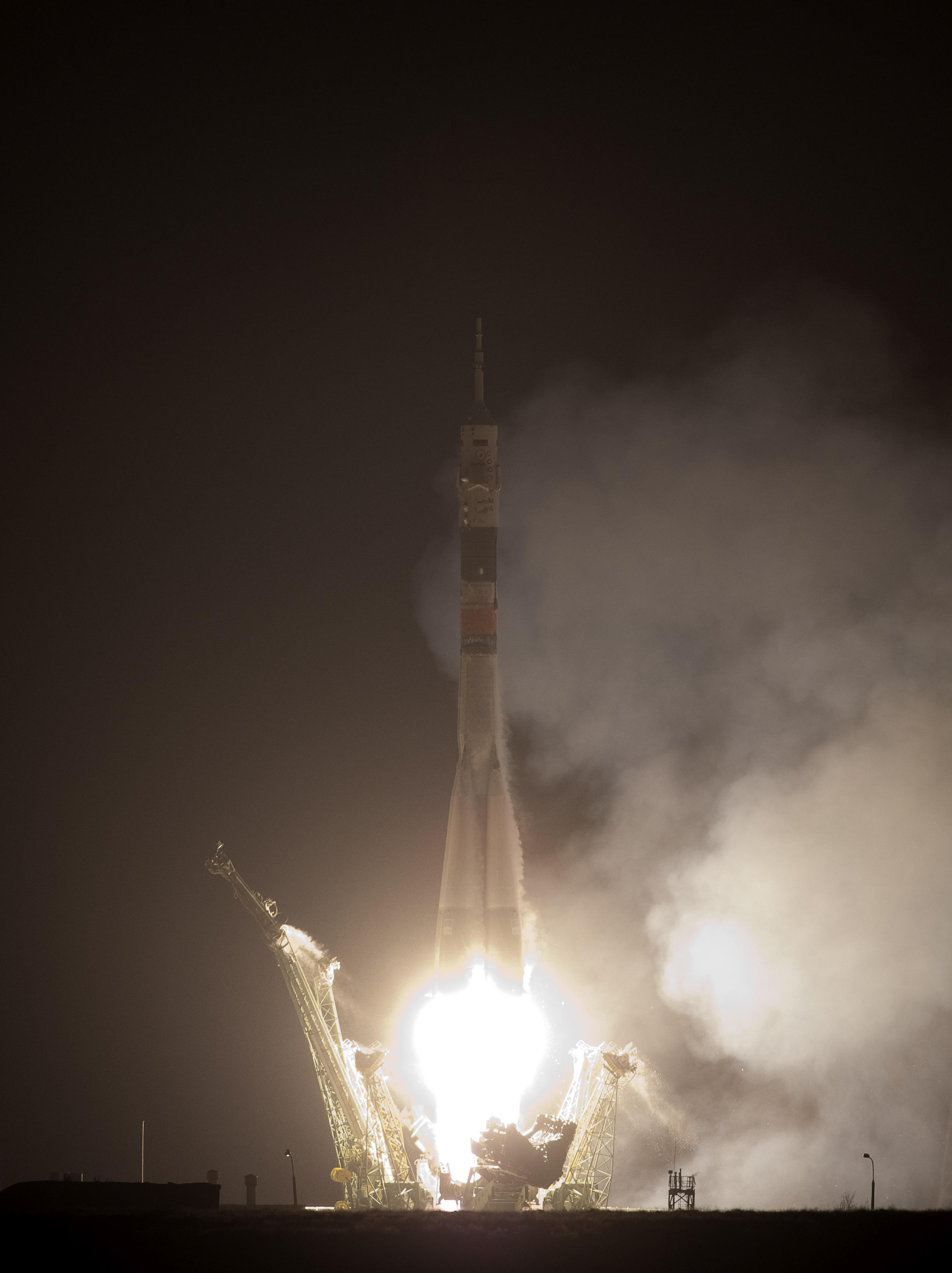
The Soyuz TMA-17 rocket lifts off headed for the ISS on Expedition 22.

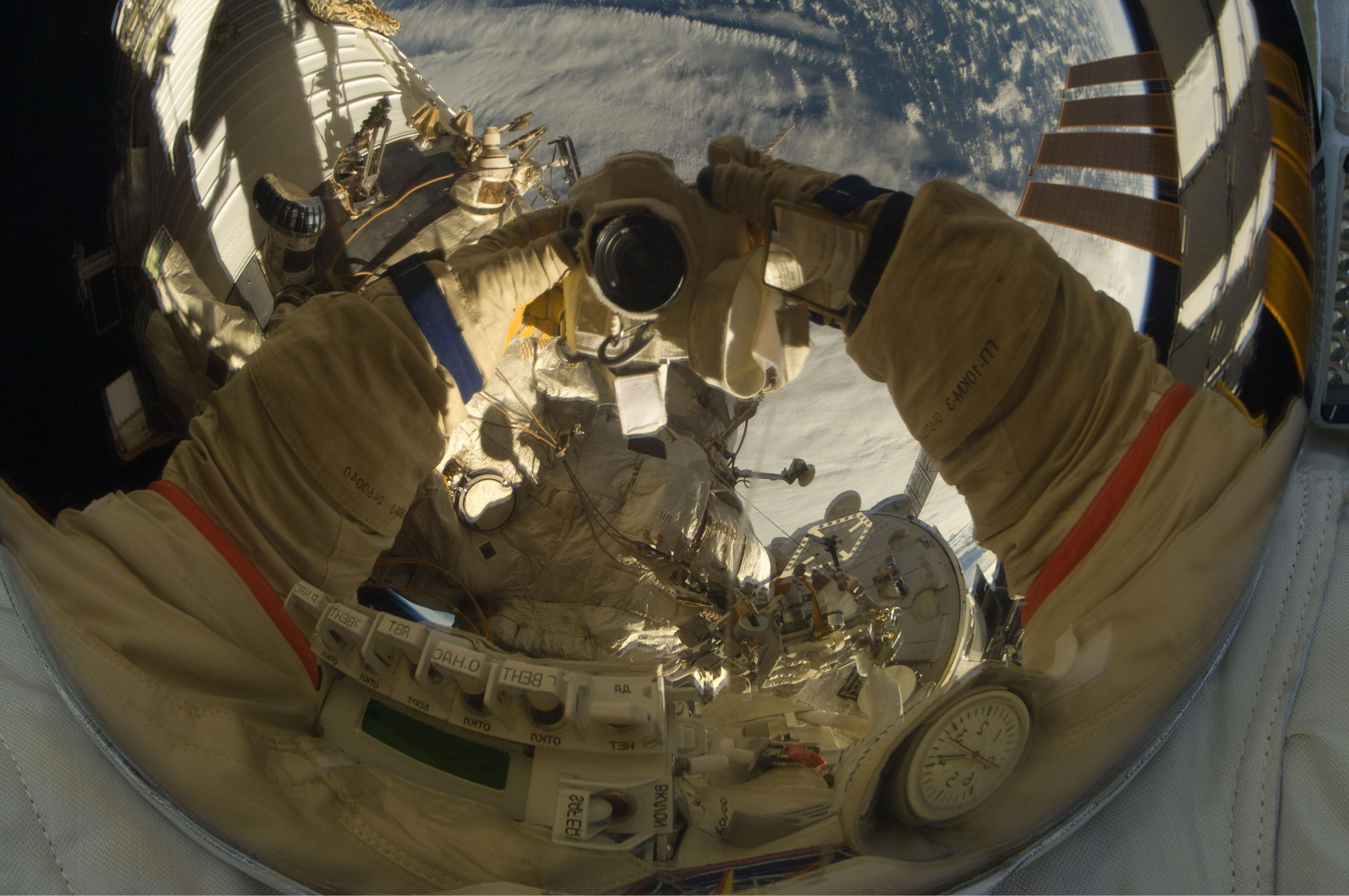
Kotov used a digital still camera to take this self-portrait during a January 2010 space-walk.

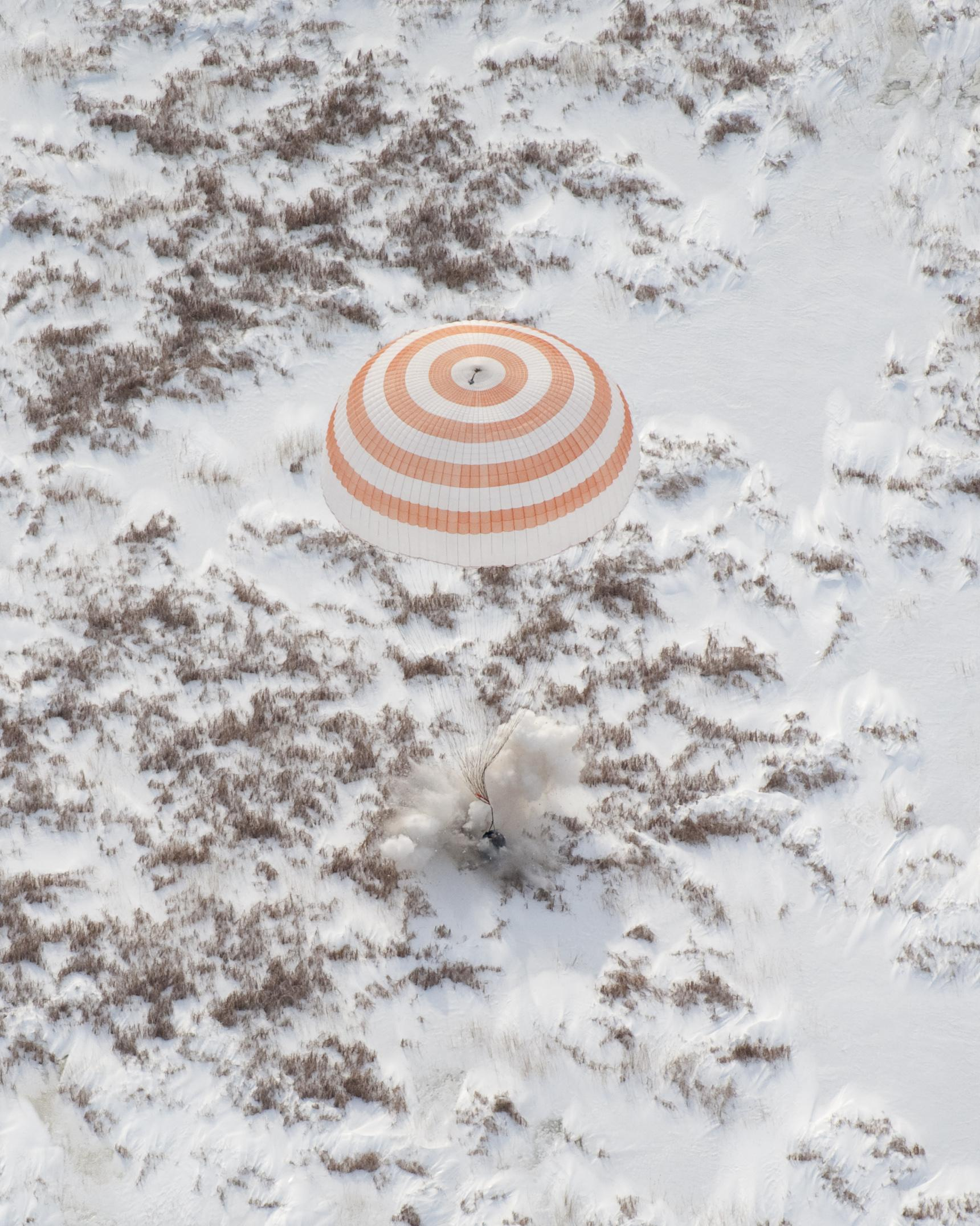
The Expedition 22 crew landed on Thursday, 18 March 2010.

== See also ==
- 2010 in spaceflight
- List of human spaceflights
- List of International Space Station spacewalks
- List of spacewalks 2000–2014
