= Naoko Yamazaki =

Japanese astronaut and engineer (born 1970)

- 山崎 直子
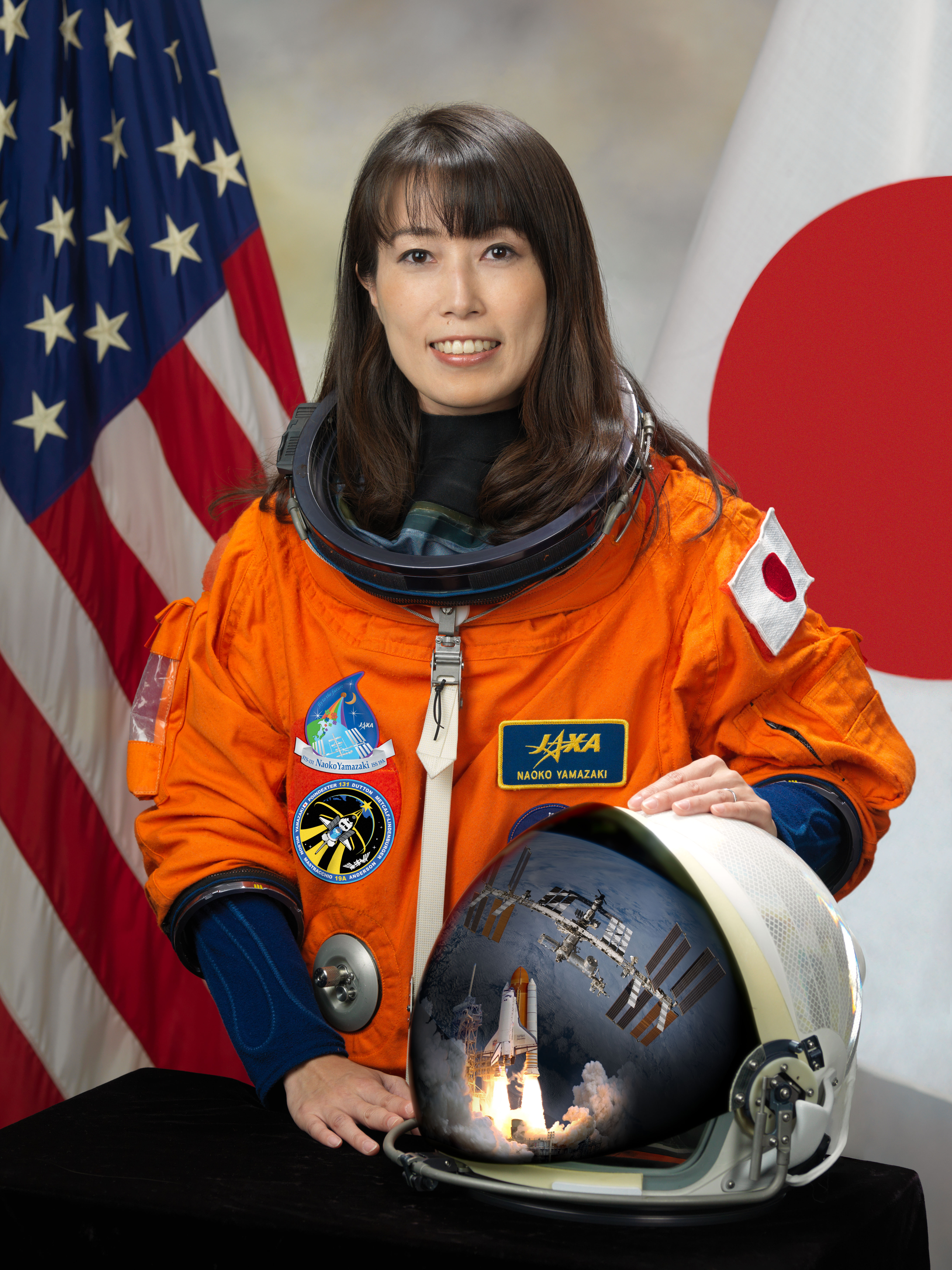
- Yamazaki in 2009
- Born: December 27, 1970 (age 55); Matsudo, Chiba, Japan
- Occupations: Engineer, Researcher
- Spouse: Taichi Yamazaki (divorced)
- Space career

NASDA/JAXA astronaut
- Status: Retired
- Time in space: 15 days, 2 hours, 47 minutes
- Selection: 1999 NASDA Group
- Missions: STS-131
- Retired: August 31, 2011

Naoko Yamazaki (山崎 直子, Yamazaki Naoko; born December 27, 1970) is a Japanese engineer and former astronaut at JAXA. She was the second Japanese woman to fly in space. The first was Chiaki Mukai.

== Early life ==
Yamazaki was born Naoko Sumino in Matsudo City. She spent two years of her childhood in Sapporo. After graduating from Ochanomizu University Senior High School in 1989, Yamazaki earned a Bachelor of Science degree with a major in Aerospace Engineering from the University of Tokyo in 1993 and a Master of Science degree with a major in Aerospace Engineering in 1996.

== JAXA career ==
Yamazaki joined the National Space Development Agency of Japan (NASDA) in 1996 and was part of the development team for the system integration of the Japanese Experiment Module (JEM). She also worked on the JEM failure analysis and creating initial operation procedures. From June 1998 to March 2000, she was part of the ISS Centrifuge team (life science experiment facility) conducting conceptual framework and preliminary design.

Yamazaki was selected as an astronaut candidate in February 1999 by the National Space Development Agency of Japan (NASDA, now JAXA), attended the ISS Astronaut Basic Training program beginning in April 1999, and was certified as an astronaut in September 2001. Since 2001, Yamazaki has participated in ISS Advanced Training and supported the development of the hardware and operation of the Japanese Experiment Module. In May 2004, Yamazaki completed Soyuz-TMA Flight Engineer training at the Yuri Gagarin Cosmonauts Training Center in Star City, Russia.

=== NASA experience ===
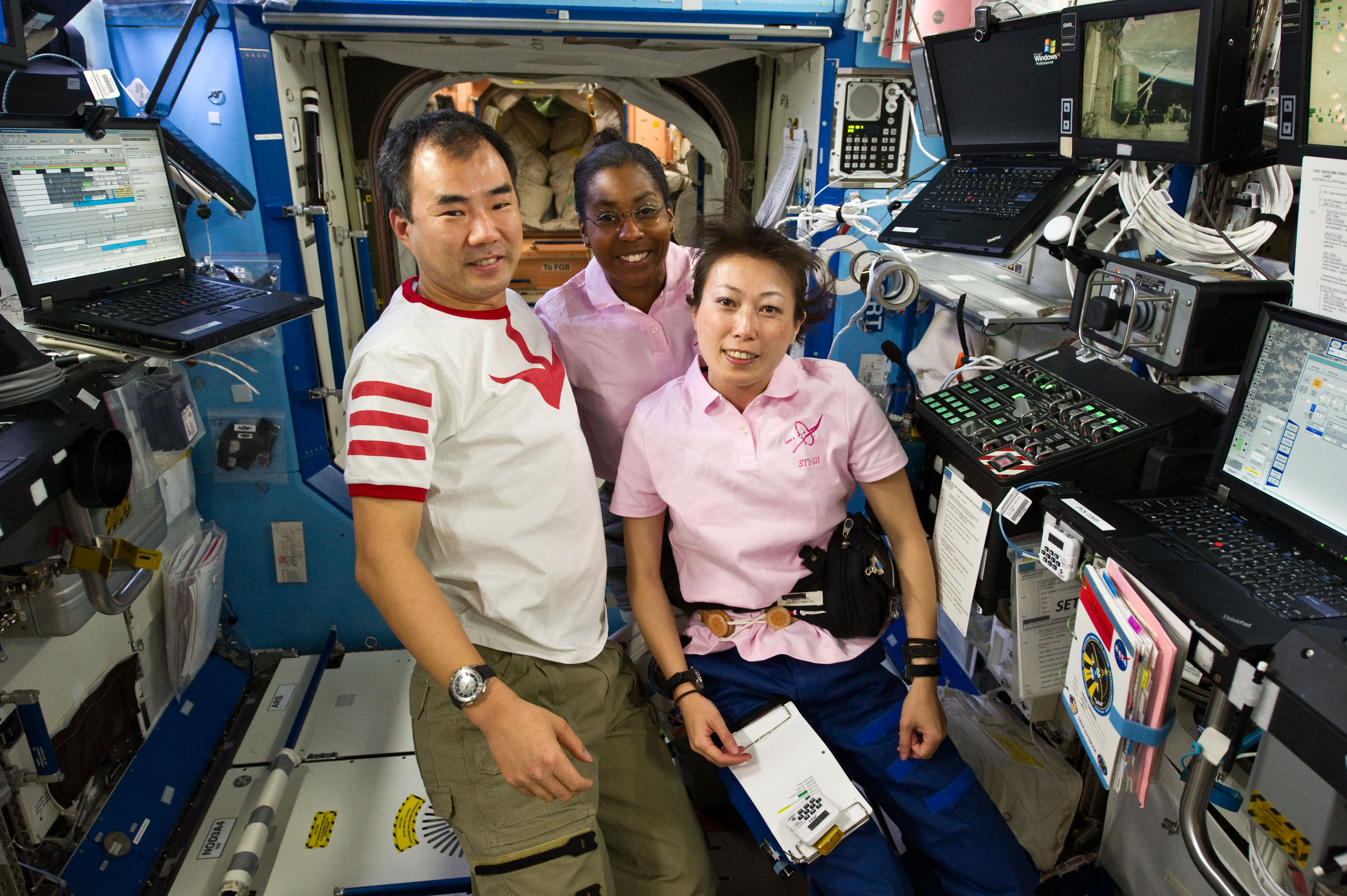
Astronauts Soichi Noguchi, Expedition 23 flight engineer, Naoko Yamazaki and Stephanie Wilson in the Destiny laboratory of the International Space Station during mission STS-131

In June 2004, Yamazaki arrived at the Johnson Space Center in Houston, Texas to begin Astronaut Candidate Training school, where she was assigned to the Astronaut Office Robotics Branch. She was selected as a NASA mission specialist in 2006.

In November 2008, JAXA announced that Yamazaki would become the second Japanese woman to fly in space on STS-131, which launched on 5 April 2010. Since the Space Shuttle retired the following year in 2011, she was also the last Japanese astronaut to fly the Space Shuttle.

On April 5, 2010, Yamazaki entered space on the shuttle Discovery as part of mission STS-131. She returned to Earth on April 20, 2010.

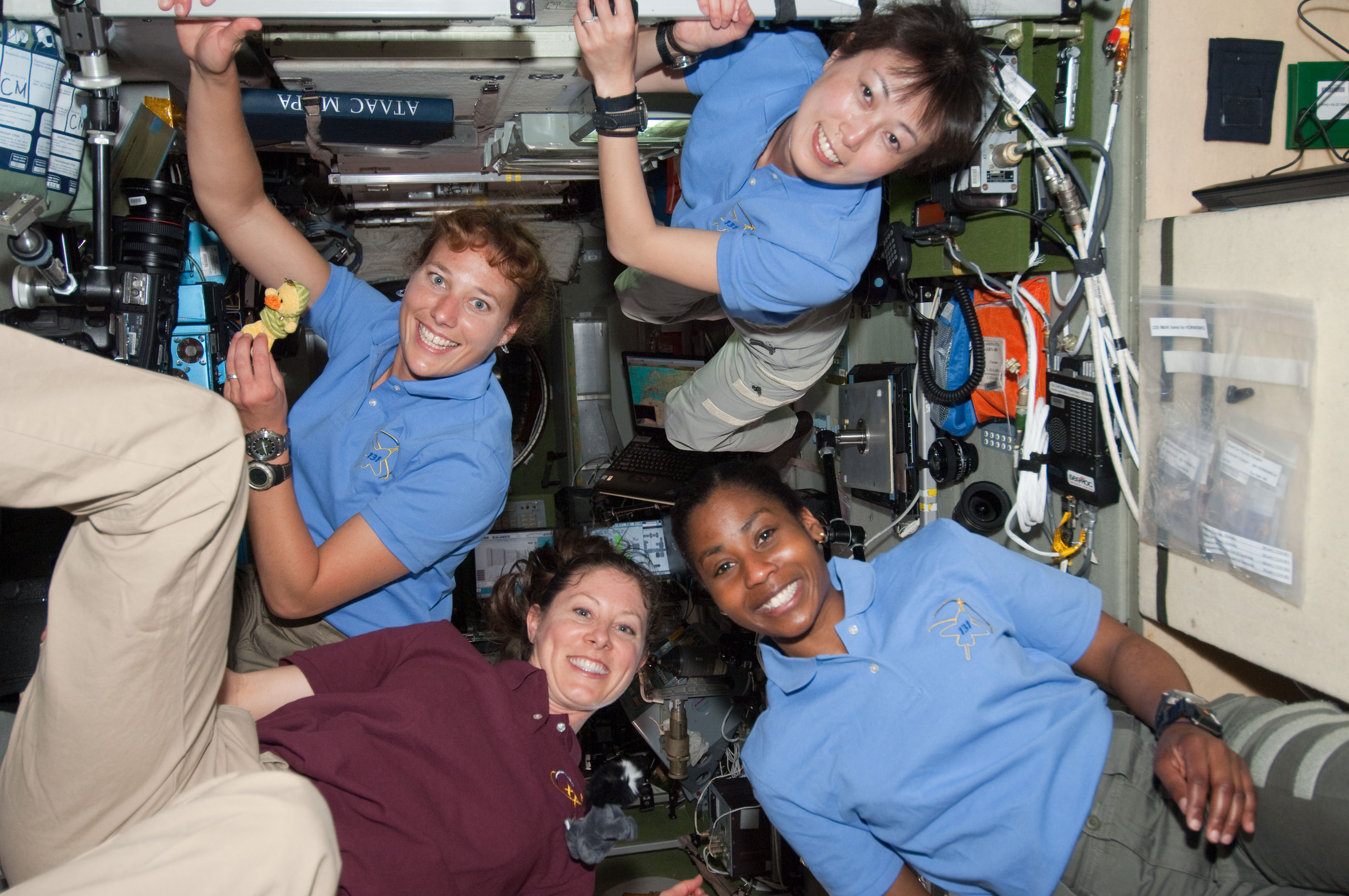
The four astronauts of STS-131 and Expedition 23 (Yamazaki on the top right), the first time four women being at the same time in space.

Yamazaki retired from JAXA on August 31, 2011.

== Post JAXA ==
After returning to Earth, after spending a total of 15.12 days in space, Yamazaki continued her studies and research University of Tokyo since December 2010.

Since 2011, Yamazaki has been involved with promoting STEM activities as well as being a member of the Japanese government Space Policy Committee.

In July 2018, Yamazaki co-founded the Space Port Japan Association, which is an organization to support efforts to open spaceports in Japan through collaboration with companies, groups and government institutions. She is an adviser to the Young Astronaut Club, and Chairman of the Women in Aerospace program of the Japan Rocket Society.

As of July 2019, Yamazaki was a PhD student at the Intelligent Space Systems Lab in the University of Tokyo.

== Personal life ==
Yamazaki was married to Taichi Yamazaki and the couple have two children; they were divorced in February 2012. She enjoys scuba diving, snow skiing, flying and music.

In 2007, Yamazaki provided the voice as herself in episode 7 of the anime Rocket Girls.

== See also ==
- Women in space
- List of female astronauts
