= Timothy Creamer =

NASA flight director, astronaut and US Army officer (born 1959)

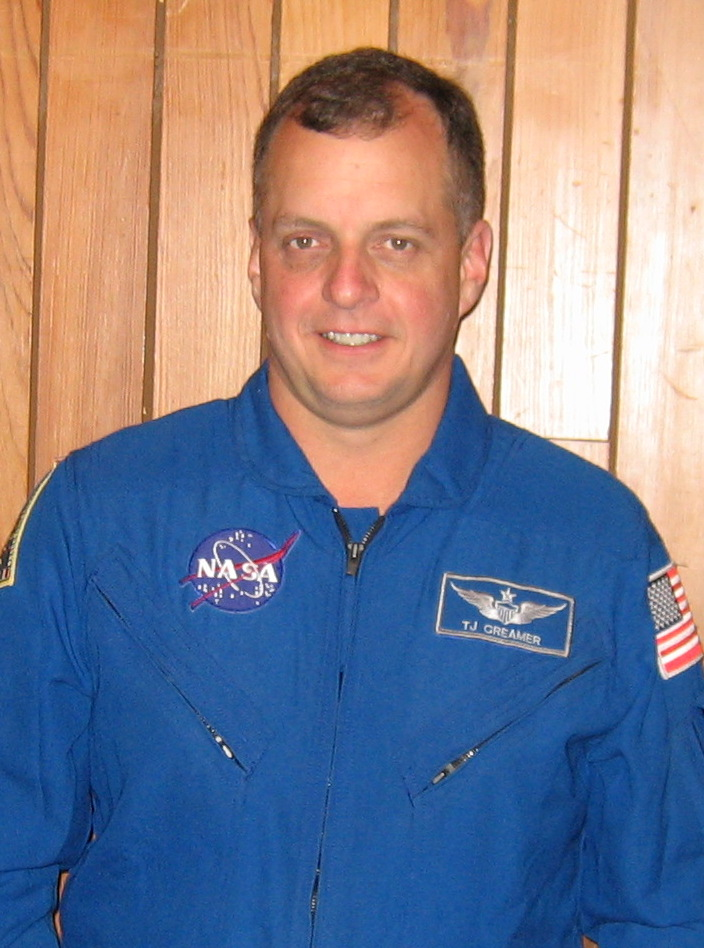
- Born: Timothy John Creamer; November 15, 1959 (age 67); Huachuca City, Arizona, U.S.
- Other name: T. J.
- Education: Loyola University Maryland (BS); Massachusetts Institute of Technology (MS)
- Space career

NASA astronaut
- Rank: Colonel, USA
- Time in space: 163d 5h 33m
- Selection: NASA Group 17 (1998)
- Missions: Soyuz TMA-17 (Expedition 22/23)
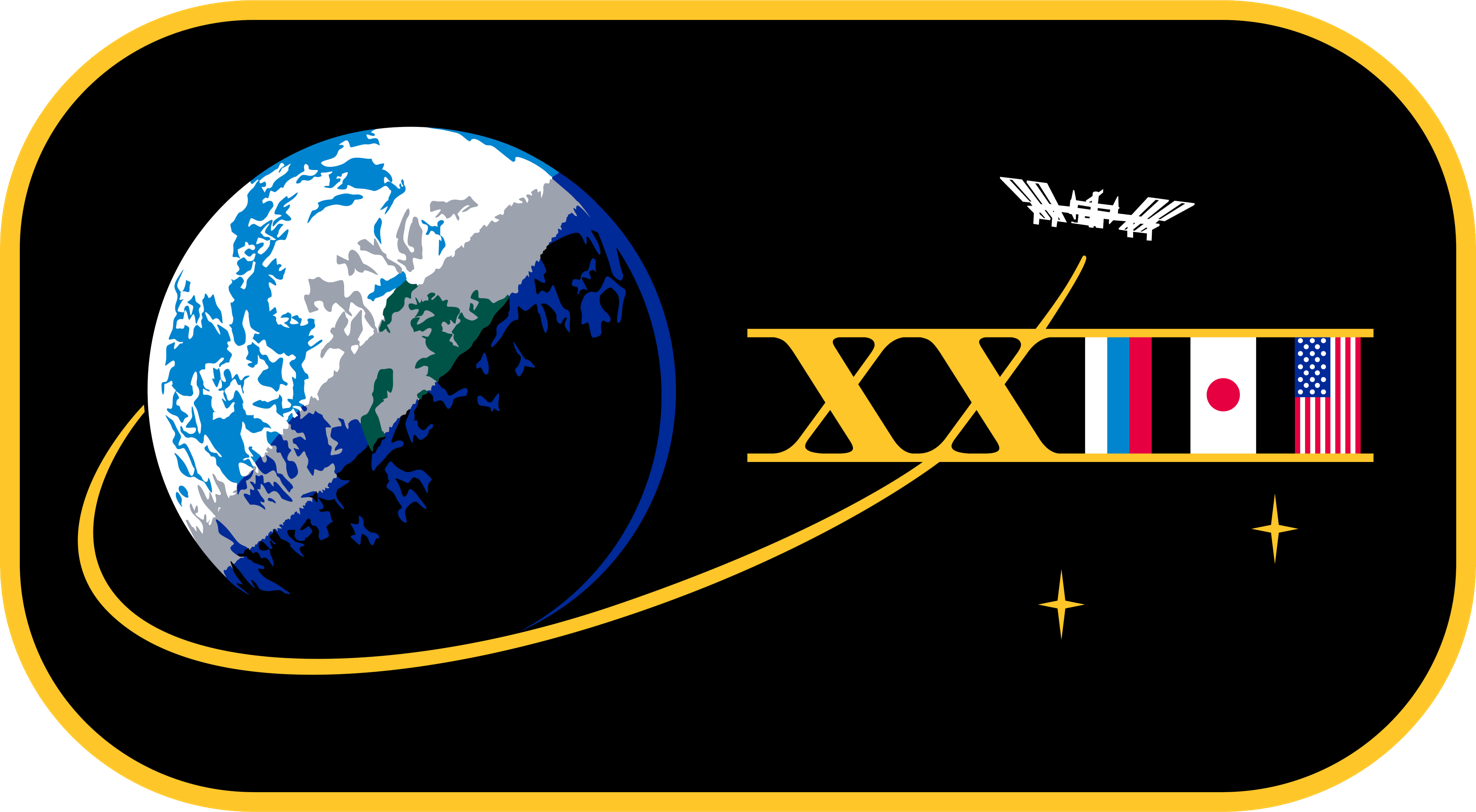
- Mission insignia

Timothy John Creamer (born November 15, 1959) is a NASA flight director, retired astronaut and a colonel in the United States Army. Creamer was born in Fort Huachuca, Arizona, but considers Upper Marlboro, Maryland, to be his hometown. He is married to the former Margaret E. Hammer. They have two children.

== Education ==
Bishop McNamara High School, Forestville, Maryland, 1978. B.S., Chemistry, Loyola College, Baltimore, Maryland, 1982. M.S., Physics, Massachusetts Institute of Technology, 1992.

== Military career ==
Creamer graduated from Loyola College in May 1982 with a bachelor of science degree in chemistry, and was commissioned through the ROTC program as a second lieutenant in the U.S. Army. He entered the U.S. Army Aviation School in December 1982 and was designated as an Army Aviator in August 1983, graduating as the Distinguished Graduate from his class. He was subsequently assigned to the 1st Armored Division as a section leader, platoon leader, flight operations officer, and as a personnel staff officer for the 501st Attack Helicopter Battalion. In 1987, he was assigned to the 82nd Airborne Division as a commander of an air cavalry troop in the 17th Cavalry Regiment, and later as the personnel officer of the 82nd Aviation Brigade. Following this assignment, he completed a Master of Science degree in physics at MIT in 1992, and was subsequently assigned to the Department of Physics at the United States Military Academy as an assistant professor. Other military schools include the Army Parachutist Course, Army Jumpmaster Course, the Combined Arms Services Staff School, and the Command and General Staff College. Prior to his astronaut selection in 1998, he had been working as a space operations officer, with the Army Space Command, stationed in Houston, Texas. He is now the Army's NASA Detachment commander.

== NASA career ==
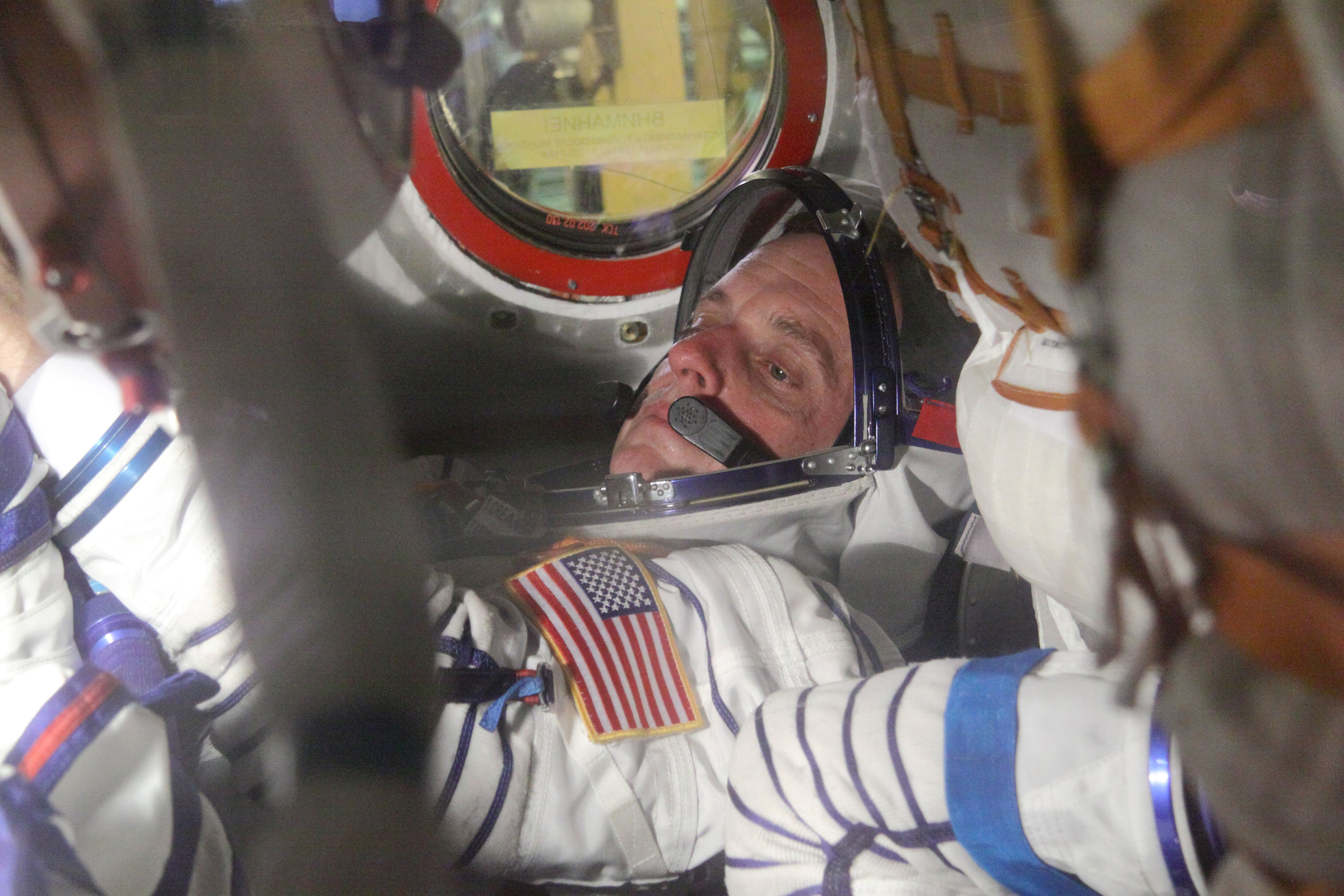
Creamer inside Soyuz TMA-17 spacecraft during launch dress rehearsal

Creamer was assigned to NASA at the Johnson Space Center (JSC) in July 1995 as a Space Shuttle vehicle integration test engineer. His duties primarily involved engineering liaison for launch and landing operations of the Space Shuttle. He was actively involved in the integrated tests of the systems for each Orbiter for its preparations for its next flight, and directly supported eight Shuttle missions as a vehicle integration test team lead. Additionally, he focused his efforts in coordinating the information technologies for the Astronaut Office to aid personnel in their electronic communications both on JSC as well as through their travels to other centers.

Selected by NASA in June 1998, Creamer reported for Astronaut Candidate Training in August 1998. Having completed the initial two years of intensive Space Shuttle and Space Station training, he was assigned technical duties in the Space Station Branch of the Astronaut Office, where his primary focus involved the command and control computers on Space Station, as well as the office automation support computers, and the operational Local Area Network encompassing all international partners and modules.

Beginning November 2000, Creamer became the crew support astronaut for the Expedition 3 crew, which was on orbit from August 2001 to December 2001. He was the primary contact for all the crew needs, coordination, planning and interactions, and was the primary representative of the crew while they were on orbit.

Starting March 2002, Creamer headed the Hardware Integration Section of the Space Station Branch, responsible for ensuring all hardware configurations were properly integrated, and that all operational aspects of the future International Space Station (ISS) hardware are accounted for. In October 2004, he was assigned to be the astronaut office representative and coordinator for all things relating to on-orbit information technologies.

Creamer was next assigned to the Robotics Branch, dealing with the international partners on all computer aspects of Robotics operations, as well as all of the command and control software and user interfaces. Additionally, he was the real-time support lead for Expedition 12 for all things involving the robotics operations on the International Space Station.

In September 2006, Creamer served as an aquanaut during the NEEMO 11 mission aboard the Aquarius underwater laboratory, living and working underwater for seven days.

=== Expedition 22/23 ===
In 2009 Creamer served as backup for Expedition 20 Flight Engineer Timothy Kopra, who launched toward the ISS on STS-127.

Following his time as Kopra's backup, Creamer was assigned to the prime crew of Expedition 22/Expedition 23, alongside Roscosmos cosmonaut Oleg Kotov and JAXA astronaut Soichi Noguchi, the trio launched onboard Soyuz TMA-17 from the Baikonur Cosmodrome in Kazakhstan on 20 December 2009. The trio docked to the ISS two days later, joining Expedition 22 crew members Jeff Williams of NASA and Maksim Surayev of Roscosmos.

Because science is the prime reason for the ISS, Creamer also certified as a payload operations director in Huntsville, AL, helping to coordinate real-time operations of all ISS-based science events, the first flown astronaut to do so.

On January 22, 2010, Creamer was the first astronaut to live tweet from the space.

=== Flight director ===
On August 16, 2016, Creamer was the first astronaut to be certified as a flight director at NASA's Johnson Space Center.

== Awards and honors ==
- Defense Superior Service Medal
- Legion of Merit
- Meritorious Service Medal (2nd Oak Leaf Cluster)
- Army Achievement Medal (1st Oak Leaf Cluster)
- Air Force Space and Missile Badge
- National Defense Service Medal
- Russian Federation of Astronautics Yuri Gagarin Medal
- Senior Army Aviator
- Senior Parachutist
- Jump Master
- Distinguished Graduate of the U.S. Army Aviation School

== Awards ==
Ribbon	Description	Notes
	Defense Superior Service Medal	
	Meritorious Service Medal	with 2 oak leaf clusters
	Army Achievement Medal	
	National Defense Service Medal	with one service star
	Army Service Ribbon	
	NASA Space Flight Medal	

== Organizations ==
He is a member of Alpha Sigma Nu, Phi Kappa Phi, Sigma Pi Sigma, Army Aviation Association of America, Association of the United States Army, and the British-American Project.
