= Soichi Noguchi =

Japanese astronaut and engineer (born 1965)

- 野口 聡一
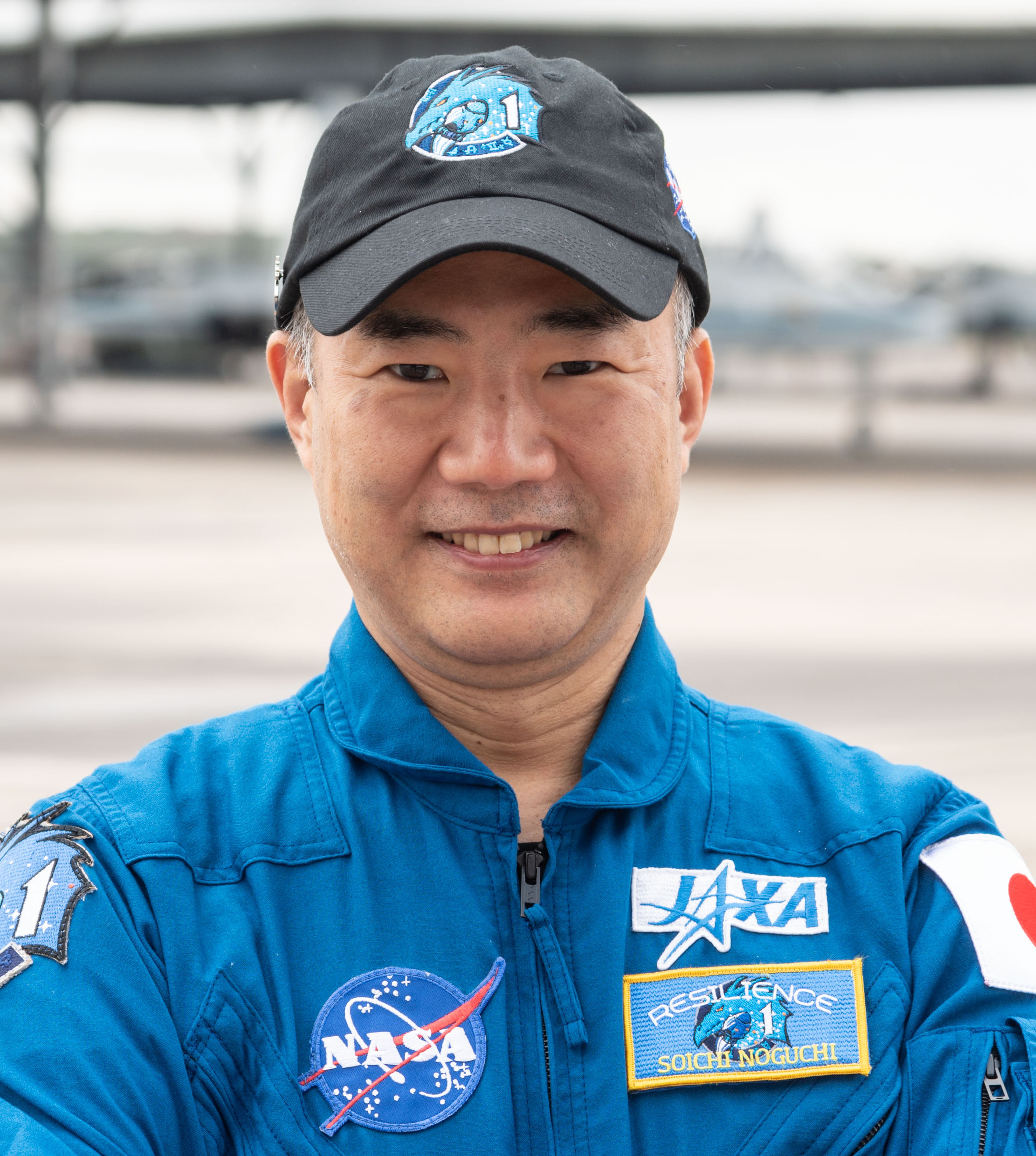
- Noguchi in 2020
- Born: 15 April 1965 (age 61); Yokohama, Japan
- Occupation: Engineer
- Space career

JAXA astronaut
- Status: Retired
- Time in space: 344 days, 9 hours, 33 minutes
- Selection: 1996 NASDA Group; NASA Group 16 (1996)
- Total EVAs: 4
- Total EVA time: 27 hours, 1 minute
- Missions: STS-114; Soyuz TMA-17 (Expedition 22/23); SpaceX Crew-1 (Expedition 64/65)
- Retired: June 1, 2022

Soichi Noguchi (野口 聡一, Noguchi Sōichi; born 15 April 1965) is a Japanese aeronautical engineer and former JAXA astronaut. His first spaceflight was as a mission specialist aboard STS-114 on 26 July 2005 for NASA's first "return to flight" Space Shuttle mission after the Columbia disaster. He was also in space as part of the Soyuz TMA-17 crew and Expedition 22 to the International Space Station (ISS), returning to Earth on 2 June 2010. He is the sixth Japanese astronaut to fly in space, the fifth to fly on the Space Shuttle, and the first to fly on Crew Dragon.

His third flight was on board the Dragon 2 capsule for the SpaceX Crew-1 mission which launched successfully on 15 November 2020 and landed on 2 May 2021. This makes him the third astronaut to fly on three different launch systems.

He became a part-time lecturer at the graduate school of the University of Tokyo since 2011, a project professor since 2021. As of 2022, he is a project professor at the Department of Aerospace Engineering, Nihon University.

He retired from astronaut duty and quit JAXA on 1 June 2022. He assumed the honorary director of CupNoodles Museum since 7 June 2022, the chief executive fellow of the Institute for International Socio-Economic Studies and the advisor of IHI Corporation since 1 July 2022. He is the representative of MiraiSpace Co., Ltd. (合同会社未来圏).

== Personal life ==
Soichi Noguchi was born on 15 April 1965 in Yokohama, Japan. He considers Chigasaki, Japan, to be his hometown. He holds flight instructor certificate as CFII and MEI. Noguchi was a Boy Scout. His hobbies include jogging, basketball, skiing and camping.

== Education ==
Noguchi graduated from Chigasaki-Hokuryo High School (Chigasaki, Kanagawa) in 1984, and then studied at the University of Tokyo, earning a B.S. degree in 1989 and an M.S. degree in 1991, both in Aeronautical Engineering. Later on, he furthermore obtained a Ph.D. degree in Advanced Interdisciplinary Studies in 2020, also from the University of Tokyo.

== Engineering career ==
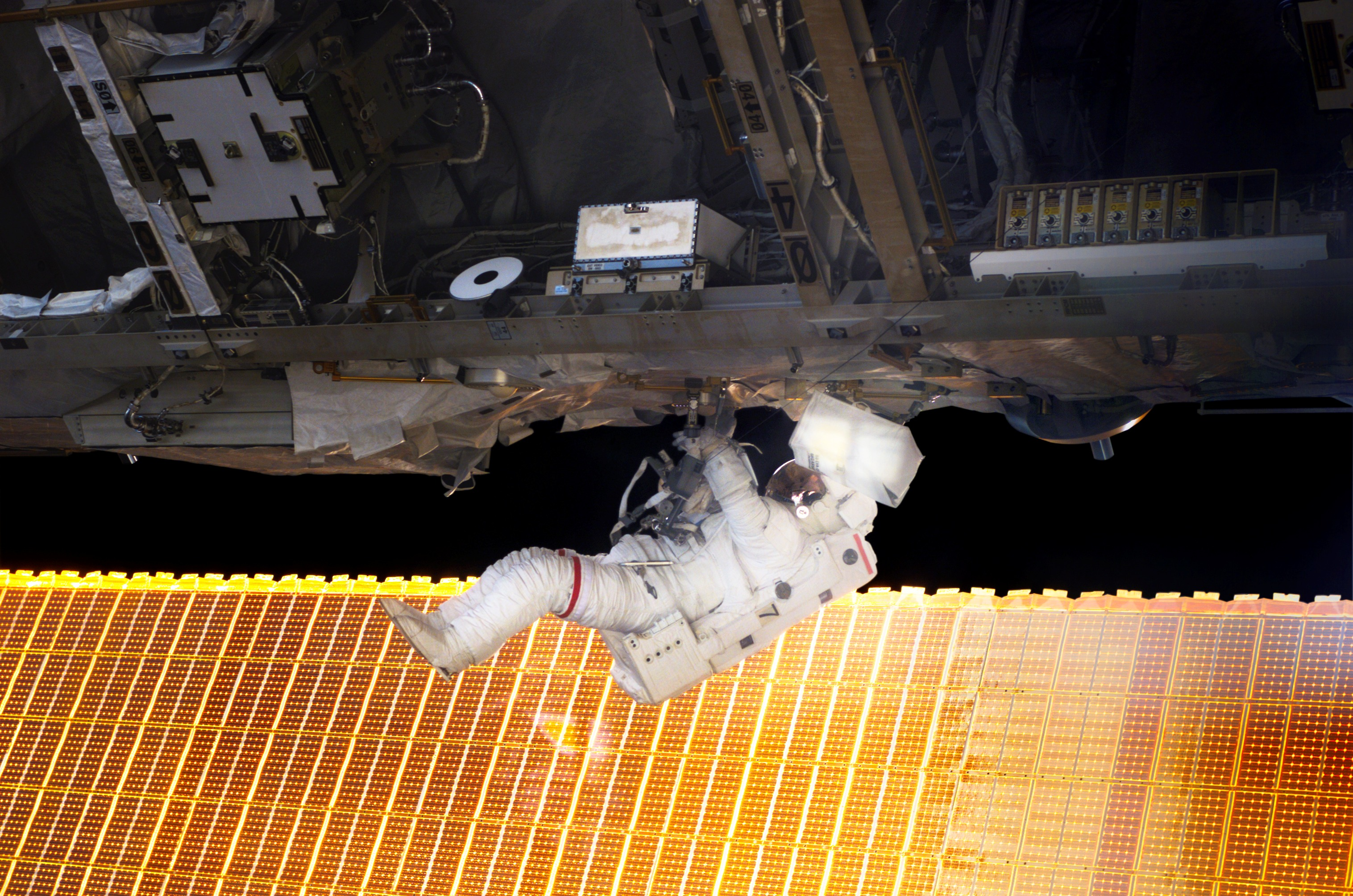
Soichi Noguchi on his first spacewalk

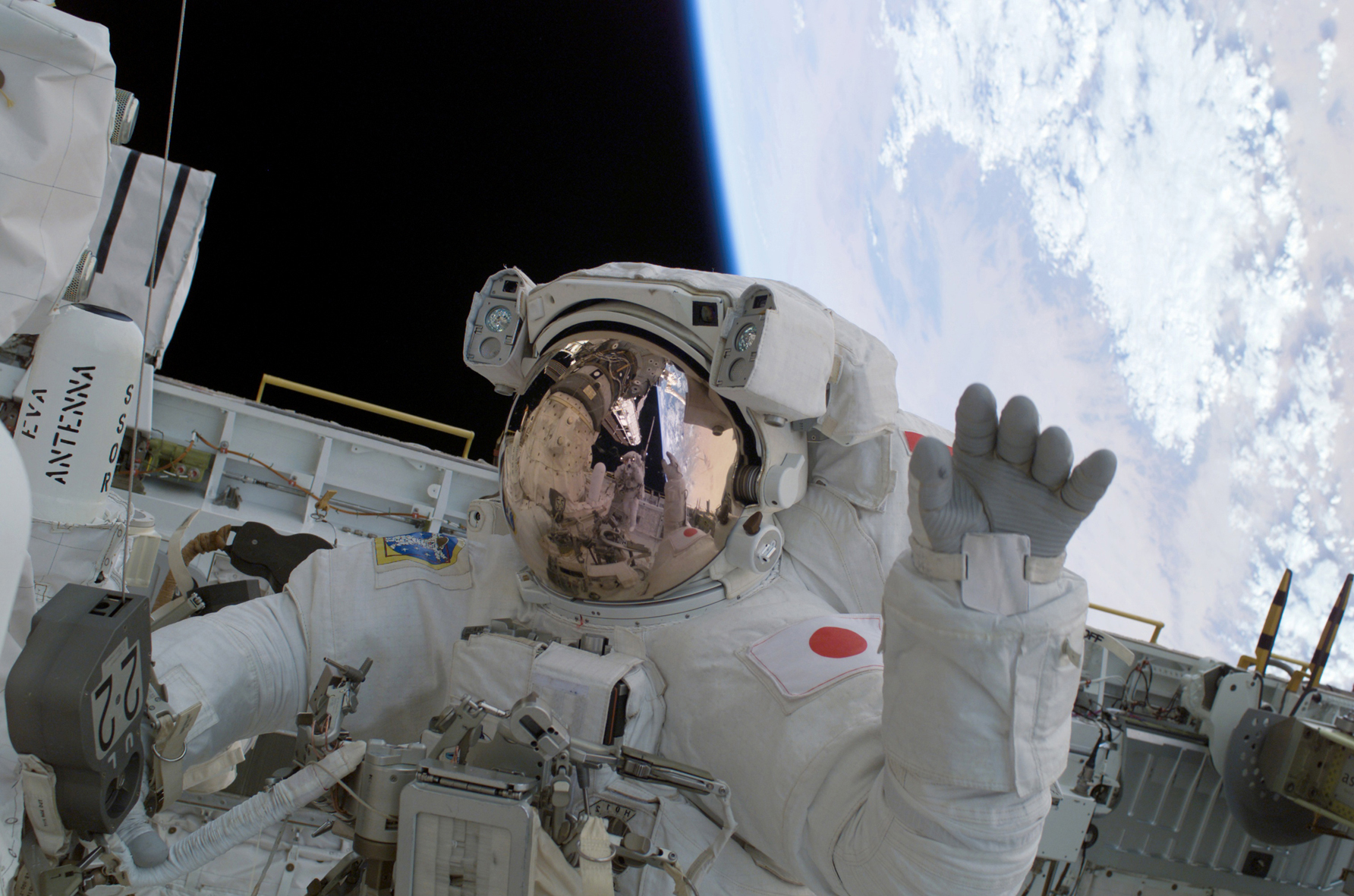
During the mission's second spacewalk, STS-114 astronaut Soichi Noguchi waves from the Shuttle payload bay

After graduation, Noguchi worked for Ishikawajima-Harima Heavy Industries, assigned to the research and development department of their Aero-Engine and Space Operations division. He worked on aerodynamic design of commercial engines.

== Astronaut career ==
Noguchi was selected as an astronaut candidate by the National Space Development Agency of Japan (now part of JAXA) in June 1996. In August 1996, he reported to NASA's Johnson Space Center for NASA astronaut training. Noguchi qualified as a mission specialist after two years, and received training on Russian space systems at Gagarin Cosmonaut Training Center in 1998. He was assigned to technical support for the Japanese Experiment Module of the International Space Station.

In 2013, Noguchi served as cavenaut into the ESA CAVES training in Sardinia, alongside David Saint-Jaques, Andreas Mogensen, Nikolai Tikhonov, Andrew Feustel and Michael Fincke.

=== STS-114 ===
In April 2001 Noguchi was assigned to the crew of STS-114 as a mission specialist, which at that point the flight was targeting launch to the ISS in 2003 aboard Space Shuttle Atlantis, he was assigned to the crew alongside NASA astronauts Eileen Collins (Commander), James Kelly (Pilot) and Stephen Robinson (Mission Specialist), they were also scheduled to be joined by the Expedition 7 crew, who would remain aboard the ISS, replacing the Expedition 6 crew who would land aboard STS-114.

Noguchi and the crew trained for this flight until February 2003, when STS-107, the flight immediately prior to STS-114, broke up while returning to Earth, destroying the Space Shuttle Columbia and killing the seven astronauts on board; following this all shuttle flights were delayed. Since STS-114 was scheduled to be the next mission to fly following STS-107, its designation and crew were assigned as the "return to flight" mission, their flight remained relatively similar although new tasked needed to verify the changes made to the shuttle and the shuttle flight plan were added to the flight. Also, the delay in shuttle flights meant the launch of Expedition 7 was moved from STS-114 to Soyuz TMA-2, leaving three more seats to be filled on STS-114, NASA astronauts Charles Camarda, Wendy Lawrence and Andrew Thomas were added to the crew to take their place.

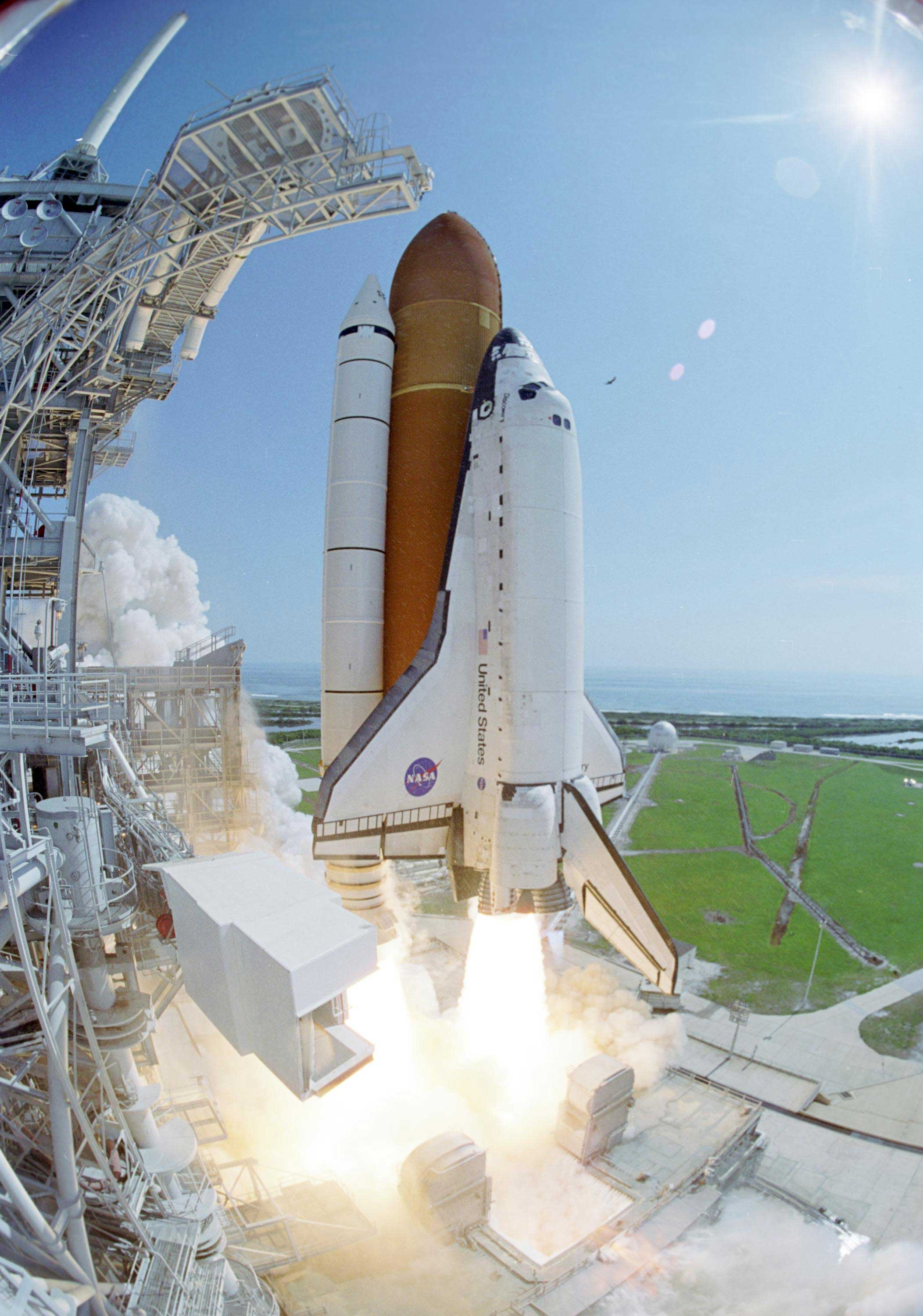
STS-114 during launch

STS-114 launched aboard Space Shuttle Discovery on 26 July 2005, over two years since the Columbia disaster. The shuttle docked to the ISS two days later, the crew joined the Expedition 11 crew consisting of Russian Commander Sergei Krikalev and American Flight Engineer John Phillips. Prior to docking to the station, Discovery and its crew performed the first-ever rendezvous pitch maneuver, which allowed the two crew members aboard the station to photograph and observe the shuttle's heat shield, allowing them to discover any possible damage on the spacecraft's heat shield. The maneuver was added following the Columbia disaster, which was caused by damage to the heat shield.

During his first stay aboard the station, Noguchi performed three spacewalks, all three alongside Robinson. On the first excursion outside, the two tested new techniques for repairing damaged tiles on the shuttle's heat shield, while the second and third spacewalks were both dedicated to upgrading and maintaining the space station, replacing a Control Movement Gyro which had suffered a mechanical failure in 2002 and installing an External stowage platform which was brought up aboard STS-114. Over the course of the three EVAs Noguchi spent 20 hours and 5 minutes outside the station.

Noguchi and his crew mates returned to Earth on 9 August 2005, carrying over 3,200 kg (7,055 lb) of equipment and trash down from the station inside the Multi-Purpose Logistics Module, which had been used to bring up supplies to the station two weeks earlier. Discovery's landing at the Kennedy Space Center wrapped up a 13-day, 21 hour, 32 minute and 48 second spaceflight.

=== Expedition 22/23 ===
Following STS-114, Noguchi was assigned as a backup ISS Flight Engineer for JAXA astronaut Koichi Wakata, who became the first Japanese astronaut to live long duration aboard the space station. Following his assignment as a backup for Wakata, JAXA assigned Noguchi to the crew of ISS Expedition 22/23 alongside Russian cosmonaut Oleg Kotov and NASA astronaut Timothy Creamer.

Noguchi and his two crew mates launched on 21 December 2009 aboard Soyuz TMA-17, he became the first JAXA astronaut and second Japanese citizen (following Tokyo Broadcasting System reporter Toyohiro Akiyama) to fly on a Soyuz spacecraft, the trio spent two days in free flight, before docking to the ISS and joining the Expedition 22 crew, joining American Commander Jeff Williams and Russian flight engineer Maksim Surayev.

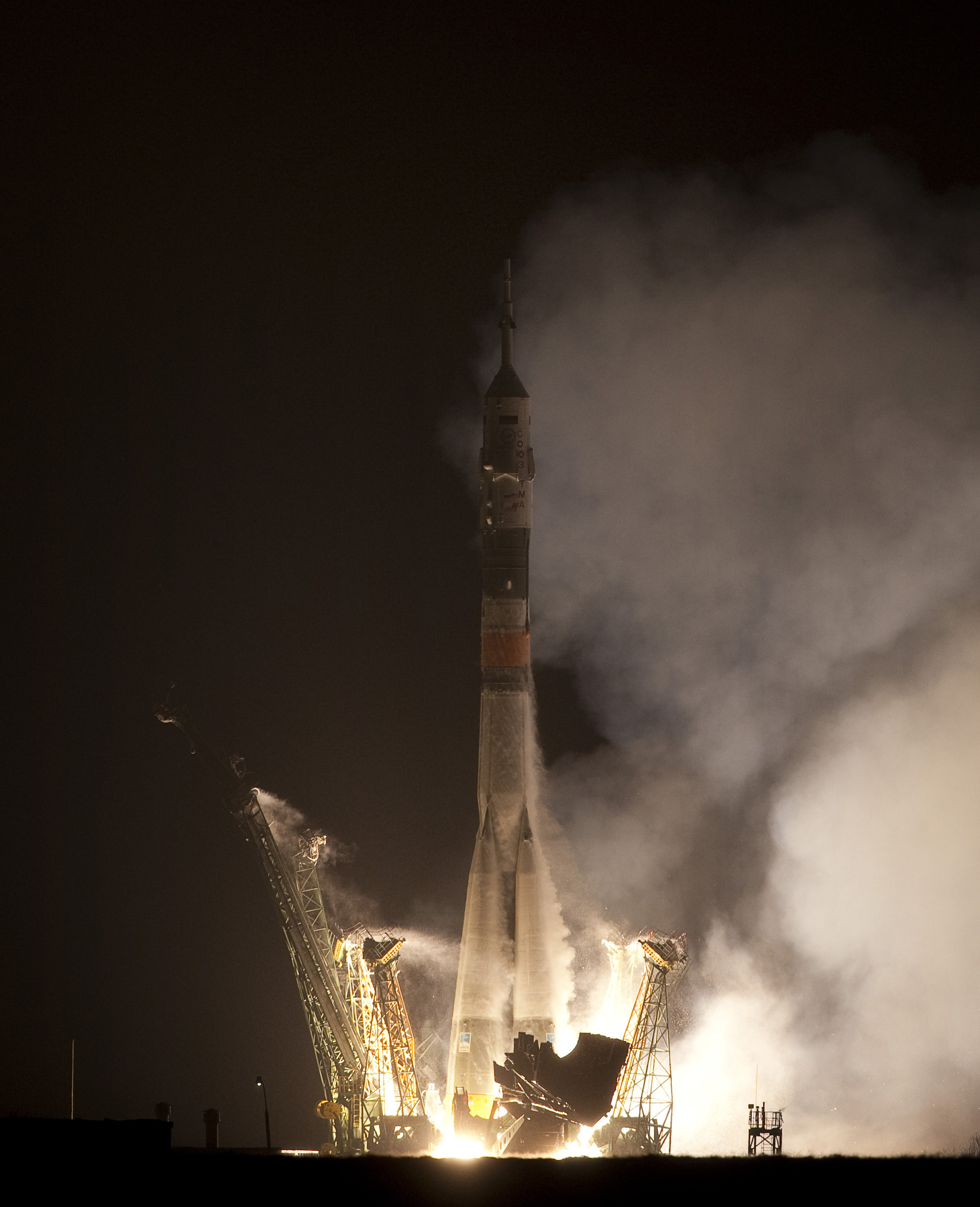
Soyuz TMA-17 launches to the ISS carrying Noguchi, Kotov and Creamer

During Expedition 22, the crew were visited by Space Shuttle Endeavour during its penultimate flight, STS-130, which delivered the Node 3 module and the Cupola to the station. During this flight Noguchi was also in space with his former STS-114 crewmate Stephen Robinson, who was mission specialist on STS-130. Soyuz TMA-16 returned to Earth on 18 March 2010, carrying Surayev and Williams and officially ending Expedition 22, following which Noguchi, Kotov, and Creamer transferred to Expedition 23, with Kotov taking command of the station. Shortly after they were joined by Soyuz TMA-18, carrying Russian cosmonauts Aleksandr Skvortsov and Mikhail Kornienko as well as American astronaut Tracy Caldwell Dyson.

Expedition 23 was visited by two Space Shuttle missions, STS-131 and STS-132. STS-131 delivered new supplies to the ISS aboard Space Shuttle Discovery, the flight also carried JAXA mission specialist Naoko Yamazaki, who joined Noguchi on the station for a short while, marking the first time two Japanese citizens were in space at the same time. Space Shuttle Atlantis launched to the station carrying the Russian Rassvet module to the station towards the end of Expedition 23.

Noguchi, joined by Kotov and Creamer undocked from the station and returned to Earth on 1 June 2010, the trio touched down in Kazakhstan following 163 days in space, bringing Noguchi's total time in space to 177 days.

=== Expedition 64/65 ===
On 7 November 2017 JAXA announced Noguchi had been assigned to the crew of Expedition 62/63 as a flight engineer, scheduled for launch toward the end of 2019. On 31 December 2018 he revealed his personal patch for the flight, during a tweet revealing the patch he also announced his mission would be launched aboard a Commercial Crew Vehicle, although it was not made clear whether his flight would take place aboard a SpaceX Crew Dragon or Boeing Starliner.

In March 2020 he was assigned to SpaceX Crew-1, the first operational flight of a SpaceX Dragon 2 spacecraft. Noguchi launched alongside NASA astronauts Michael Hopkins, Victor Glover, and Shannon Walker, on 15 November 2020. As well as Noguchi, all were members of the Expedition 64 crew on the International Space Station. He is the third person, and first non–American, to launch aboard three different spacecraft; the Space Shuttle, the Soyuz, and the Dragon 2.

During his third stay in space, he conducted his fourth career spacewalk with Kathleen Rubins on 5 March 2021, spending almost 7 hours outside the ISS.

He currently holds the world record of the longest gap between two consecutive spacewalks by the same person - 15 years and 214 days.

== Other highlights ==
Noguchi voices himself in episodes 13 and 26 of the anime series Uchū Kyōdai (Space Brothers), which aired on 24 June 2012 and 29 September 2012 respectively.

On 2 August 2015, Noguchi spoke to 33,628 fellow Scouts during the Arena Event at the 23rd World Scout Jamboree, held in Japan.

In 2021 he was recognized as a Genius 100 Visionary and contributed his vision of the future to the Genius 100 Foundation and shared it during his induction ceremony which was held on 14 March 2021, while he was aboard the International Space Station.
