= Soyuz TMA-17 =

2009 Russian crewed spaceflight to the ISS

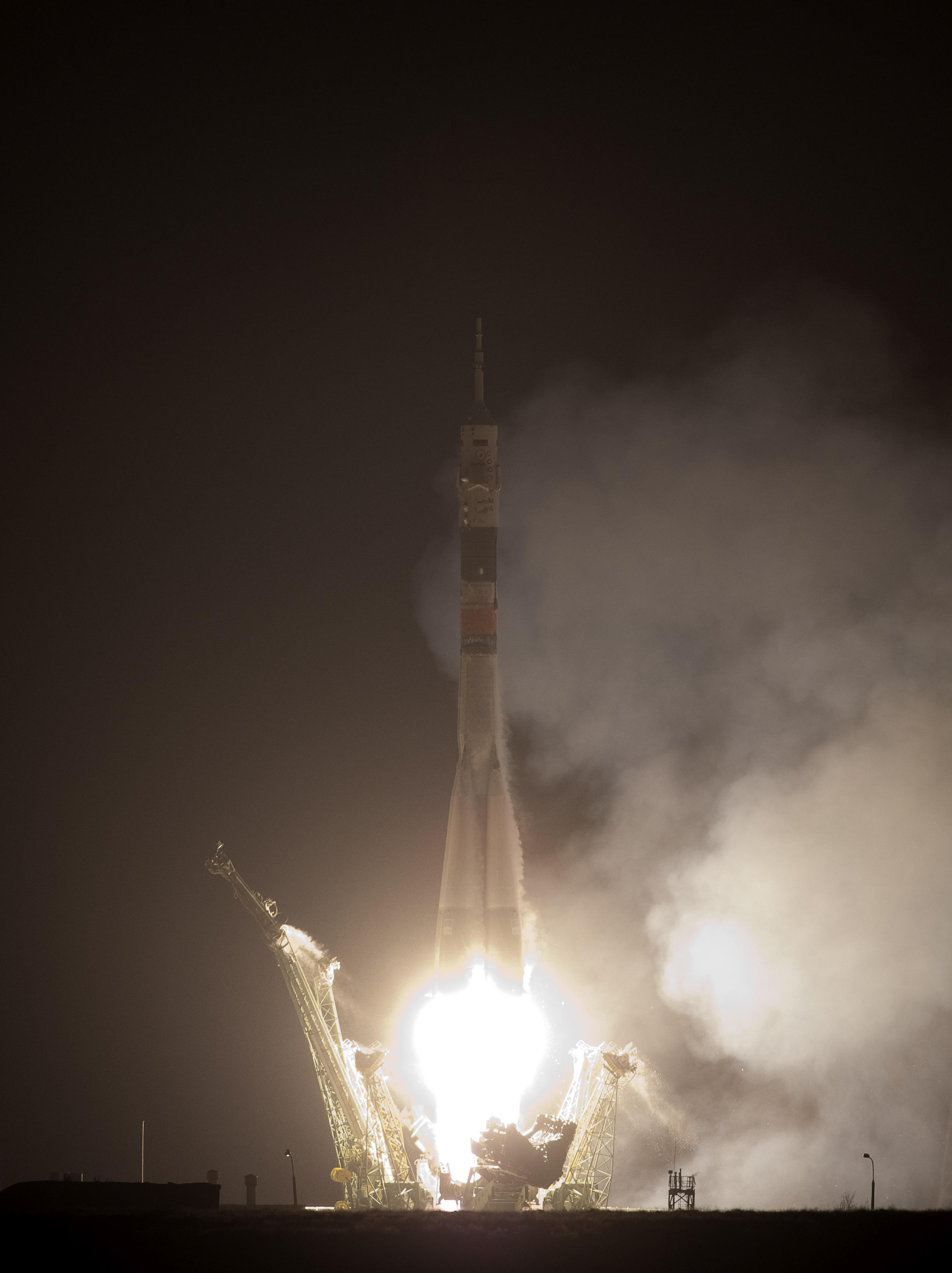
- Launch of TMA-17
- Mission type: Crewed mission to ISS
- Operator: Roscosmos
- COSPAR ID: 2009-074A
- SATCAT no.: 36129
- Mission duration: 164 days

Spacecraft properties
- Spacecraft type: Soyuz-TMA 11F732
- Manufacturer: Energia

Crew
- Crew size: 3
- Members: Oleg Kotov; Timothy Creamer; Soichi Noguchi
- Callsign: Pulsar

Start of mission
- Launch date: 20 December 2009, 21:52 UTC
- Rocket: Soyuz-FG
- Launch site: Baikonur, site 1/5

End of mission
- Landing date: 2 June 2010, 03:25 UTC
- Landing site: Steppes of Kazakhstan

Orbital parameters
- Reference system: Geocentric orbit
- Regime: Low Earth orbit
- Inclination: 51.66°

Docking with ISS
- Docking port: Zarya nadir
- Docking date: 22 December 2009, 22:48 UTC
- Undocking date: 12 May 2010, 13:26 UTC
- Time docked: 140 days, 14 hours and 38 minutes

Docking with ISS (Relocation)
- Docking port: Zvezda
- Docking date: 12 May 2010, 13:53 UTC
- Undocking date: 2 June 2010, 00:04 UTC
- Time docked: 20 days, 10 hours and 11 minutes
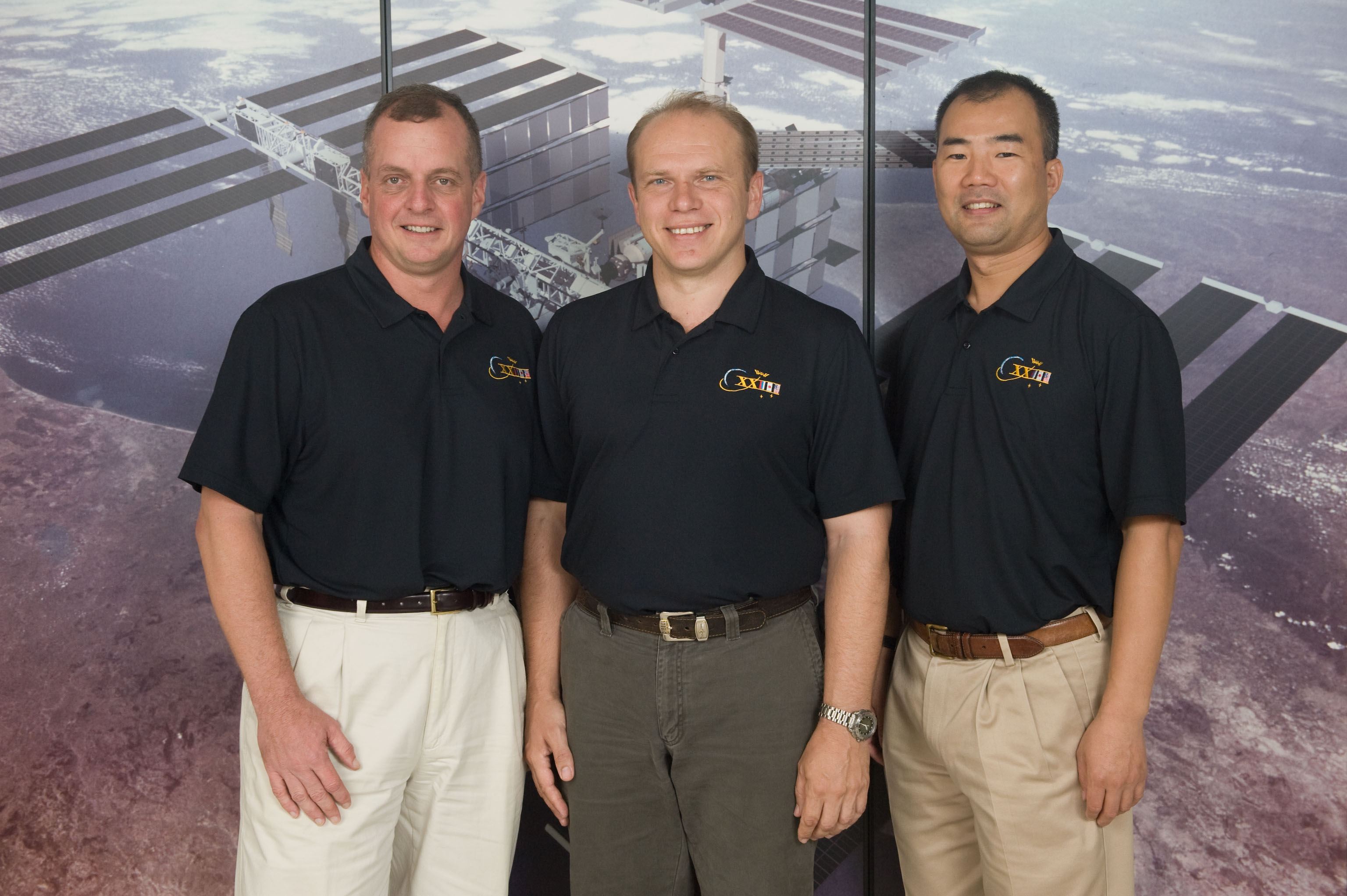
- From left to right: Creamer, Kotov and Noguchi Soyuz programme (Crewed missions)

Soyuz TMA-17 was a human spaceflight mission to the International Space Station (ISS). TMA-17 crew members participated in ISS Expedition 22 and Expedition 23. The mission ended when the Soyuz TMA-17 capsule landed on 2 June 2010.

== Crew ==
Position	Crew Member
Commander	(Russia) Oleg Kotov, Roscosmos; Expedition 22; Second spaceflight
Flight Engineer 1	(Japan) Soichi Noguchi, JAXA; Expedition 22; Second spaceflight
Flight Engineer 2	(United States) Timothy Creamer, NASA; Expedition 22; Only spaceflight

=== Crew notes ===
Noguchi is the first Japan Aerospace Exploration Agency (JAXA) astronaut and the second Japanese astronaut to fly on a Soyuz, after Toyohiro Akiyama.

=== Backup crew ===
Position	Crew Member
Commander	(Russia) Anton Shkaplerov, Roscosmos
Flight Engineer 1	(Japan) Satoshi Furukawa, JAXA
Flight Engineer 2	(United States) Douglas H. Wheelock, NASA

== Launch and docking ==
Soyuz TMA-17 was launched on 20 December 2009 and transported three members of the ISS Expedition 22 crew to the station. Soyuz TMA-17 was the 104th flight of a Soyuz spacecraft. The Soyuz remained docked to the space station for the remainder of the Expedition 22 increment serving as an emergency escape vehicle.

This mission marked the first Soyuz launch in the month of December for more than 19 years. The prior Soyuz launch in the month of December was Soyuz TM-11 on 2 December 1990.

This mission also included the last planned docking of a Soyuz at the nadir, or Earth-facing, port of the Zarya module. The Rassvet module was attached to Zarya's nadir port during the STS-132 mission.

== Relocation ==
On 12 May 2010, the Soyuz TMA-17 spacecraft was relocated to the aft port of the Zvezda module. At 14:23 UTC, Kotov, Creamer and Noguchi temporarily undocked the spacecraft from the nadir port of Zarya and flew it to the aft port of the Zvezda service module. The docking occurred at 14:53 UTC. After hooks and latches were engaged, the crew conducted leak checks, opened hatches around 17:40 UTC and then re-entered the station through the service module.

== Undocking and landing ==
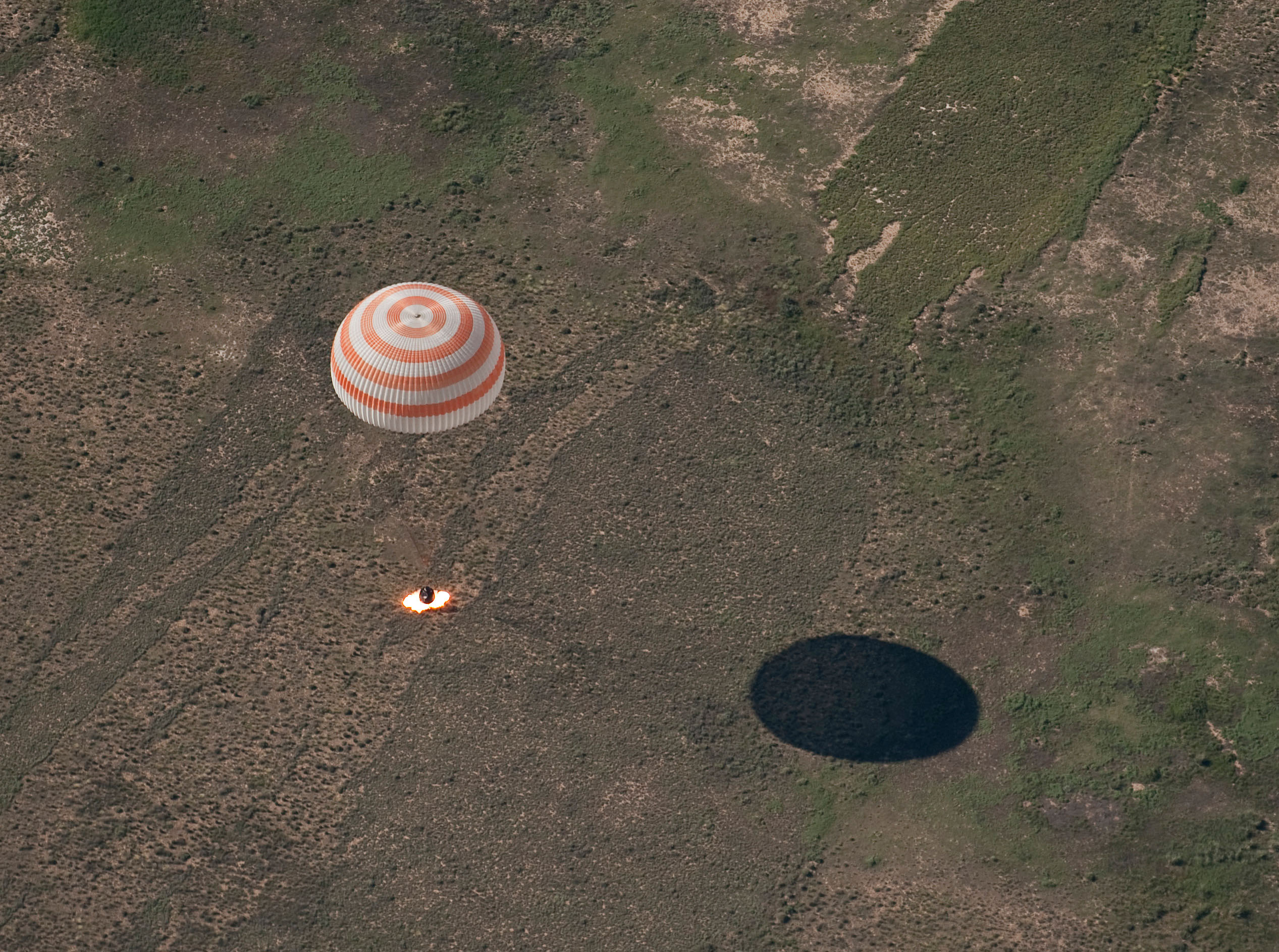
Soyuz TMA-17 capsule lands on the steppes of Kazakhstan.

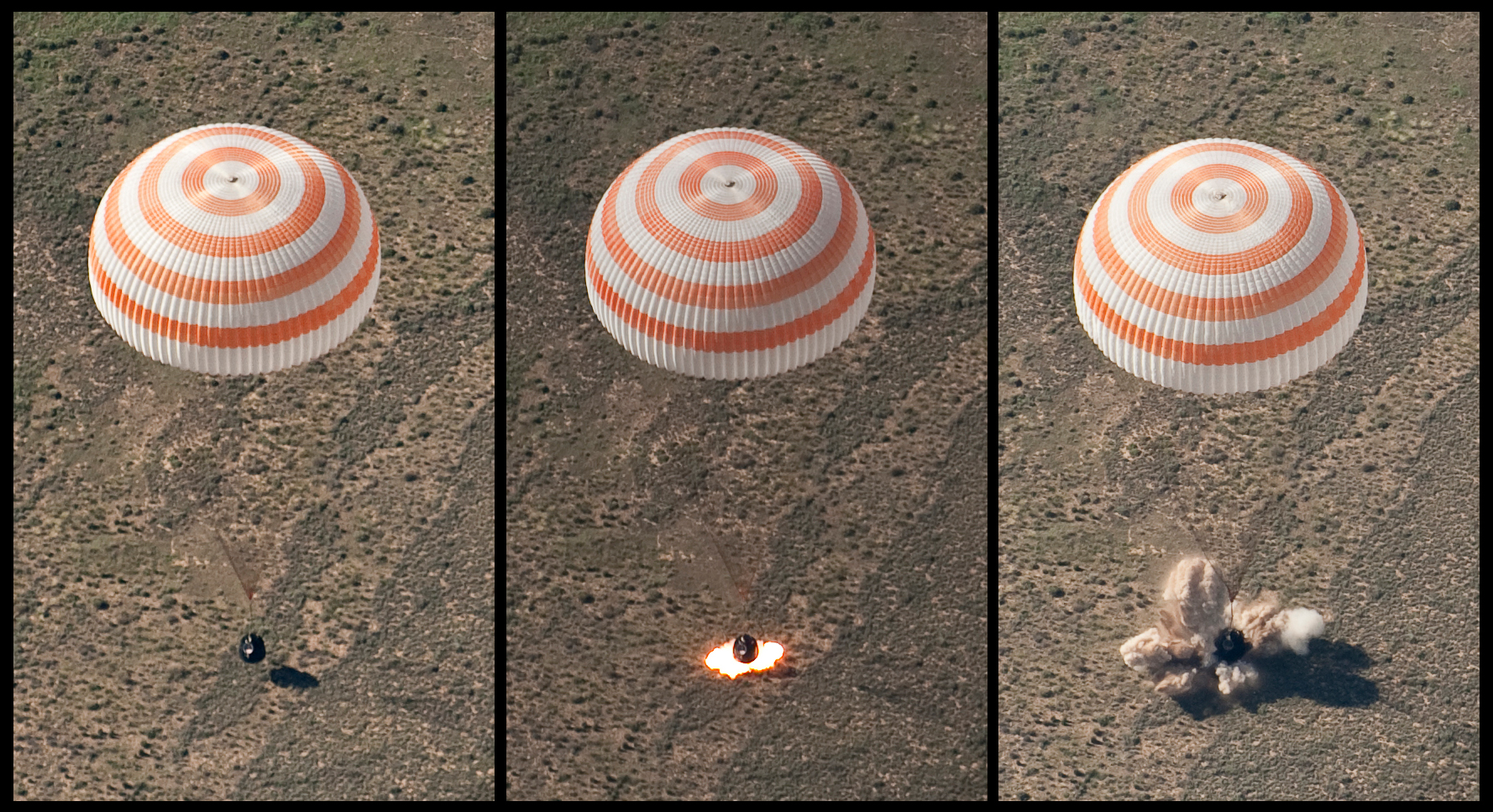
Soyuz TMA-17 firing its retro-rockets on landing.

On 26 May 2010, the orbital altitude of the International Space Station (ISS) was lowered by 1.5 kilometers to 345 kilometers to ensure perfect conditions for the re-entry of the Soyuz TMA-17 into the Earth's atmosphere. The orbit of the ISS was adjusted using the four engines on board the Progress M-05M spacecraft.

Expedition 23 commander Oleg Kotov was at the controls of the Soyuz TMA-17 spacecraft as it undocked at 00:04 UTC on 2 June 2010 from the space station's Zvezda module. The Soyuz TMA-17 crew capsule landed on the steppes of Kazakhstan at 03:25 UTC on 2 June 2010 wrapping up their stay aboard the space station.
