= Expedition 23 =

23rd expedition to the International Space Station

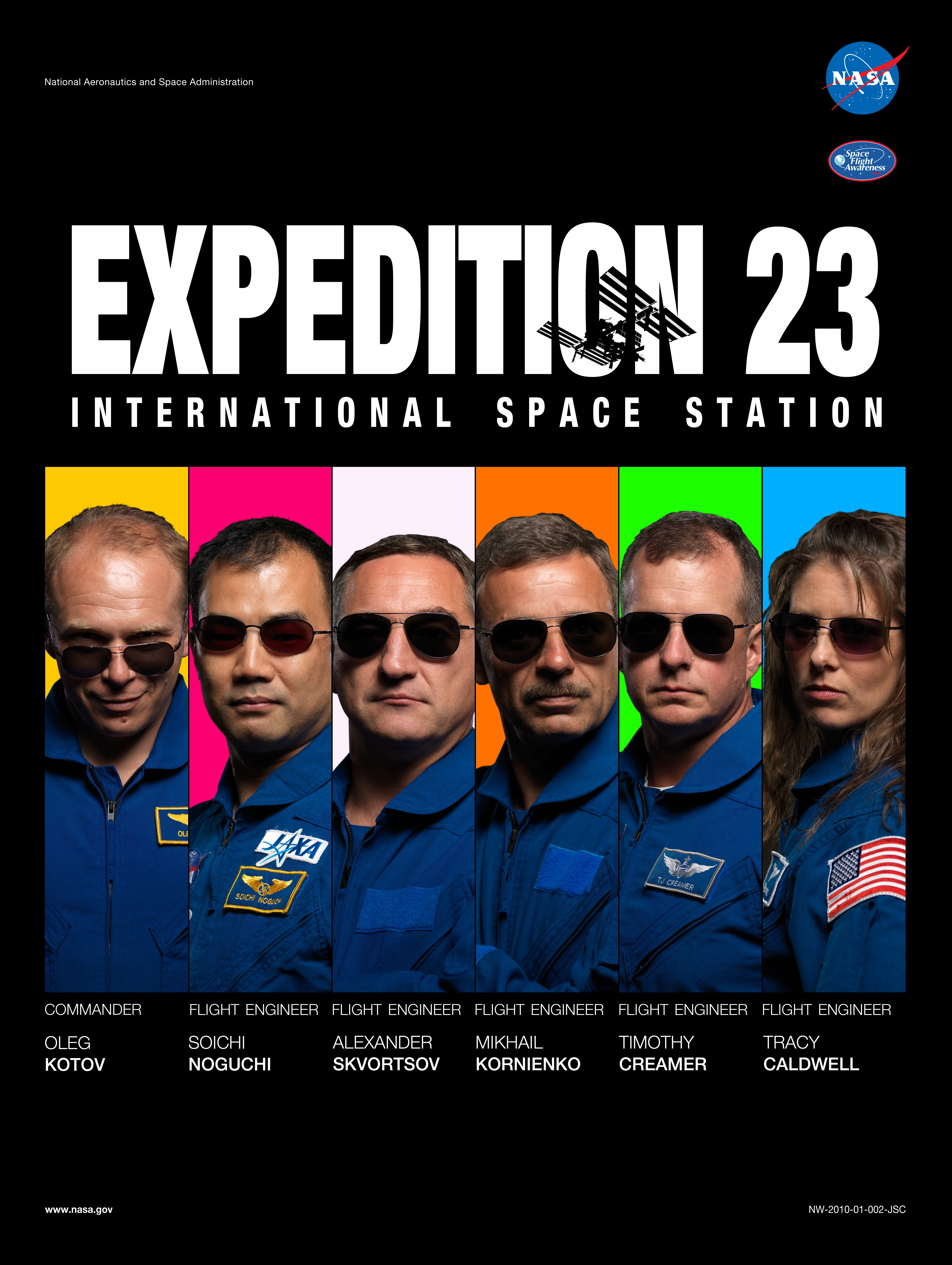
- Promotional Poster
- Mission type: Long-duration expedition
- Mission duration: 76 days, 16 hours, 1 minute

Expedition
- Space station: International Space Station
- Began: 18 March 2010, 08:03 UTC
- Ended: 2 June 2010, 00:04 UTC
- Arrived aboard: Soyuz TMA-17; Soyuz TMA-18
- Departed aboard: Soyuz TMA-17; Soyuz TMA-18

Crew
- Crew size: 6
- Members: Expedition 22/23: Oleg Kotov; Soichi Noguchi; Timothy Creamer Expedition 23/24: Aleksandr Skvortsov; Mikhail Korniyenko; Tracy Caldwell Dyson
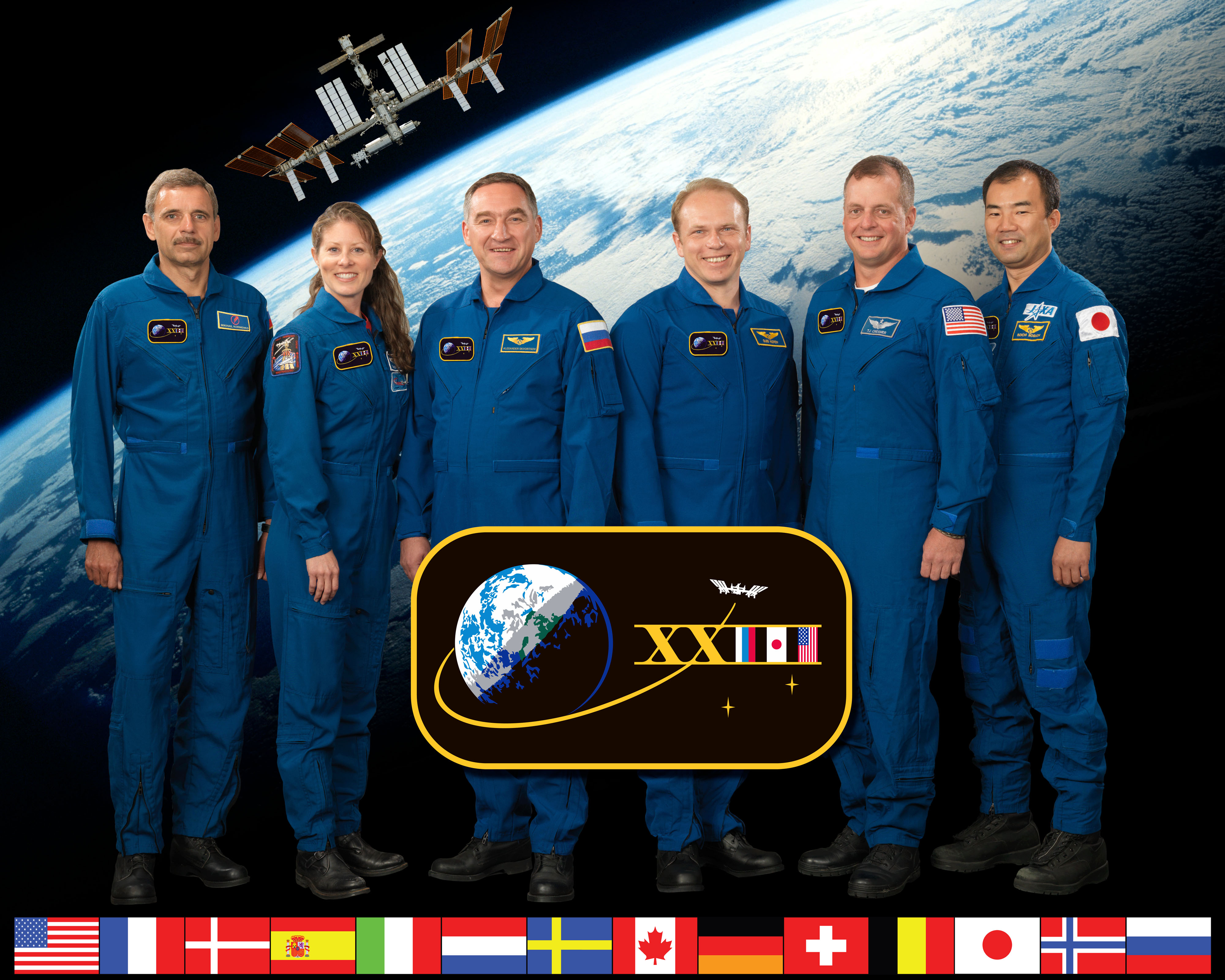
- Expedition 23 mission patch (l-r) Korniyenko, Caldwell Dyson, Skvortsov, Kotov, Creamer and Noguchi ISS expeditions

Expedition 23 (Russian: МКС-23) was the 23rd long-duration mission to the International Space Station (ISS). Expedition 23 began with the Soyuz TMA-16 undocking on 18 March 2010. Shortly thereafter cosmonauts Aleksandr Skvortsov and Mikhail Korniyenko and astronaut Tracy Caldwell Dyson arrived at the Space Station on Soyuz TMA-18 on 4 April 2010. The Soyuz spacecraft lifted off from the Baikonur Cosmodrome at 00:04 EST on 2 April 2010.

== Crew ==
Position	First part (March 2010 to April 2010)	Second part (April 2010 to June 2010)
Commander	Oleg Kotov, RSA; Second spaceflight	
Flight Engineer 1	(Japan) Soichi Noguchi, JAXA; Second spaceflight	
Flight Engineer 2	Timothy Creamer, NASA; Only spaceflight	
Flight Engineer 3		Aleksandr Skvortsov, RSA; First spaceflight
Flight Engineer 4		Mikhail Korniyenko, RSA; First spaceflight
Flight Engineer 5		Tracy Caldwell Dyson, NASA; Second spaceflight

Source
NASA

== Backup crew ==
- Douglas H. Wheelock – Commander
- Anton Shkaplerov
- Satoshi Furukawa
- Mikhail Tyurin
- Aleksandr Samokutyayev
- Scott J. Kelly

== Mission overview ==
Three Russian cosmonauts, two American and one Japanese astronauts made up the Expedition 23 crew. It was the first ISS crew to include three Russians at once. The Expedition 23 crew continued outfitting the newest modules of the nearly completed space station. The crew welcomed the shuttle flight STS-131 in April 2010. The Expedition 23 crew also saw the arrival of the Rasvet Russian docking module (MRM1) aboard Space Shuttle Atlantis on STS-132, which launched on 14 May 2010.

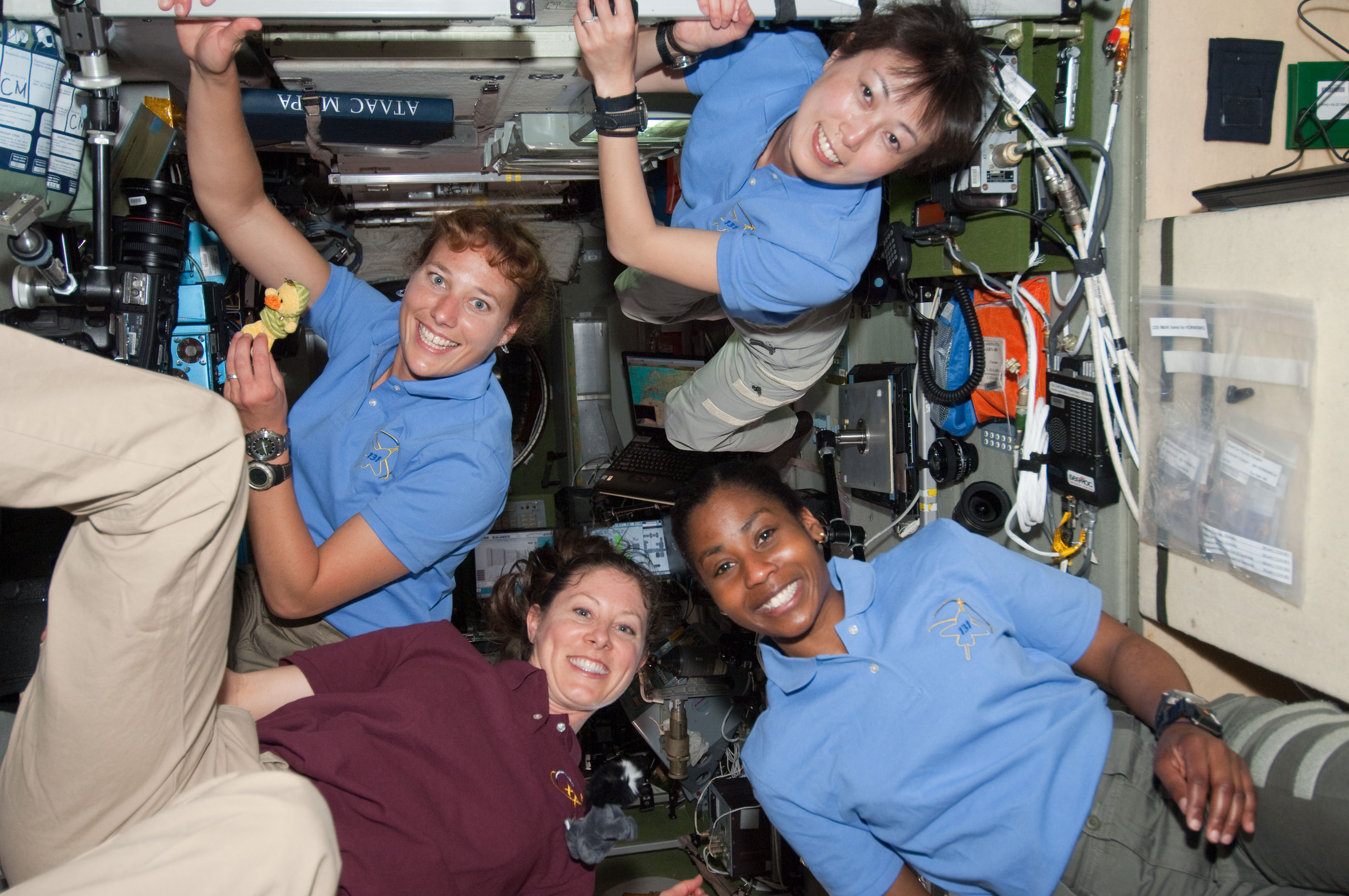
The three astronauts of STS-131 and Tracy Caldwell (bottom left) of ISS Expedition 23, the first time four women being at the same time in space.

== Gallery ==
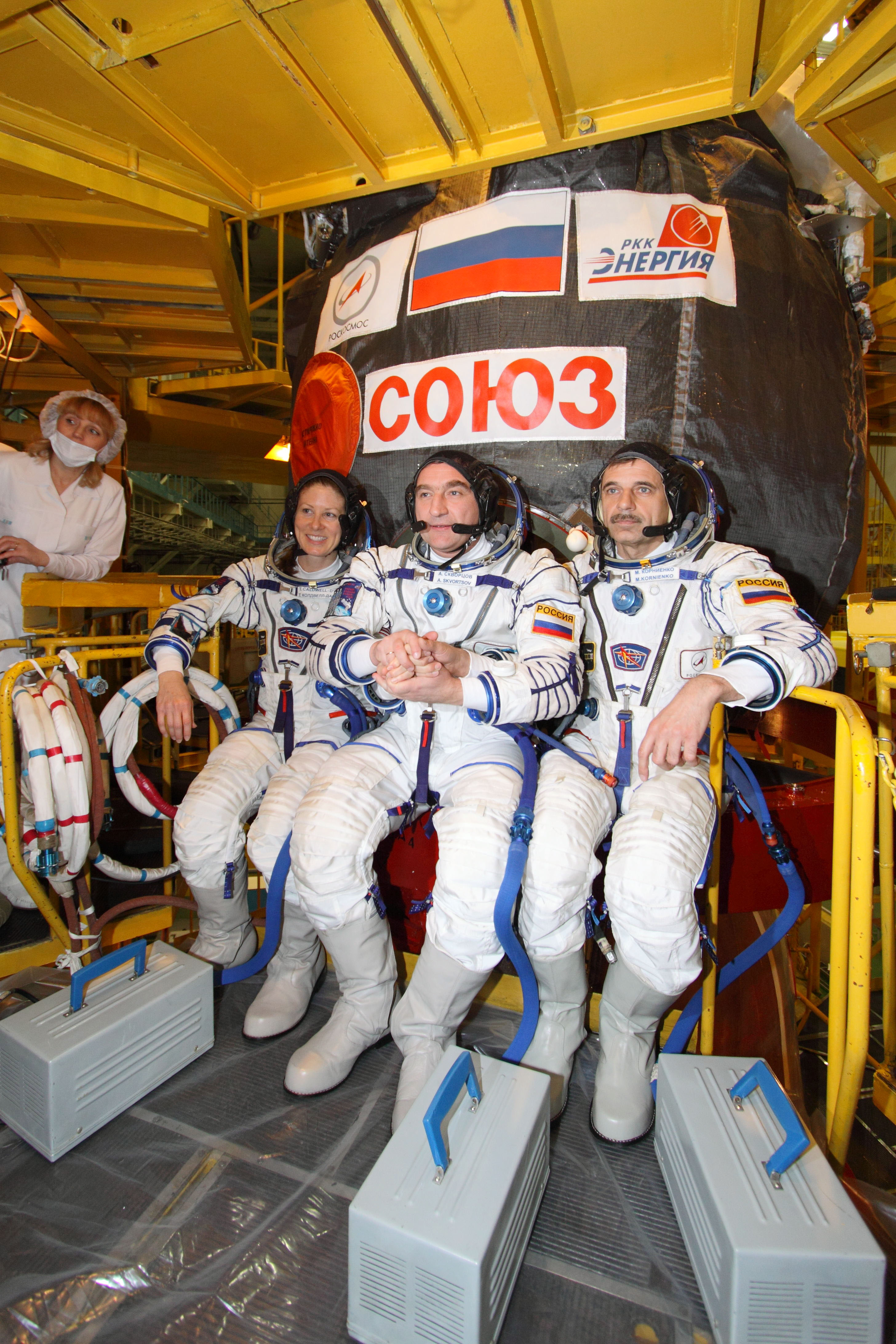
Caldwell Dyson, Skvortsov and Korniyenko in front of their Soyuz TMA-18 spacecraft.

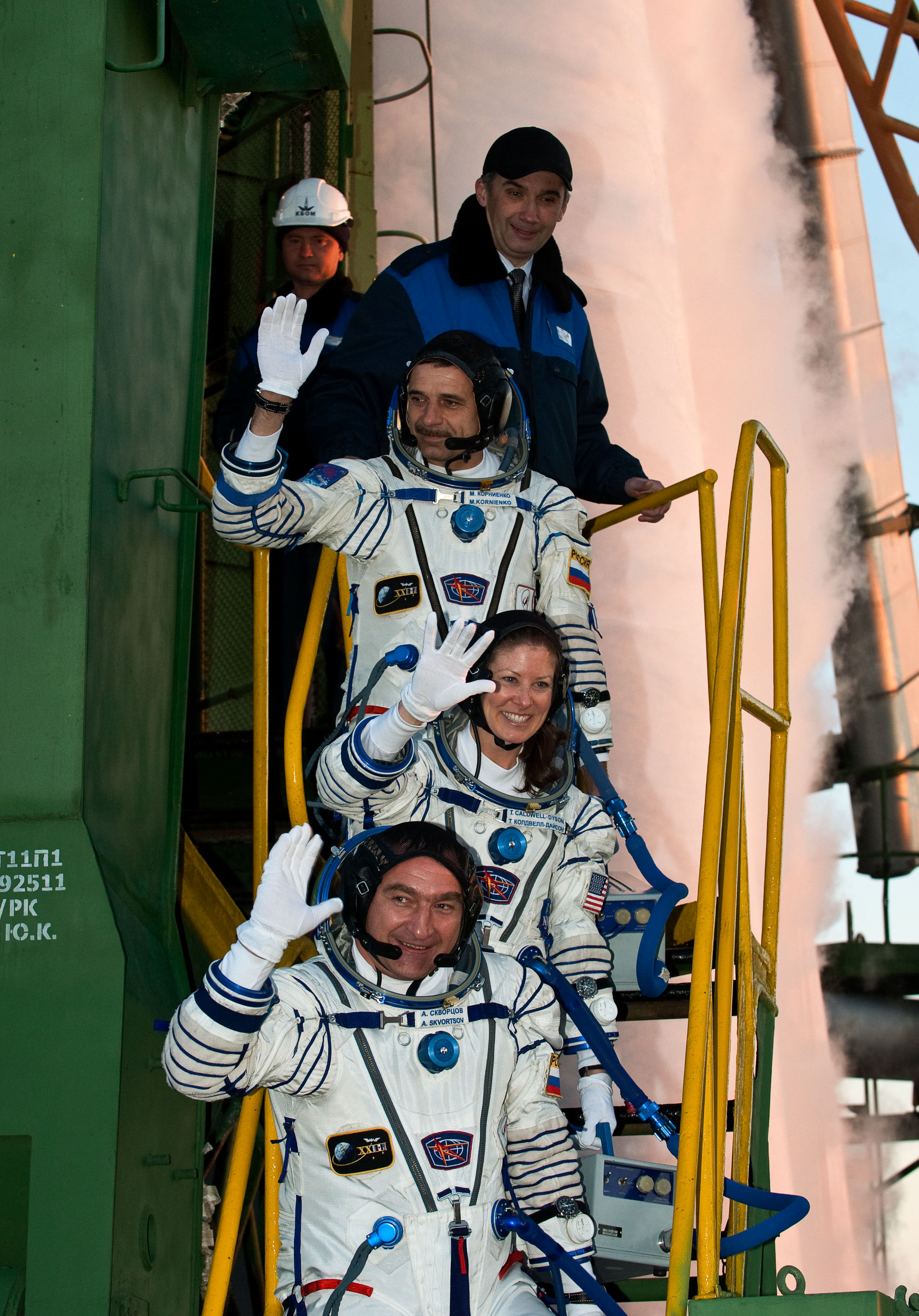
Skvortsov, Caldwell Dyson and Korniyenko wave farewell from the bottom of the Soyuz rocket.

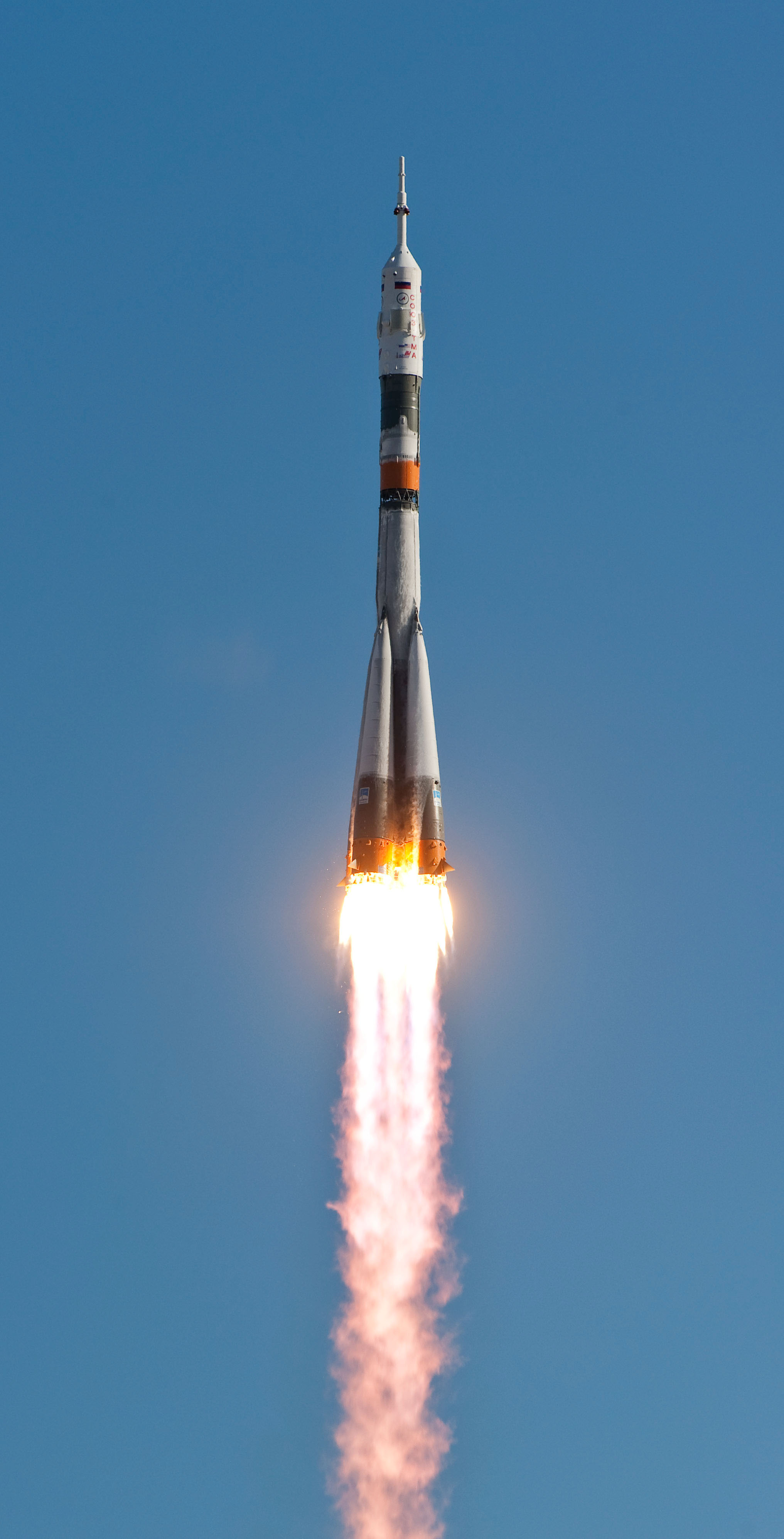
Soyuz TMA-18 launch from the Baikonur Cosmodrome.

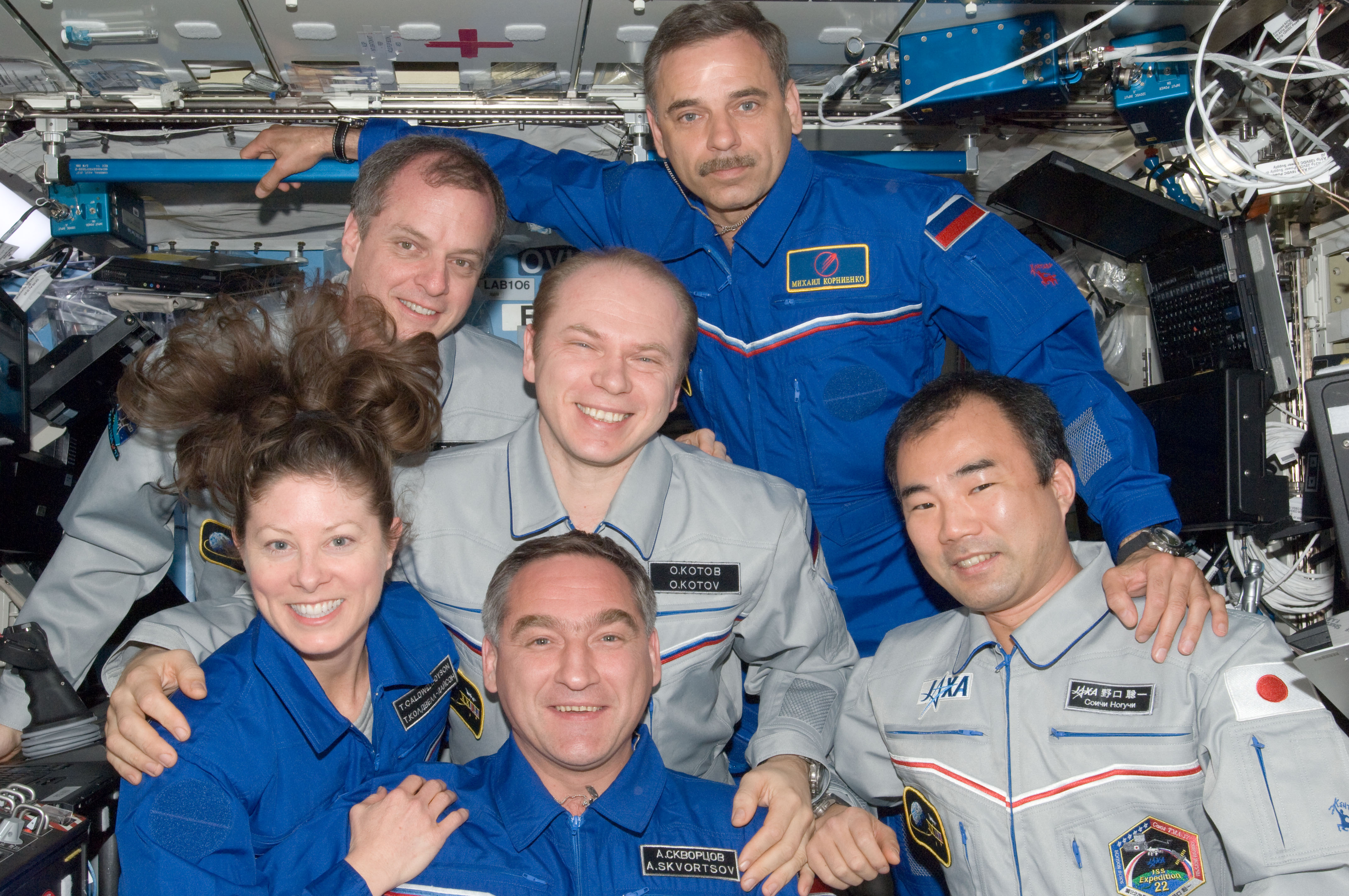
Expedition 23 crew members in the Destiny laboratory.

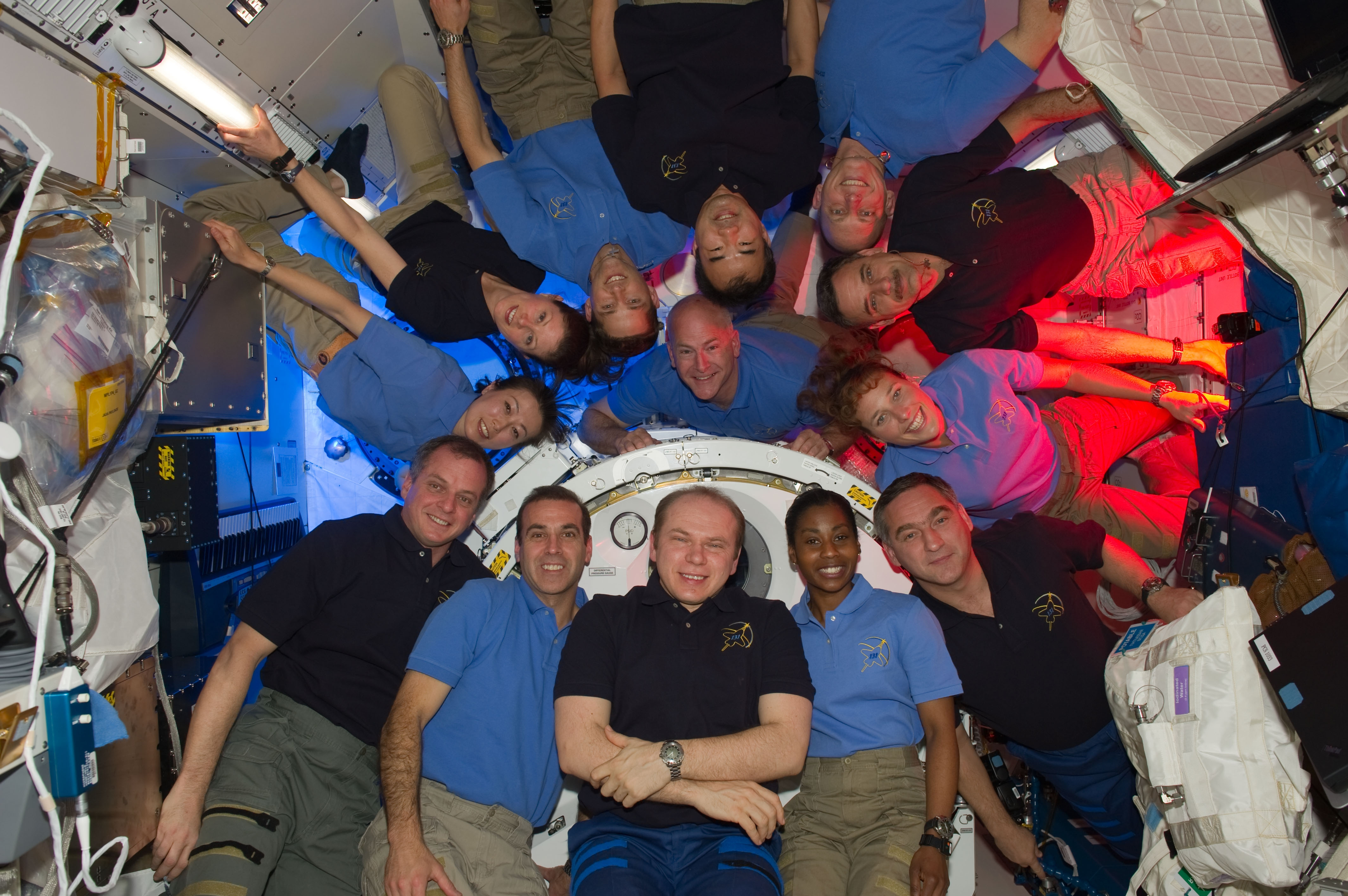
STS-131 & Expedition 23 group portrait.

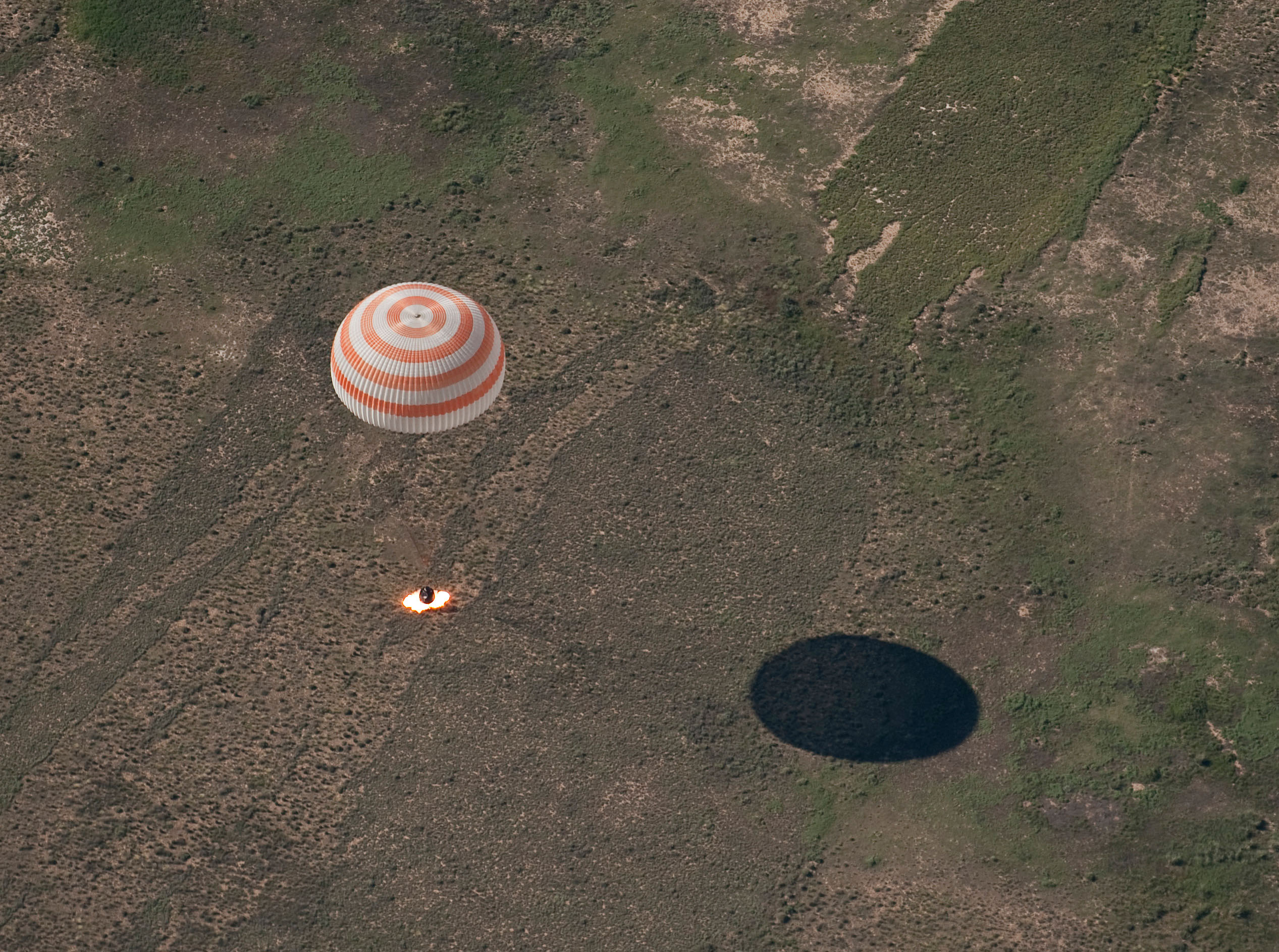
Expedition 23 lands.
