= List of human spaceflights, 2011–2020 =

This is a detailed list of human spaceflights from 2011 to 2020.

- Green indicates a suborbital flight (including flights that failed to attain intended orbit).

#	Crew	Launch spacecraft	Habitation	Return spacecraft	Brief mission summary
285	(United States) Steven Lindsey (5) (United States) Eric A. Boe (2) (United States) Nicole P. Stott (2) (United States) Benjamin A. Drew (2) (United States) Michael R. Barratt (2) (United States) Stephen G. Bowen (3)	24 February 2011 (United States) STS-133, Discovery	ISS	9 March 2011 (United States) STS-133, Discovery	ISS assembly and supply. Delivery of PLM. Delivery of Robonaut. Final mission of Discovery.
286	(Russia) Aleksandr Samokutyayev (1) (Russia) Andrei Borisenko (1) (United States) Ronald J. Garan (2)	4 April 2011 (Russia) Soyuz TMA-21	ISS (crew 27/28)	16 September 2011 (Russia) Soyuz TMA-21	ISS crew rotation.
287	(United States) Mark Kelly (4) (United States) Gregory H. Johnson (2) (United States) Michael Fincke (3) (Italy) Roberto Vittori (3) (United States) Andrew J. Feustel (2) (United States) Gregory E. Chamitoff (2)	16 May 2011 (United States) STS-134, Endeavour	ISS	1 June 2011 (United States) STS-134, Endeavour	ISS assembly and supply. Delivery of Alpha Magnetic Spectrometer. Delivery of ELC3. Final flight of Endeavour.
288	(Russia) Sergey Volkov (2) (Japan) Satoshi Furukawa (United States) Michael E. Fossum (3)	7 June 2011 (Russia) Soyuz TMA-02M	ISS (crew 28/29)	22 November 2011 (Russia) Soyuz TMA-02M	ISS crew rotation.
289	(United States) Christopher Ferguson (3) (United States) Douglas G. Hurley (2) (United States) Sandra Magnus (3) (United States) Rex J. Walheim (3)	8 July 2011 (United States) STS-135, Atlantis	ISS	21 July 2011 (United States) STS-135, Atlantis	ISS assembly and supply. Final flight of Atlantis. Final mission of the Space Shuttle.
290	(Russia) Anton Shkaplerov (1) (Russia) Anatoli Ivanishin (1) (United States) Dan Burbank (3)	14 November 2011 (Russia) Soyuz TMA-22	ISS (crew 29/30)	27 April 2012 (Russia) Soyuz TMA-22	ISS crew rotation.
291	(Russia) Oleg Kononenko (2) (Netherlands) André Kuipers (2) (United States) Donald Pettit (3)	21 December 2011 (Russia) Soyuz TMA-03M	ISS (crew 30/31)	1 July 2012 (Russia) Soyuz TMA-03M	ISS crew rotation.
292	(Russia) Gennady Padalka (4) (Russia) Sergei Revin (United States) Joseph M. Acaba (2)	15 May 2012 (Russia) Soyuz TMA-04M	ISS (crew 31/32)	17 September 2012 (Russia) Soyuz TMA-04M	ISS crew rotation.
293	(China) Jing Haipeng (2) (China) Liu Wang (China) Liu Yang (1)	16 June 2012 (China) Shenzhou 9	Tiangong 1	29 June 2012 (China) Shenzhou 9	Fourth human spaceflight, first crewed space station docking for China and first Chinese woman in space.
294	(Russia) Yuri Malenchenko (5) (United States) Sunita Williams (2) (Japan) Akihiko Hoshide (2)	15 July 2012 (Russia) Soyuz TMA-05M	ISS (crew 32/33)	19 November 2012 (Russia) Soyuz TMA-05M	ISS crew rotation.
295	(Russia) Oleg Novitskiy (1) (Russia) Evgeny Tarelkin (United States) Kevin A. Ford (2)	23 October 2012 (Russia) Soyuz TMA-06M	ISS (crew 33/34)	16 March 2013 (Russia) Soyuz TMA-06M	ISS crew rotation.
296	(Russia) Roman Romanenko (2) (Canada) Chris Hadfield (3) (United States) Thomas Marshburn (2)	19 December 2012 (Russia) Soyuz TMA-07M	ISS (crew 34/35)	14 May 2013 (Russia) Soyuz TMA-07M	ISS crew rotation.
297	(Russia) Pavel Vinogradov (3) (Russia) Alexander Misurkin (1) (United States) Christopher Cassidy (2)	28 March 2013 (Russia) Soyuz TMA-08M	ISS (crew 35/36)	11 September 2013 (Russia) Soyuz TMA-08M	ISS crew rotation.
298	(Russia) Fyodor Yurchikhin (4) (United States) Karen L. Nyberg (2) (Italy) Luca Parmitano (1)	28 May 2013 (Russia) Soyuz TMA-09M	ISS (crew 36/37)	11 November 2013 (Russia) Soyuz TMA-09M	ISS crew rotation.
299	(China) Nie Haisheng (2) (China) Zhang Xiaoguang (China) Wang Yaping (1)	11 June 2013 (China) Shenzhou 10	Tiangong 1	26 June 2013 (China) Shenzhou 10	Fifth human spaceflight and second crewed space station docking for China.
300	(Russia) Oleg Kotov (3) (Russia) Sergey Ryazansky (1) (United States) Michael S. Hopkins (1)	25 September 2013 (Russia) Soyuz TMA-10M	ISS (crew 37/38)	11 March 2014 (Russia) Soyuz TMA-10M	ISS crew rotation.
301	(Russia) Mikhail Tyurin (3) (United States) Richard Mastracchio (4) (Japan) Koichi Wakata (4)	7 November 2013 (Russia) Soyuz TMA-11M	ISS (crew 38/39)	14 May 2014 (Russia) Soyuz TMA-11M	ISS crew rotation.
302	(Russia) Aleksandr Skvortsov (2) (Russia) Oleg Artemyev (1) (United States) Steven Swanson (3)	25 March 2014 (Russia) Soyuz TMA-12M	ISS (crew 39/40)	11 September 2014 (Russia) Soyuz TMA-12M	ISS crew rotation.
303	(Russia) Maksim Surayev (2) (United States) Reid Wiseman (Germany) Alexander Gerst (1)	28 May 2014 (Russia) Soyuz TMA-13M	ISS (crew 40/41)	10 November 2014 (Russia) Soyuz TMA-13M	ISS crew rotation.
304	(Russia) Aleksandr Samokutyayev (2) (Russia) Yelena Serova (United States) Barry E. Wilmore (2)	25 September 2014 (Russia) Soyuz TMA-14M	ISS (crew 41/42)	12 March 2015 (Russia) Soyuz TMA-14M	ISS crew rotation.
305	(Russia) Anton Shkaplerov (2) (Italy) Samantha Cristoforetti (1) (United States) Terry W. Virts (2)	23 November 2014 (Russia) Soyuz TMA-15M	ISS (crew 42/43)	11 June 2015 (Russia) Soyuz TMA-15M	ISS crew rotation.
306	(Russia) Gennady Padalka (5)	27 March 2015 (Russia) Soyuz TMA-16M	ISS (crew 43/44)	12 September 2015 (Russia) Soyuz TMA-16M	ISS crew rotation.
306	(Russia) Mikhail Korniyenko (2) (United States) Scott Kelly (4)	27 March 2015 (Russia) Soyuz TMA-16M	ISS (crew 43/44/45/46)	2 March 2016 (Russia) Soyuz TMA-18M	ISS crew rotation.
307	(Russia) Oleg Kononenko (3) (Japan) Kimiya Yui (United States) Kjell N. Lindgren (1)	22 July 2015 (Russia) Soyuz TMA-17M	ISS (crew 44/45)	11 December 2015 (Russia) Soyuz TMA-17M	ISS crew rotation.
308	(Russia) Sergey Alexandrovich Volkov (3)	2 September 2015 (Russia) Soyuz TMA-18M	ISS (crew 45/46)	2 March 2016 (Russia) Soyuz TMA-18M	ISS crew rotation; First citizen of Kazakhstan (Aimbetov) and first Dane (Mogensen) in space.
308	(Denmark) Andreas Mogensen (Kazakhstan) Aidyn Aimbetov	2 September 2015 (Russia) Soyuz TMA-18M	ISS	12 September 2015 (Russia) Soyuz TMA-16M	ISS crew rotation; First citizen of Kazakhstan (Aimbetov) and first Dane (Mogensen) in space.
309	(Russia) Yuri Malenchenko (6) (United States) Timothy Kopra (2) (United Kingdom) Tim Peake	15 December 2015 (Russia) Soyuz TMA-19M	ISS (crew 46/47)	18 June 2016 (Russia) Soyuz TMA-19M	ISS crew rotation.
310	(Russia) Aleksey Ovchinin (1) (Russia) Oleg Skripochka (2) (United States) Jeffrey Williams (4)	18 March 2016 (Russia) Soyuz TMA-20M	ISS (crew 47/48)	7 September 2016 (Russia) Soyuz TMA-20M	ISS crew rotation.
311	(Russia) Anatoli Ivanishin (2) (Japan) Takuya Onishi (United States) Kathleen Rubins (1)	7 July 2016 (Russia) Soyuz MS-01	ISS (crew 48/49)	30 October 2016 (Russia) Soyuz MS-01	ISS crew rotation.
312	(China) Jing Haipeng (3) (China) Chen Dong (1)	16 October 2016 (China) Shenzhou 11	Tiangong 2	18 November 2016 (China) Shenzhou 11	Testbed mission for the Chinese to gain experience from an extended stay on a space laboratory and test its life-support systems.
313	(Russia) Sergey Ryzhikov (1) (Russia) Andrei Borisenko (2) (United States) Robert S. Kimbrough (2)	19 October 2016 (Russia) Soyuz MS-02	ISS (crew 49/50)	10 April 2017 (Russia) Soyuz MS-02	ISS crew rotation.
314	(Russia) Oleg Novitskiy (2) (France) Thomas Pesquet (1)	17 November 2016 (Russia) Soyuz MS-03	ISS (crew 50/51)	2 June 2017 (Russia) Soyuz MS-03	ISS crew rotation.
314	(United States) Peggy Whitson (3)	17 November 2016 (Russia) Soyuz MS-03	ISS (crew 50/51/52)	3 September 2017 (Russia) Soyuz MS-04	ISS crew rotation.
315	(Russia) Fyodor Yurchikhin (5) (United States) Jack D. Fischer	20 April 2017 (Russia) Soyuz MS-04	ISS (crew 51/52)	3 September 2017 (Russia) Soyuz MS-04	ISS crew rotation.
316	(Russia) Sergey Ryazansky (2) (Italy) Paolo Nespoli (3) (United States) Randolph Bresnik (2)	28 July 2017 (Russia) Soyuz MS-05	ISS (crew 52/53)	14 December 2017 (Russia) Soyuz MS-05	ISS crew rotation.
317	(Russia) Alexander Misurkin (2) (United States) Mark T. Vande Hei (1) (United States) Joseph M. Acaba (3)	12 September 2017 (Russia) Soyuz MS-06	ISS (crew 53/54)	28 February 2018 (Russia) Soyuz MS-06	ISS crew rotation.
318	(Russia) Anton Shkaplerov (3) (United States) Scott D. Tingle (Japan) Norishige Kanai	17 December 2017 (Russia) Soyuz MS-07	ISS (crew 54/55)	3 June 2018 (Russia) Soyuz MS-07	ISS crew rotation.
319	(Russia) Oleg Artemyev (2) (United States) Andrew J. Feustel (3) (United States) Richard R. Arnold (2)	21 March 2018 (Russia) Soyuz MS-08	ISS (crew 55/56)	4 October 2018 (Russia) Soyuz MS-08	ISS crew rotation.
320	(Russia) Sergey Prokopyev (1) (Germany) Alexander Gerst (2) (United States) Serena M. Auñón-Chancellor	6 June 2018 (Russia) Soyuz MS-09	ISS (crew 56/57)	20 December 2018 (Russia) Soyuz MS-09	ISS crew rotation.
—	(Russia) Aleksey Ovchinin (United States) Nick Hague	11 October 2018 (Russia) Soyuz MS-10			Aborted shortly after launch to the ISS due to second stage malfunction. Reached an apogee of 93 km, falling short of the Kármán line.
321	(Russia) Oleg Kononenko (4) (Canada) David Saint-Jacques (United States) Anne McClain	3 December 2018 (Russia) Soyuz MS-11	ISS (crew 57/58/59)	25 June 2019 (Russia) Soyuz MS-11	ISS crew rotation.
—	(United States) Mark P. Stucky (United States) Frederick W. Sturckow	13 December 2018; VSS Unity VP-03			Successful test flight for Virgin Galactic commercial fleet, in preparation for later space tourism operations. Apogee of 82.7 km did not pass the Kármán line but passed the US definition of space.
—	(Scotland) Dave Mackay (United States) Michael Masucci (United States) Beth Moses	22 February 2019; VSS Unity VF-01			First test passenger flight for Virgin Galactic commercial fleet, in preparation for later space tourism operations. The passenger, Beth Moses, is Virgin Galactic's Chief Astronaut Instructor and the first woman to fly aboard a commercial spaceship. Apogee of 89.9 km did not pass the Kármán line but passed the US definition of space.
322	(Russia) Aleksey Ovchinin (2) (United States) Nick Hague	14 March 2019 (Russia) Soyuz MS-12	ISS (crew 59/60)	3 October 2019 (Russia) Soyuz MS-12	ISS crew rotation.
322	(United States) Christina Koch	14 March 2019 (Russia) Soyuz MS-12	ISS (crew 59/60/61)	6 February 2020 (Russia) Soyuz MS-13	ISS crew rotation.
323	(Russia) Aleksandr Skvortsov (3) (Italy) Luca Parmitano (2)	20 July 2019 (Russia) Soyuz MS-13	ISS (crew 60/61)	6 February 2020 (Russia) Soyuz MS-13	ISS crew rotation.
323	(United States) Andrew R. Morgan	20 July 2019 (Russia) Soyuz MS-13	ISS (crew 60/61/62)	17 April 2020 (Russia) Soyuz MS-15	ISS crew rotation.
324	(Russia) Oleg Skripochka (3) (United States) Jessica Meir	25 September 2019 (Russia) Soyuz MS-15	ISS (crew 61/62)	17 April 2020 (Russia) Soyuz MS-15	ISS crew rotation; First Emirati person in space (Al Mansouri).
324	(United Arab Emirates) Hazza Al Mansouri	25 September 2019 (Russia) Soyuz MS-15	ISS (MBRSC)	3 October 2019 (Russia) Soyuz MS-12	ISS crew rotation; First Emirati person in space (Al Mansouri).
325	(Russia) Anatoli Ivanishin (3) (Russia) Ivan Vagner (1) (United States) Christopher Cassidy (3)	9 April 2020 (Russia) Soyuz MS-16	ISS (crew 62/63)	22 October 2020 (Russia) Soyuz MS-16	ISS crew rotation.
326	(United States) Doug Hurley (3) (United States) Bob Behnken (3)	30 May 2020 (United States) Crew Dragon Demo-2, Endeavour	ISS	2 August 2020 (United States) Crew Dragon Demo-2, Endeavour	First crewed test flight of SpaceX's Crew Dragon spacecraft.
327	(Russia) Sergey Ryzhikov (2) (Russia) Sergey Kud-Sverchkov (United States) Kathleen Rubins (2)	14 October 2020 (Russia) Soyuz MS-17	ISS (crew 63/64)	17 April 2021 (Russia) Soyuz MS-17	ISS crew rotation.
328	(United States) Michael Hopkins (2) (United States) Victor Glover (Japan) Soichi Noguchi (3) (United States) Shannon Walker (2)	15 November 2020 (United States) SpaceX Crew-1, Resilience	ISS (crew 64/65)	2 May 2021 (United States) SpaceX Crew-1, Resilience	ISS crew rotation.

== See also ==
- List of human spaceflight programs
- List of human spaceflights
- List of human spaceflights, 1961–1970
- List of human spaceflights, 1971–1980
- List of human spaceflights, 1981–1990
- List of human spaceflights, 1991–2000
- List of human spaceflights, 2001–2010
- List of human spaceflights, 2021–present
