= Expedition 53 =

53rd long duration stay in the International Space Station

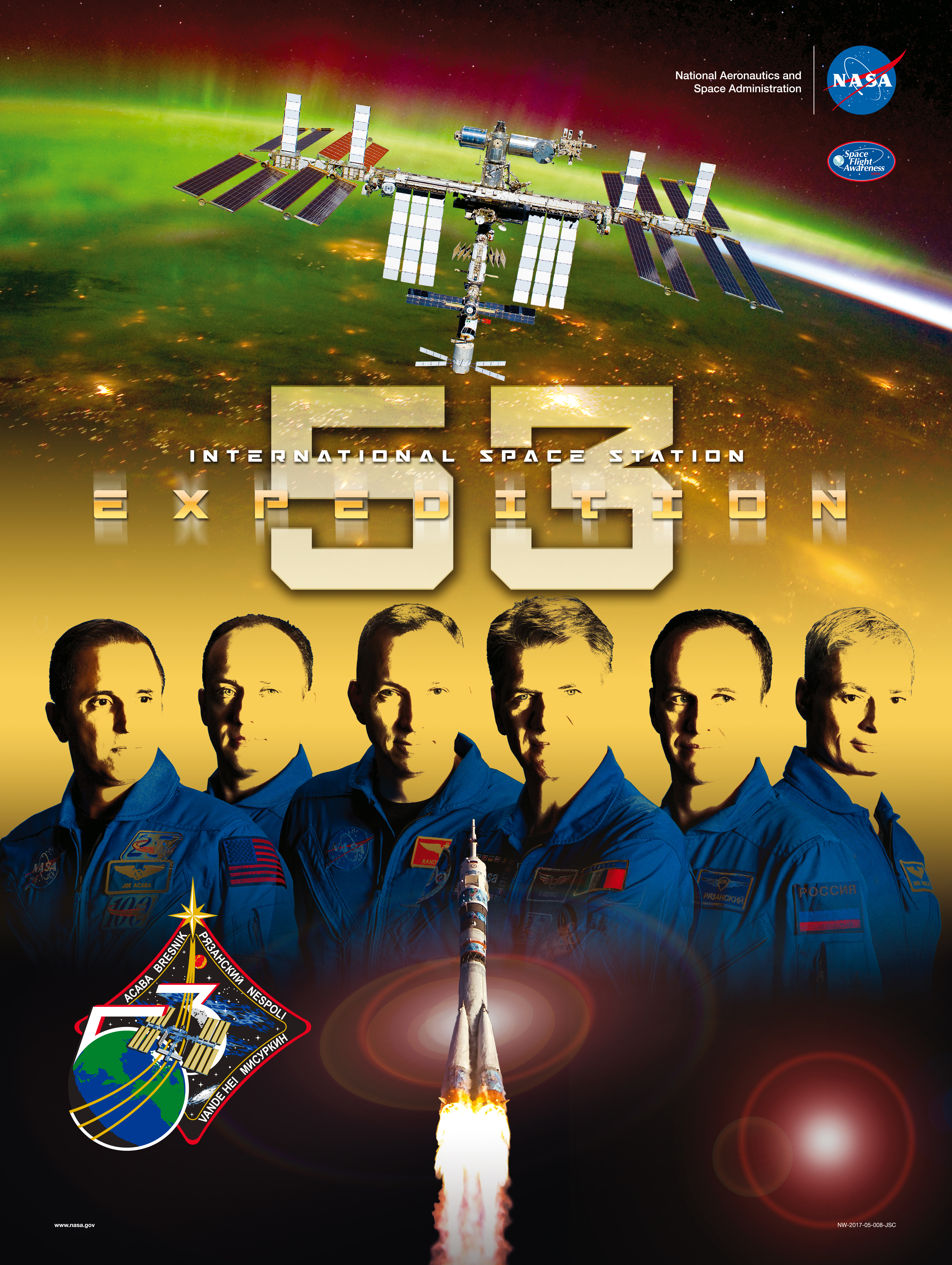
- Promotional Poster
- Mission type: Long-duration expedition

Expedition
- Space station: International Space Station
- Began: 2 September 2017
- Ended: 14 December 2017
- Arrived aboard: Soyuz MS-05; Soyuz MS-06
- Departed aboard: Soyuz MS-05; Soyuz MS-06

Crew
- Crew size: 6
- Members: Expedition 52/53: Sergey Ryazansky; Randolph J. Bresnik; Paolo Nespoli; Expedition 53/54: Alexander Misurkin; Mark T. Vande Hei; Joseph Acaba
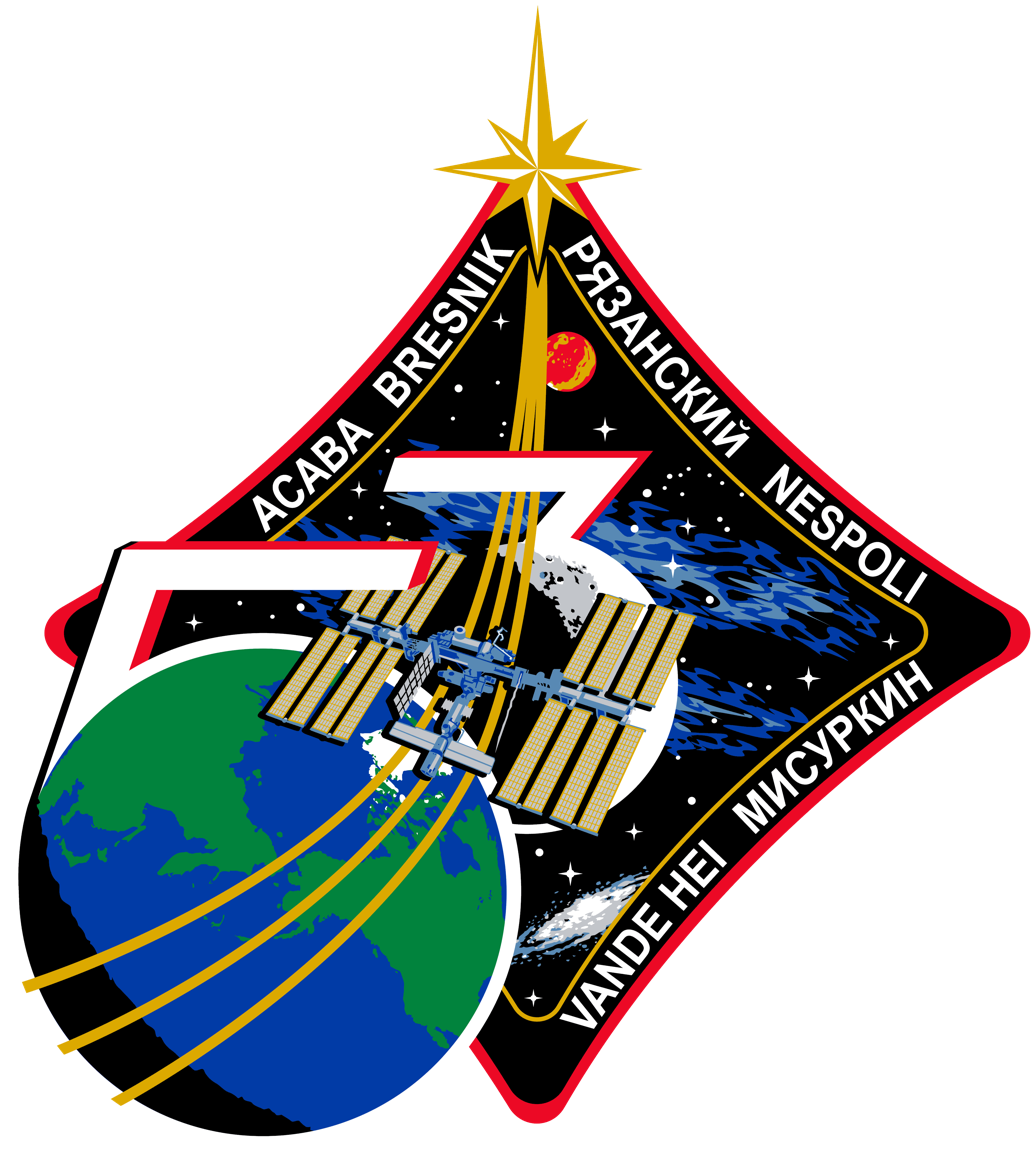
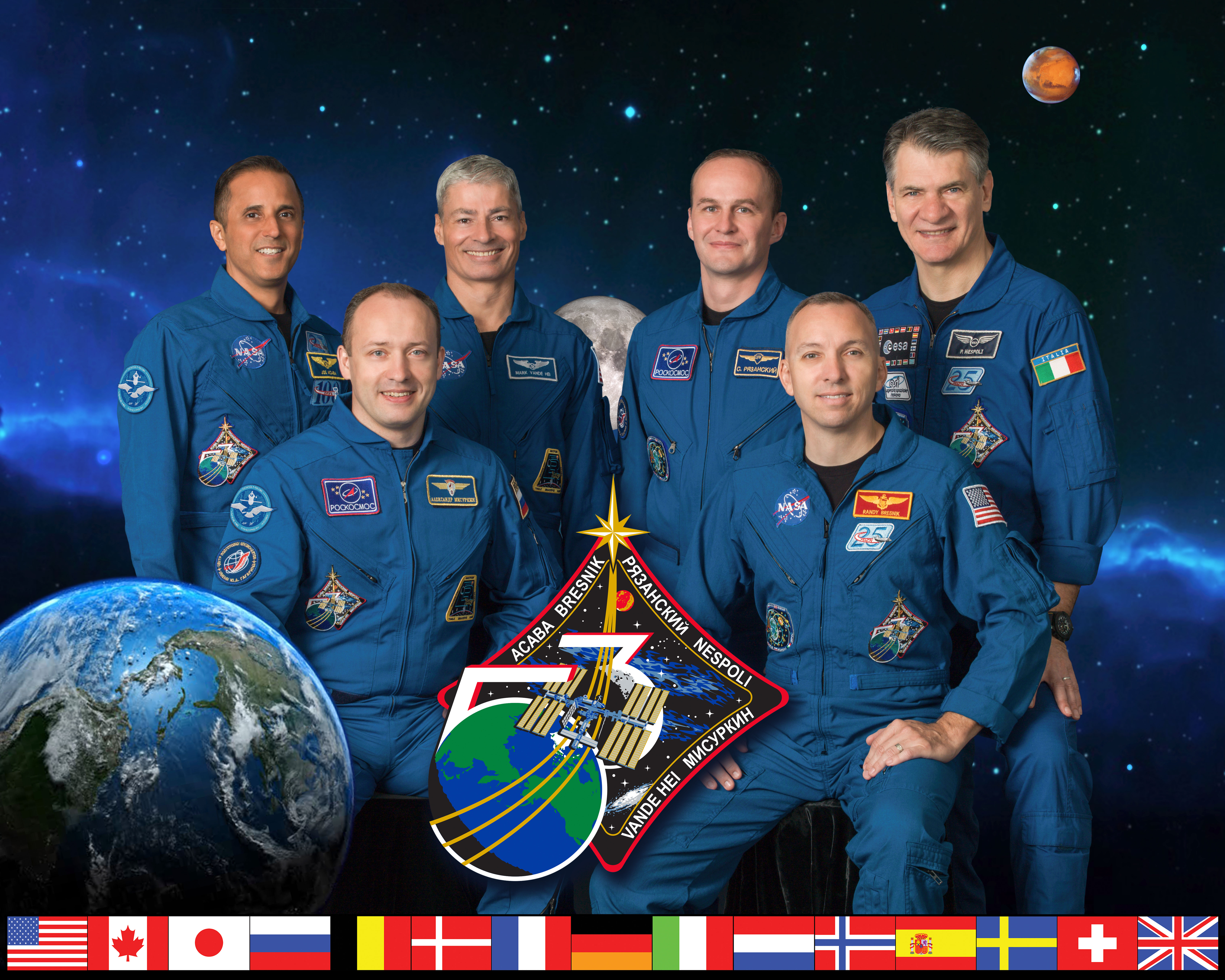
- Expedition 53 mission patch (l-r) Acaba, Misurkin, Vande Hei, Ryazansky, Bresnik and Nespoli ISS expeditions

Expedition 53 (September – December 2017) was the 53rd expedition to the International Space Station, which began upon the departure of Soyuz MS-04 on September 2, 2017, and concluded upon the departure of Soyuz MS-05 on December 14, 2017. Randolph Bresnik, Paolo Nespoli and Sergey Ryazansky were transferred from Expedition 52, with Randolph Bresnik taking the commander role. Transfer of Command from Expedition 53 to Expedition 54 was done on December 13, 2017. Expedition 53 officially ended on December 14, 2017 5:14 UTC, with the undocking of Soyuz MS-05.

== Crew ==
Position	First part (September 2 - September 13, 2017)	Second part (September 13 – December 14, 2017)
Commander	Randolph J. Bresnik, NASA; Second spaceflight	
Flight engineer	Sergey Ryazansky, RSA; Second and last spaceflight	
Flight engineer	Paolo Nespoli, ESA; Third and last spaceflight	
Flight engineer		Alexander Misurkin, RSA; Second spaceflight
Flight engineer		Mark T. Vande Hei, NASA; First spaceflight
Flight engineer		Joseph M. Acaba, NASA; Third spaceflight

In March 2017, after agreements with RSA, NASA announced that Joseph Acaba will be assigned to Expedition 53 and 54 crews, which previously included only Mark Vande Hei and Alexander Misurkin. Shannon Walker trained as a backup for Acaba.

== Mission overview ==
=== Expedition 52/53 launch and docking ===
Soyuz MS-05 launched on July 28, 2017, transporting Randy Bresnik, Sergey Ryazansky and Paolo Nespoli, who would make up the Expedition 52/53 crew. MS-05 docked with the Rassvet module six hours later.

=== September 2017 - Research Mission Started ===
==== Expedition 53/54 launch and docking ====
Soyuz MS-06 launched on September 13, transporting Alexander Misurkin, Mark T. Vande Hei and Joe Acaba. MS-06 docked with the (Poisk (MRM-2) module six hours later.

==== Dragon Brought Back ISS Experiments ====
On September 17, the SpaceX CRS-12 Dragon cargo spacecraft was released by Bresnick and Nespoli using the Canadarm2, clearing the Harmony module's docking port. It touched down in the Pacific Ocean southwest of Long Beach, California. It landed with the Lung Tissue Experiment, which grew lung tissue using stem cells in microgravity, the CASIS PCG7 study, which grew larger versions of the protein LRRK2 to help study Parkinson's disease, and mice from the Rodent Research-9 study, that looked at cartilage loss in hip and knee joints.

==== September research ====
Nespli and Ryazanskiy were the subjects of a bone marrow experiment that looked at the negative effects of microgravity on bone marrow and blood cells produced in bone marrow. Bresnik was the subject of a study on physiological changes due to microgravity, he is one of 33 astronauts that had signed on to participate in NASA's Biological Specimen Repository. Vande Hei worked on a camera for the Meteor experiment, which took high-resolution video and images of the Earth's atmosphere for space-based observations of meteor chemical composition. Acaba installed a Fast Neutron Spectrometer that had a better suited technique for measurements in mixed radiation fields. Ryazanskiy, Nespoli and Bresnik took measurements of themselves for Sarcolab-3, to investigate the deterioration of the calf muscle where it joins the Achilles tendon. Bresnik and Nespoli also tested out a Miniature Exercise Device-2 (MED-2) that used small robotic actuators to provide motion and resistance for crew workouts in a smaller package than previous exercise devices. Acaba setup hardware for the Veggie-3 experiment that grew Extra Dwarf Pak Choi, Amara Mustard and Red Romaine Lettuce to set the ground work to feed future long-duration missions to space. Ryazanskiy and Acaba installed radiation sensors on the U.S. portion of ISS to characterize the radiation environment aboard the station.

=== October 2017 - Three EVAs and a Progress ===
==== EVA 1 - Robotic Arm work ====
On October 5, Bresnik and Vande Hei completed a 6 hour and 55 minute spacewalk. They replaced of the two Latching End Effectors (LEE) on Canadarm2. They also were able to get ahead by removing insulation from a DC switching unit and preparing a flex hose rotary couple. This was Vande Hei's first spacewalk and Bresnik's third of their careers.

==== EVA 2 - Lubrication and camera fix ====
For their second spacewalk in less than a week, Bresnik and Vande Hei completed a 6 hour and 26 minute spacewalk on October 10. They lubricated the LEE they installed on October 5, replaced a faulty camera system, replaced a smudged lens cover and removed two handrails outside the Tranquility module. This would be Vande Hei's second space walk and final one of this mission.

==== Progress MS-07 resupply ====
After a scrubbed launch attempt on October 12, the Progress MS-07 resupply ship launched from Baiknour Cosmodrome on October 14 and docked with the station on October 16 about 252 miles over eastern China. The Progress had three tons of food, fuel and supplies for the station.

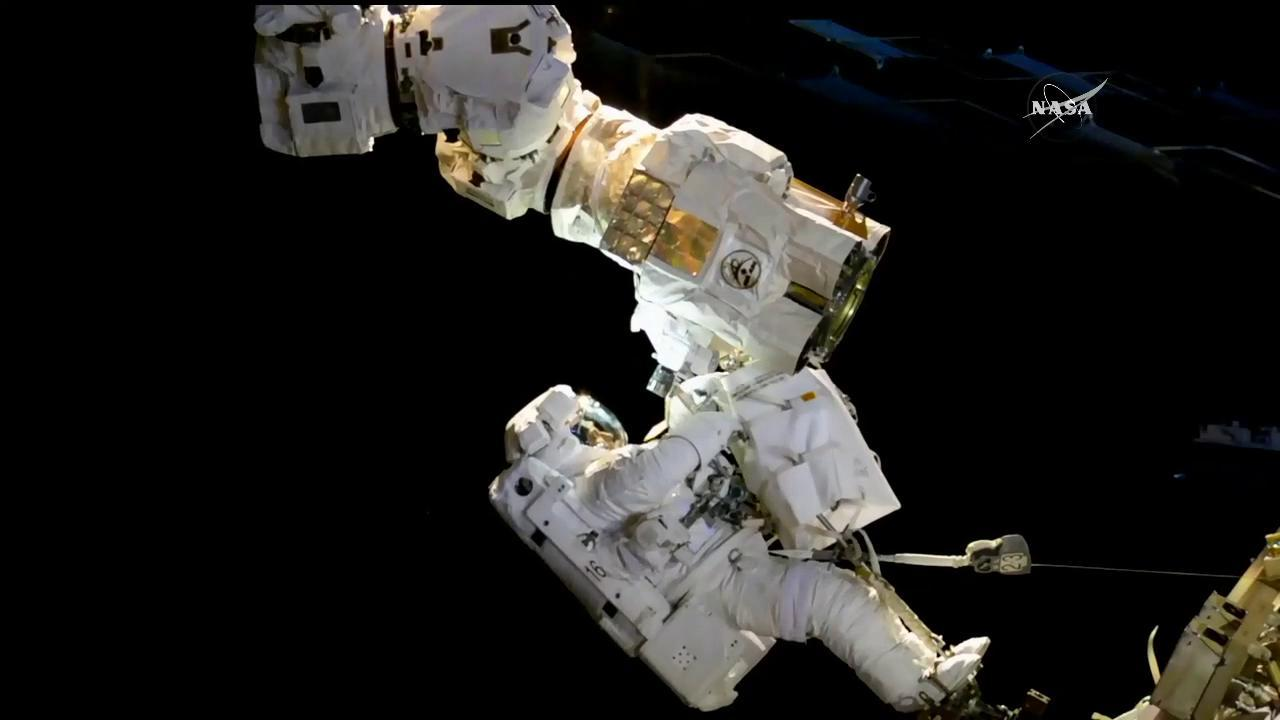
EVA 3 on October 20, 2017

==== EVA 3 - Canadarm2 camera install ====
On October 20, Bresnik and Acaba exited the station for their 3rd spacewalk of the mission. They installed a new camera system on the end of Canadarm2's LEE, an HD camera on the starboard truss of the ISS and replaced a fuse on the Dextre robotic arm. Bresnik also installed a new radiator grapple bar, prepped one of two spare pumps and started work on the second. This was Bresnik's 5th career spacewalk, bringing his total EVA hours to 32, and Acaba's third spacewalk, bringing his total hours to 19.

=== November 2017 - Science and Cygnus ===
==== Science ambassadors, space culture and research ====
Spoken voice of ESA astronaut Paolo Nespoli, talking about his space career, recorded on the ISS during the mission, for Wikipedia

In addition to their duties as researchers and maintenance technicians, astronauts Vande Hei and Acaba shared their science and technology studies with students from Shaker Heights High School in Cleveland, Ohio. The crew also documented life aboard the station for the CSA's study called "At Home in Space", testing a hypothesis that despite their different backgrounds, due to the isolation and confined environment of the ISS, astronauts share a common space culture. Vande Hei also setup gear to analyze the air in the space station for dust to highlight any health impacts and maintain crewmember well being. Nespli participated in a Fine Motor Skills study and how those motor skills are affected by a microgravity environment. To monitor microgravity vision impairment, Misurkin, Ryazanskiy, Nespoli and Vande Hei examined each other's eyes.

==== Cygnus CRS OA-8E "S.S. Gene Cernan" resupply ====
After a scrubbed launch attempt on November 11, the Cygnus resupply ship, named after Gene Cernan, launched atop an Orbital ATK Antares rocket on November 12 from the Wallops Flight Facility in Virginia. The spacecraft docked with the ISS on November 14 with 7,400 pounds of research and supplies. The Bigelow Expandable Activity Module (or BEAM) was outfitted in late November for future stowage operations by removing excess gear including inflations tanks and sensors. The old gear from BEAM and trash was placed into the Cygnus resupply ship for disposal. The spacecraft was detached from the station on December 5 by Vande Hei, Acaba and ground controllers.

=== December 2017 - Station handover to Expedition 54 ===
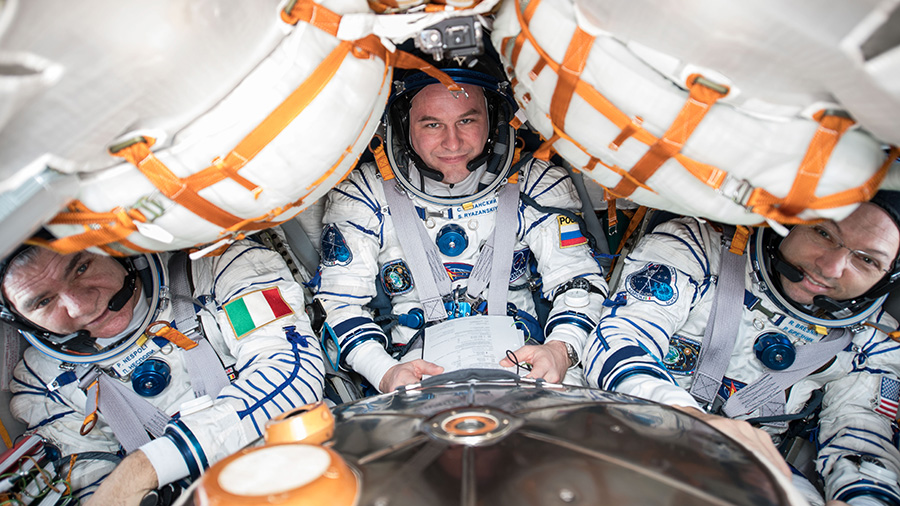
Expedition 53 crew (from left) Nespoli, Ryazanskiy and Bresnik aboard Soyuz MS-05

On December 13, with an official change of command ceremony, Expedition 53 Commander Randy Bresnik handed the station over to Expedition 54 Commander Alexander Misurkin. They undocked from the station on December 14, ending Expedition 53 and starting Expedition 54. They touched down later that day southeast of Dzhezkazgan in Kazakhstan. At the end of the mission, Bresnik had logged 150 days in space over two missions, Ryazanskiy had 306 days over two missions and Nespoli logged 313 days over three missions.

== Spacewalks ==
EVA #	Spacewalkers	Start (UTC)	End (UTC)	Duration
Expedition 53; EVA 1	Randy Bresnik; Mark T. Vande Hei	October 5, 2017; 12:05	October 5, 2017; 19:00	6 hours 55 minutes
Expedition 53; EVA 1	Replaced Latching End Effector (LEE-A) on Canadarm2, removed multi-layer insulation from a spare direct current switching unit, prepared a flex hose rotary coupler			
EVA 2	Randy Bresnik Mark T. Vande Hei	October 10, 2017 12:56	October 10, 2017 19:22	6 hours 26 minutes
EVA 2	Finished Repairs to Canadarm 2 added lubricating oil to all the working parts, Replaced the Station's Cameras which are used to film NASA TV, Installed Lens Covers, Closed and Locked a Latch on the High Pressure Gas Tanks, Rotated a Pump Module in preparation for relocating to P6 on a future spacewalk, Changed the Sockets on the degraded Latching End Effector and Reinstalled them on the new unit on Canadarm 2, Removed Handrails on Tranquility in preparation for installation of the EWS Antennas on a future spacewalk.			
EVA 3	Randy Bresnik Joseph M. Acaba	October 20, 2017 12:46	October 20, 2017 19:36	6 hours 49 minutes
EVA 3	Finished Repairs to Canadarm 2 added lubricating oil to all working parts and installed a camera and replaced a degraded one, Replaced the Station's Cameras which are used to film NASA TV, Replaced a Blown Fuse on Dextre, Removed MLI from two ORUs stored on ESP2 in preparation for them to be moved by Dextre later this year. Three get ahead task were performed by the crew MLI was removed from the Pump Modules on ESP2 Bresnik almost got the second one, but time expired and he had to close the flap on the second Pump Module it will be moved on the next spacewalk, Installed the Radiator Grapple Bars delivered on SpaceX CRS2.			

== Uncrewed spaceflights to the ISS ==
Resupply missions that visited the International Space Station during Expedition 53:

Spacecraft: ISS flight number	Country	Mission	Launcher	Launch (UTC)	Docked/Berthed (UTC) ^{†}	Undocked/Unberthed (UTC)	Duration (Docked)	Deorbit
Progress MS-07: ISS 68P	Russia	Logistics	Soyuz-2.1a	14 Oct 2017, 08:47:11	16 Oct 2017, 00:00	28 Mar 2018, 13:50	163d 13h 50m	26 Apr 2018, 04:08
Cygnus CRS OA-8E: CRS OA-8E	United States	Logistics	Antares 230	12 Nov 2017, 12:20:26	14 Nov 2017, 10:04	6 Dec 2017, 13:11	22d 3h 7m	18 Dec 2017, 12:54
