= Nikolai Tikhonov (cosmonaut) =

Soviet and Russian cosmonaut

Nikolay Tikhonov
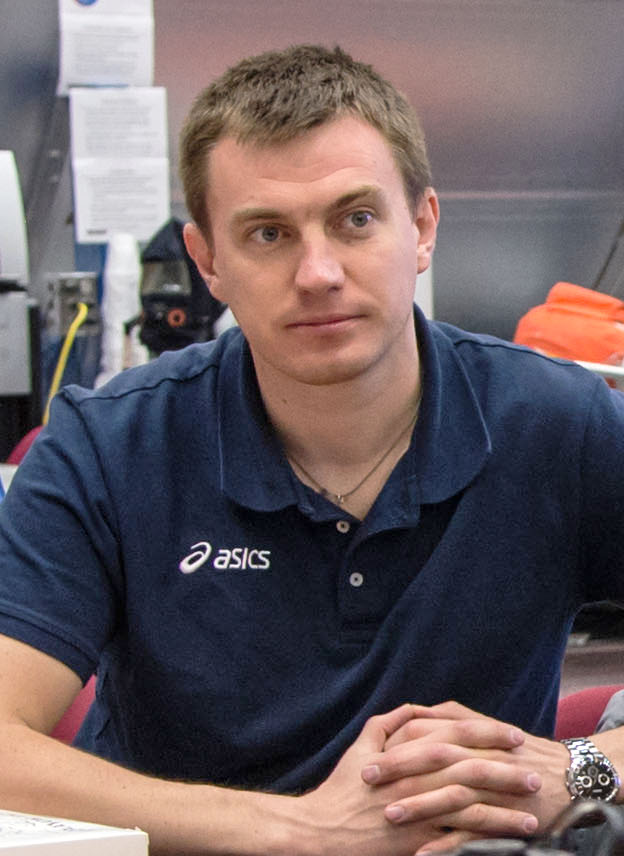
- Born: May 23, 1982 (age 44); Novomoskovsk, Russia SFSR
- Space career

RSA Cosmonaut
- Status: Retired (Jul 2020)
- Time in space: None
- Selection: 2006 RSA Group

Nikolay Vladimirovich Tikhonov (Russian Cyrillic: Николай Владимирович Тихонов; born May 23, 1982) is a retired Russian cosmonaut, selected in 2006. He was scheduled to make his first space flight in 2020, onboard Soyuz MS-16, but was removed for medical reasons.

== Cosmonaut career ==
After working as an engineer for RKKE, he was selected for cosmonaut training in 2006.

In 2013, Tikhonov served as cavenaut into the ESA CAVES training in Sardinia, alongside Soichi Noguchi, Andreas Mogensen, David Saint-Jacques, Andrew Feustel and Michael Fincke.

He was selected as a backup flight engineer for Soyuz MS-02. He was made a prime crew member of Soyuz MS-04 but, due to Russian budget cuts, the crews were changed and Tikhonov was then slated to make his first spaceflight on the Soyuz MS-10 spacecraft. He was again removed from the manifest due to delays in launching the Russian Nauka module. He was scheduled to fly into space as commander of the Soyuz MS-15 mission, although he was removed for a third time following the aborted launch of Soyuz MS-10, and the subsequent crew changes that followed. He was scheduled to finally make his first flight onboard Soyuz MS-16 in 2020, but ended up replaced for medical reasons.

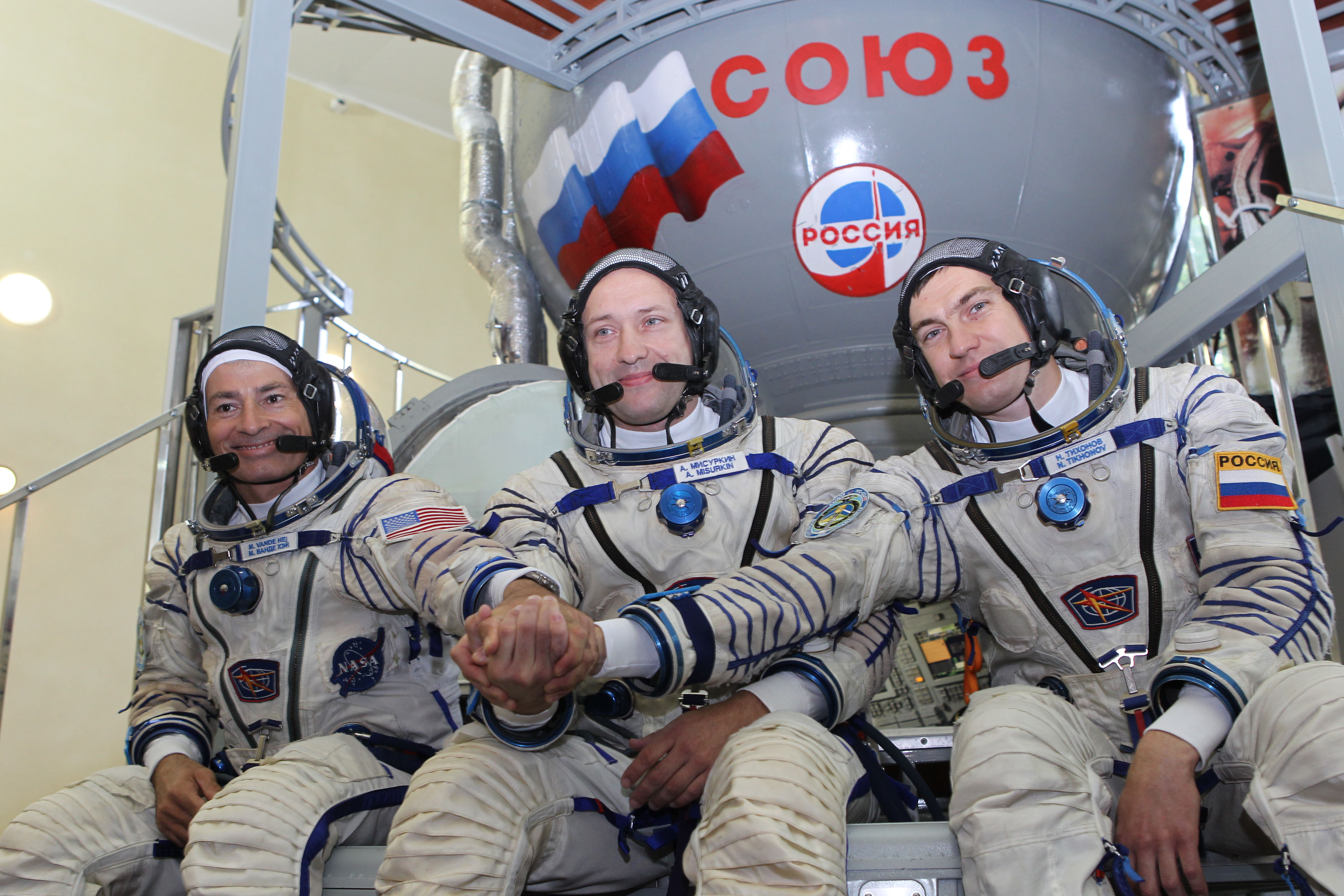
Tikhonov (right) as part of the Soyuz MS-02 backup crew.

In July 2020 it was reported he had left the cosmonaut corps "in connection with new data on his state of health".
