= Soyuz MS-04 =

2017 Russian crewed spaceflight to the ISS

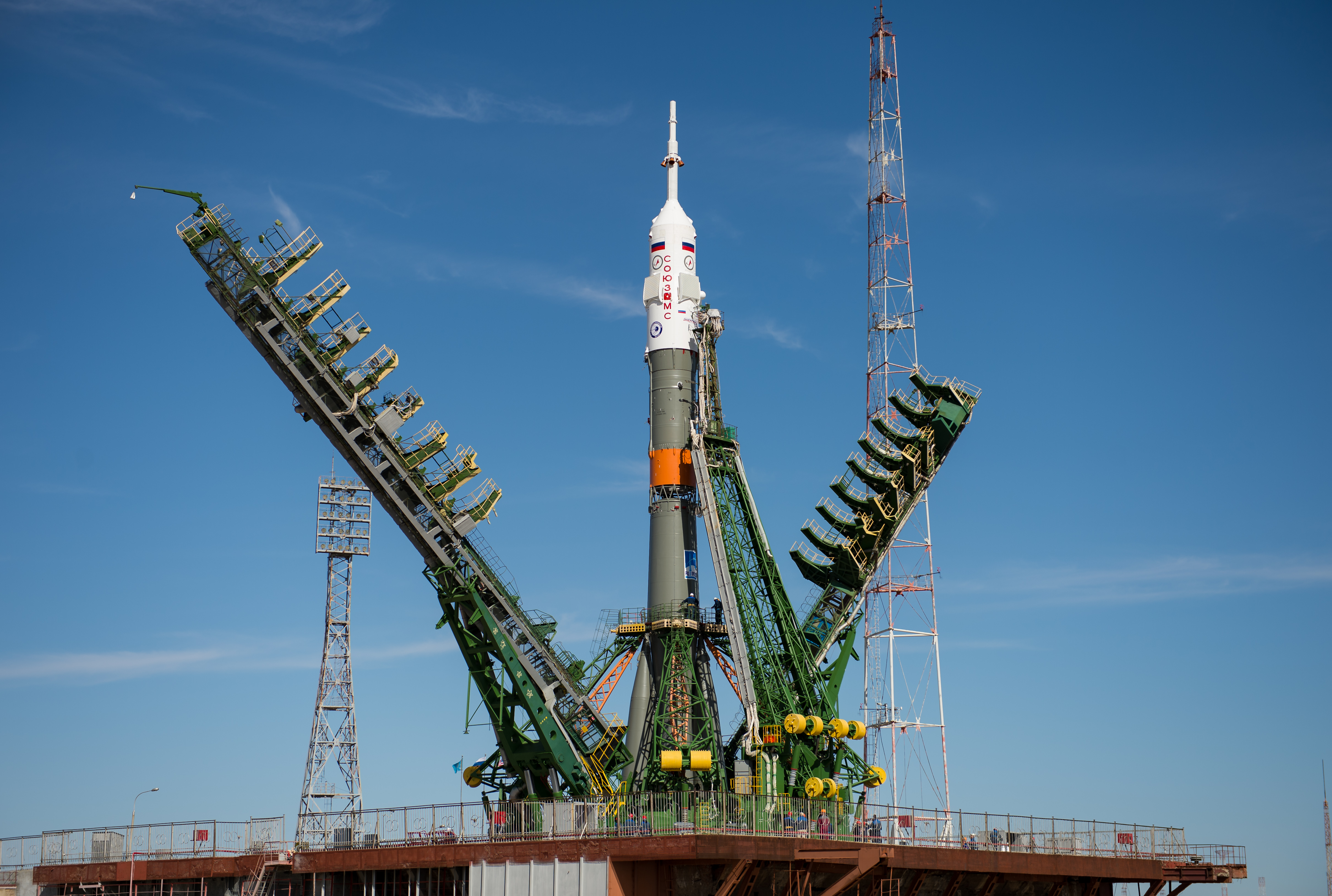
- Soyuz MS-04 prior to launch
- Mission type: ISS crew transport
- Operator: Roscosmos
- COSPAR ID: 2017-020A
- SATCAT no.: 42682
- Mission duration: 135d, 18h, 08m
- Distance travelled: 92.5 million kilometres
- Orbits completed: 2176

Spacecraft properties
- Spacecraft: Soyuz MS
- Spacecraft type: Soyuz MS 11F732A48
- Manufacturer: Energia
- Launch mass: 7080 kg

Crew
- Crew size: 2 (launching); 3 (landing)
- Members: Fyodor Yurchikhin; Jack D. Fischer
- Landing: Peggy Whitson
- Callsign: Olimp (Olympus)

Start of mission
- Launch date: 20 April 2017, 07:13:44 UTC
- Rocket: Soyuz-FG
- Launch site: Baikonur, Site 1
- Contractor: RKTs Progress

End of mission
- Landing date: 3 September 2017, 01:22 UTC
- Landing site: Steppes of the Kazakhstan

Orbital parameters
- Reference system: Geocentric orbit
- Regime: Low Earth orbit
- Inclination: 51.66°

Docking with ISS
- Docking port: Poisk zenith
- Docking date: 20 April 2017, 13:18 UTC
- Undocking date: 2 September 2017, 21:58 UTC
- Time docked: 135 days
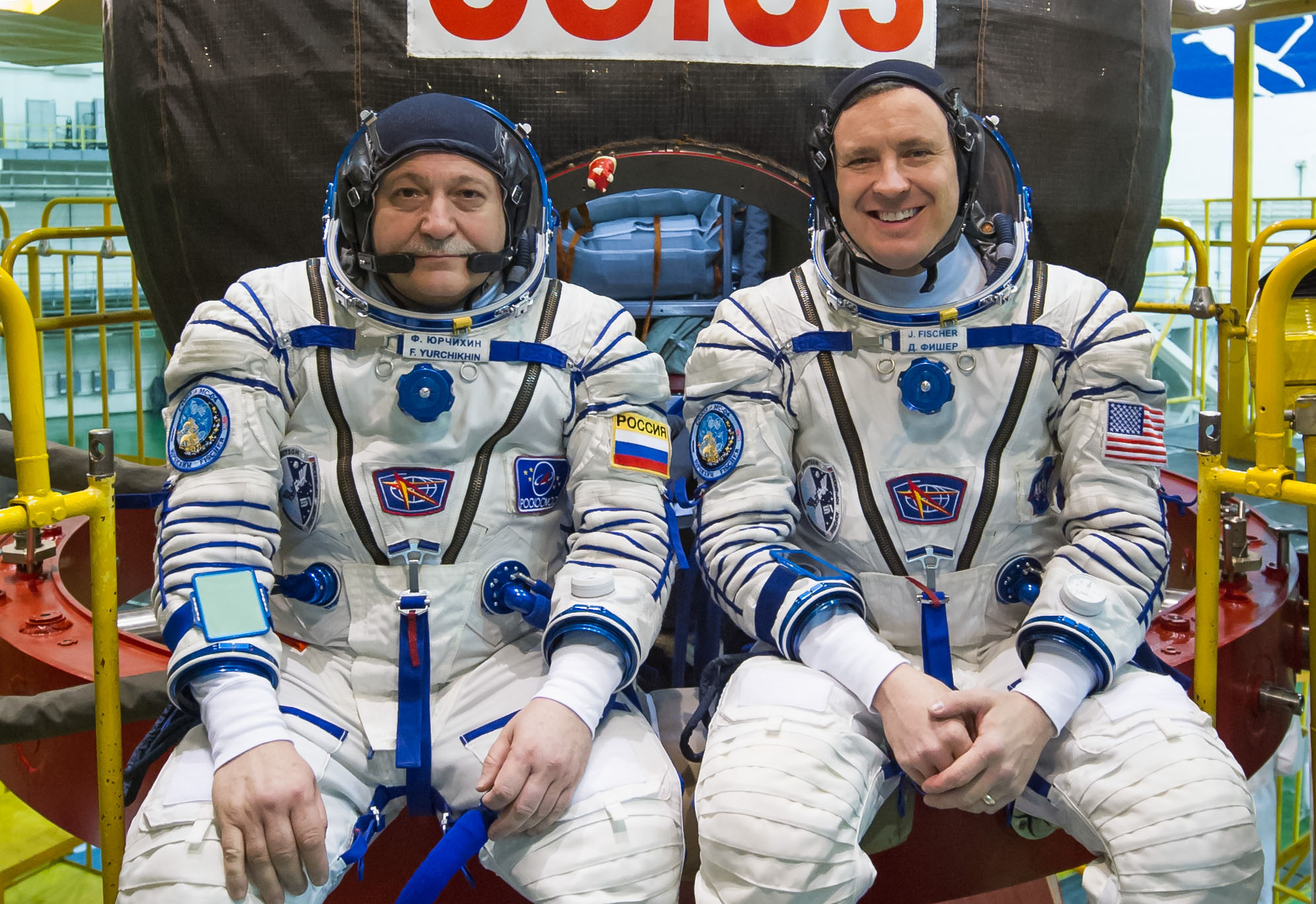
- Mission insignia Yurchikhin and Fischer in front of their spacecraft Soyuz programme (crewed)

Soyuz MS-04 was a Soyuz spaceflight that launched on 20 April 2017 to the ISS. It transported two members of the Expedition 52 crew to the International Space Station. Soyuz MS-04 was the 133rd flight of a Soyuz spacecraft. The crew consisted of a Russian commander and an American flight engineer. It was the first of the Soyuz MS series to rendezvous with the Station in approximately 6 hours, instead of the 2 day orbital rendezvous used for the previous launches. It was also the first Soyuz to launch with only 2 crew members since Soyuz TMA-2.

== Crew ==
Prime crew
Position	Launching crew	Landing crew
Commander	(Russia) Fyodor Yurchikhin, Roscosmos; Expedition 51; Fifth and last spaceflight	
Flight engineer	(United States) Jack D. Fischer, NASA; Expedition 51; Only spaceflight	
Flight engineer	None	(United States) Peggy Whitson, NASA; Expedition 50/51/52; Third (last NASA) spaceflight

Backup crew
Position	Crew
Commander	(Russia) Sergey Ryazansky, Roscosmos
Flight engineer	(United States) Randolph Bresnik, NASA

Due to a decision to cut down the number of participating Russian astronauts in 2017, only two astronauts were launched on Soyuz MS-04. Originally set to include 3 people, the crew assignments were changed in November 2016 by NASA and Roscosmos.

== Original crew ==
Position	Crew member
Commander	(Russia) Alexander Misurkin, Roscosmos; Expedition 51; Second spaceflight
Flight engineer	(Russia) Nikolai Tikhonov, Roscosmos; Expedition 51; First spaceflight
Flight engineer	(United States) Mark T. Vande Hei, NASA; Expedition 51; First spaceflight

Alexander Misurkin and Mark T. Vande Hei were reassigned to Soyuz MS-06 and served as part of Expedition 53/54, Nikolai Tikhonov was reassigned to Soyuz MS-10 to serve as part of Expedition 57/58 although was also pulled of that mission due to the same budget cuts.
