= Paolo Nespoli =

Italian astronaut and engineer (born 1957)

Paolo Nespoli OMRI
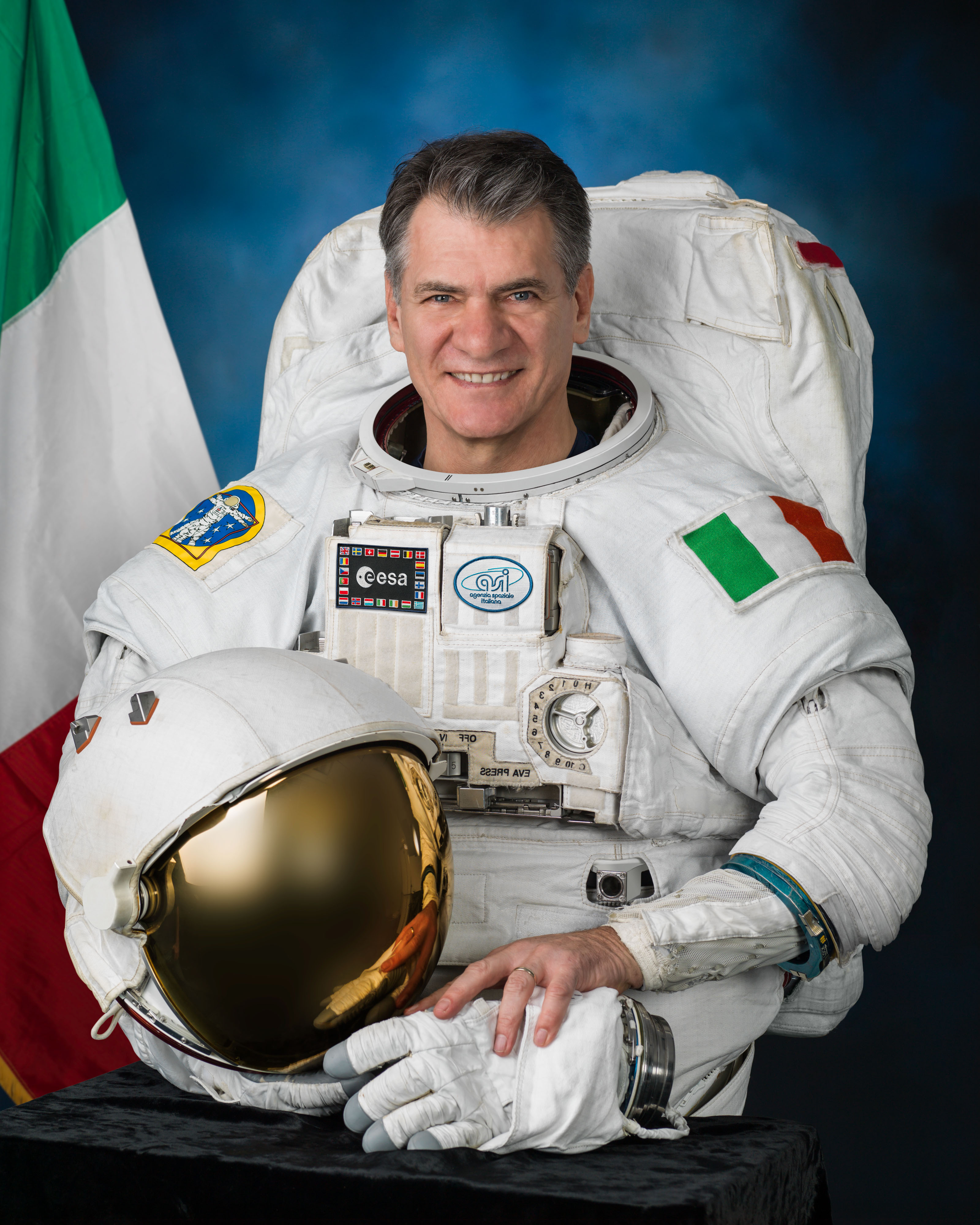
- Born: 6 April 1957 (age 69); Milan, Italy
- Occupation: Italian Army
- Space career

ESA astronaut
- Status: Retired
- Time in space: 313 days 2 hours 36 minutes
- Selection: 1998 ESA Group, NASA Group 17 (1998)
- Missions: STS-120, Soyuz TMA-20 (Expedition 26/27), Soyuz MS-05 (Expedition 52/53)
- Nespoli's voice Recorded aboard the ISS – the first content created in space specifically for use on Wikipedia. [Voice in his native language]

Major Paolo Angelo Nespoli (born 6 April 1957) is an Italian astronaut and engineer of the European Space Agency (ESA). In 2007, he first traveled into space aboard the Space Shuttle Discovery as a mission specialist of STS-120. In December 2010 he again traveled into space aboard the Soyuz TMA-20 spacecraft as an Expedition 26/27 flight engineer. Nespoli's third spaceflight was on board Soyuz MS-05, which launched in July 2017 for Expedition 52/53. He was also the European Space Agency's oldest active astronaut prior to his retirement in 2019.

== Personal ==
Nespoli's hometown is Verano Brianza, in northern Italy. He is married to Russian Alexandra Ryabova, and they have one daughter and a son. Nespoli enjoys Scuba diving, piloting aircraft, photography, and building electronic equipment and computer software. He supports Serie A team Inter.

== Education ==
He received his bachelor's degree in Aerospace engineering in 1988 and his master's degree in 1989 in Aeronautics and Astronautics from Polytechnic University in New York.

He is a professional engineer, a private pilot, an advanced scuba diver, and a nitrox diver. Due to his military background, he is also a master parachutist, parachute instructor, jump master, high altitude low opening and Special Forces operator in the 9th Paratroopers Assault Regiment. He joined the Italian Army in 1977.

== Awards ==
Nespoli has received the following awards:

- 2007 NASA Space Flight Medal
- 2007 Commendatore Ordine al Merito della Repubblica Italiana
- 2009 Cavaliere dell'Ordine della Stella della solidarietà italiana
- 2015 America Award of the Italy-USA Foundation

== Astronaut career ==
In July 1998, he was selected as an astronaut for Italian Space Agency (ASI) and in August 1998, Nespoli was assigned by the European Space Agency to train at NASA's Johnson Space Center in Houston, Texas.

In 2013, Nespoli served as cavenaut into the ESA CAVES training in Sardinia, alongside Jeremy Hansen, Michael Barratt, Jack Fisher, Aleksei Ovchinin and Satoshi Furukawa.

=== STS-120 ===
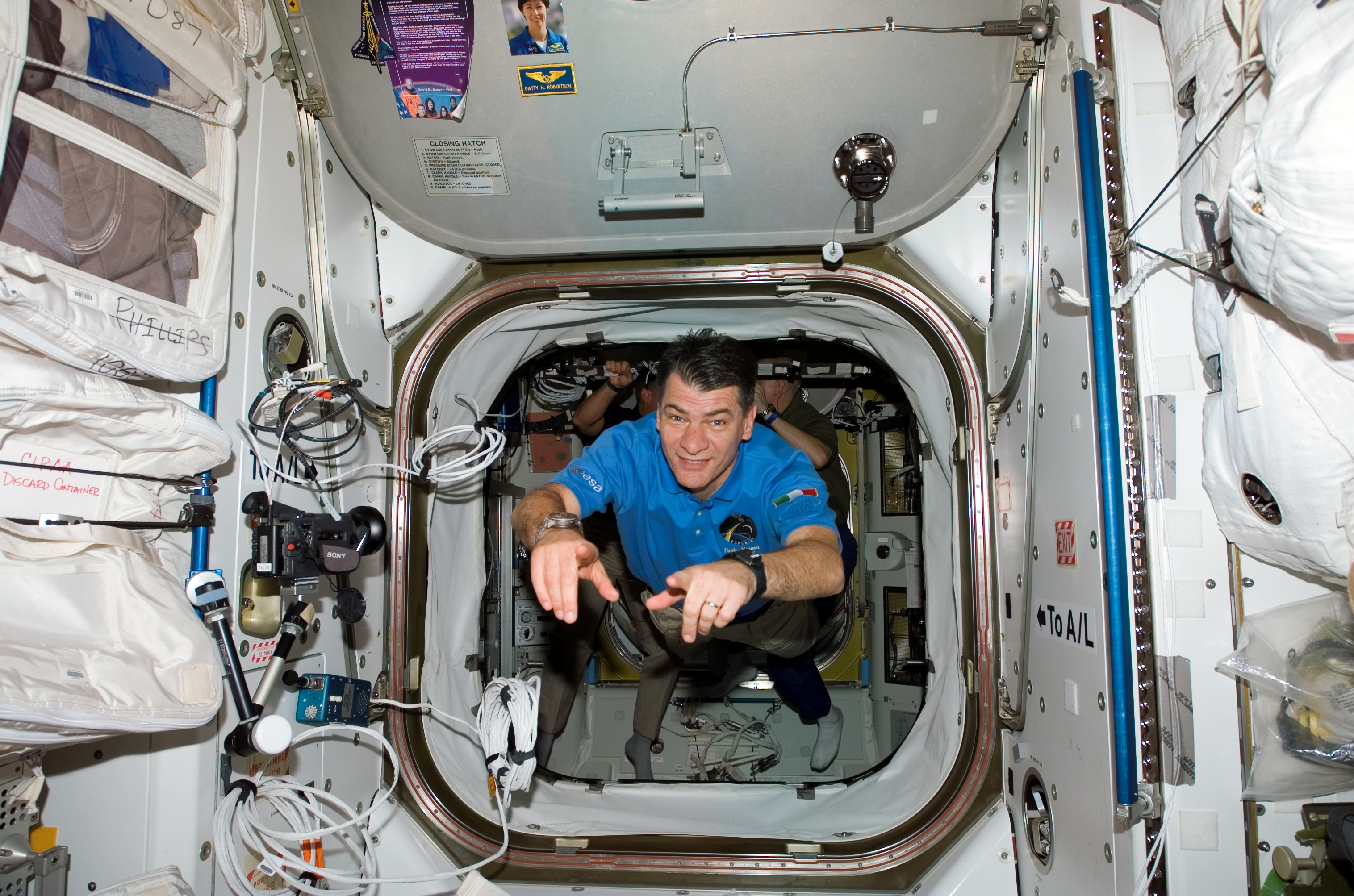
STS-120 mission specialist Paolo Nespoli in the International Space Station

On 23 October 2007 Paolo launched on board STS-120 to the International Space Station; the Space Shuttle mission which delivered the Harmony module (formerly known as Node 2) to the International Space Station. Harmony was built by Thales Alenia Space at its facility in Turin, Italy. He participated as a mission specialist and remained in space for 15 days, 2 hours and 23 minutes. During STS-120, he participated in the Esperia mission for the European Space Agency.

=== Expedition 26/27 'MagISStra' ===
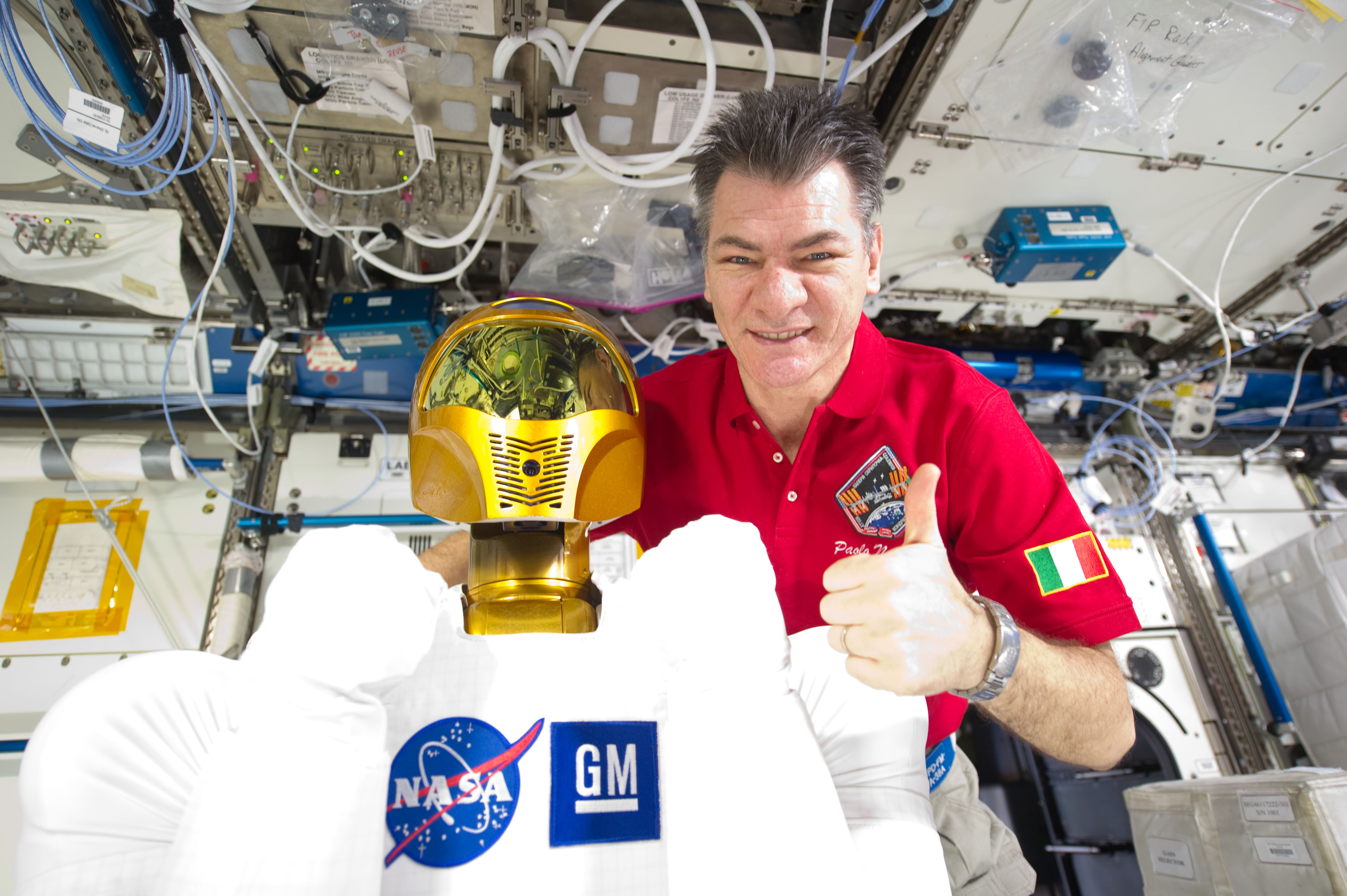
Expedition 26/27 flight engineer Paolo Nespoli poses with Robonaut 2.

Paolo Nespoli served as first flight engineer for Expedition 26/27, Europe's third six-month mission to the International Space Station (ISS).

On 15 December 2010 Nespoli flew aboard the Soyuz TMA-20 spacecraft from Baikonur Cosmodrome in Kazakhstan to the International Space Station with the Russian cosmonaut Dmitri Kondratyev and NASA's astronaut Catherine Coleman. The three members of the crew returned to Earth on 24 May 2011. This mission, dubbed ‘MagISStra’, is Paolo Nespoli's second flight in space.

From 15 December 2010 to 24 May 2011, Paolo Nespoli's duties aboard the ISS included participating in the docking operations to receive Europe's second Automated Transfer Vehicle (ATV-2) Johannes Kepler, a visiting spacecraft that will deliver essential cargo to the Station.

In early January, Nespoli filmed the majority of the footage for the 2011 documentary film First Orbit, and as a result is credited as its director of photography.

Nespoli took part in the arrival of the second Japanese HII Transfer Vehicle (HTV-2), an uncrewed spacecraft used to resupply the ISS. He was the prime operator for berthing the HTV-2 to the ISS after the free-flying vehicle was captured by NASA astronaut Catherine Coleman. In May 2011, Space Shuttle Endeavour has delivered the Alpha Magnetic Spectrometer (AMS-02) to the ISS.

During Nespoli's stint with Expedition 27, his mother, Maria, died on 4 May 2011. The crew observed 1 minute of silence the following day around the time of her funeral.

Paolo Nespoli carried out an intensive programme of experiments in the Station, ranging from radiation monitoring to measurements that could improve oil recovery in petroleum reservoirs. The mission scientific programme covered different fields on human research, fluid physics, radiation, biology and technology demonstrations.

Nespoli contributed to the scientific exploitation of Europe's Columbus laboratory. As an astronaut, he carried out several experiments for ESA, NASA and also the Japanese and Canadian space agencies. During the mission, Paolo participated in some educational activities: the educational programme "Mission X: Train Like an Astronaut" which gave children the chance to follow an international initiative built around health, well-being and nutrition. He also participated in a greenhouse activity in space. Nespoli used ESA's novel 3D camera to show images of the ISS.

As Paolo left the ISS on 23 May 2011 in the Soyuz TMA-20 he was able to take the first pictures of a Space Shuttle docked with the ISS from the perspective of a Russian Soyuz spacecraft.

=== Expedition 52/53 and the VITA mission ===
Nespoli was part of Expedition 52/53, which started in 2017. He launched on Soyuz MS-05 on 28 July 2017 15:41 UTC. Nespoli's mission to the ISS was called VITA. Vita is an acronym for Vitality, Innovation, Technology and Ability. In addition, in Italian it means life, reflecting the scientific experiments and the technologies needed for life in space. Additional activities included outreach like Mission-X: Train Like an Astronaut, the European Astro Pi Challenge (where European students run their own code on Raspberry Pi mini computers installed on the ISS).

==== VITA mission logo ====
The mission's logo was developed and created jointly by ESA, Italian Space Agency, and Nespoli. The overall circle represent the planet Earth, with the main objectives linked by a symbol which is a reformulation of the infinity symbol, called "Third paradise" and designed by Michelangelo Pistoletto. Connected inside are a DNA strand for the scientific experiments, a book for education, outreach and culture, and Earth as a symbol of humanity. The colors represent the Italian flag.

==== Mission highlights ====
During the VITA Mission Nespoli completed more than 60 experiments. He also recorded the first content created in space specifically for use on Wikipedia. During his first month in orbit Nespoli acted as cinematographer for National Geographic Channel's One Strange Rock, filming the sequences with astronaut Peggy Whitson which appear in episode 10 of the series.

Nespoli returned to Earth on 14 December 2017. The Soyuz MS-05 landed at 8:38 UTC, giving a mission duration of 138 days, 16 hours, 56 minutes and 37 seconds.
