= Jack D. Fischer =

American astronaut (born 1974)

Jack Fischer
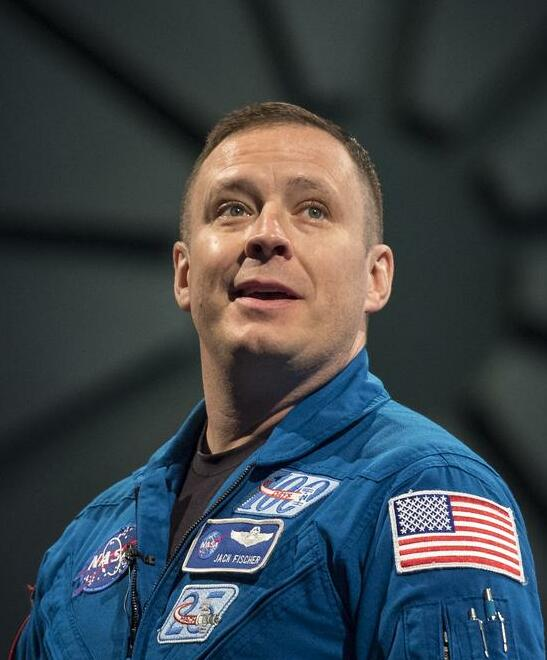
- Fisher at the National Air and Space Museum in 2017
- Born: Jack David Fischer; January 23, 1974 (age 52); Louisville, Colorado, U.S.
- Education: United States Air Force Academy (BS); Massachusetts Institute of Technology (MS)
- Space career

NASA astronaut
- Rank: Colonel, USAF
- Time in space: 135d 18h 8m
- Selection: NASA Group 20 (2009)
- Total EVAs: 2
- Total EVA time: 6h 54m
- Missions: Soyuz MS-04 (Expedition 51/52)
- Mission insignia

Jack David Fischer (born January 23, 1974) is an American engineer, test pilot and a former NASA astronaut. Fischer was selected in June 2009 as a member of the NASA Astronaut Group 20 and qualified as an astronaut in 2011. He made his first spaceflight in April 2017, as a flight engineer for Expedition 51/52 on the International Space Station.

== Personal ==
Fischer was born January 23, 1974, in Louisville, Colorado. He is married to Elizabeth Simonson from Boulder, Colorado. They have two daughters. Fischer's father, Gary Fischer, is deceased, and his mother, JoBelle Fischer, still lives near Louisville, Colorado.

== Education ==
In 1992, he graduated from Centaurus High School, in Lafayette, Colorado. He received his Bachelor of Science degree in Astronautical Engineering at the U.S. Air Force Academy in 1996. He completed a Master of Science degree in Aeronautics and Astronautics at the Massachusetts Institute of Technology in 1998.

== U.S. Air Force service ==
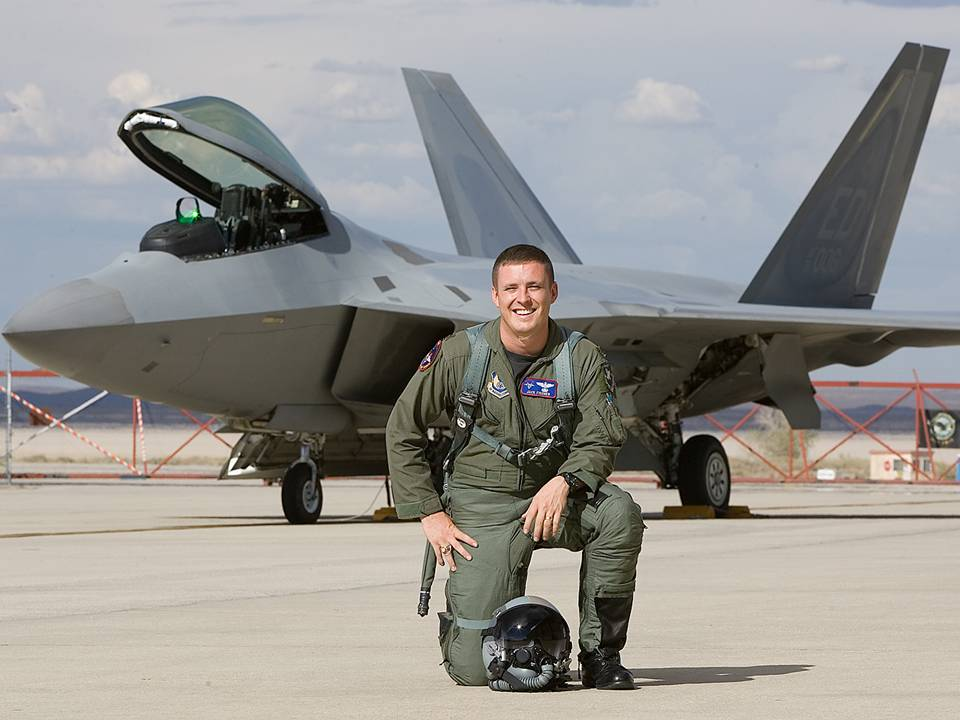
Fischer during F-22 Flight Testing

Fischer is a Colonel in the U.S. Air Force. He attended Specialized Undergraduate Pilot Training at Laughlin Air Force Base, Texas, in 1998. Afterwards he attended F-15E Strike Eagle training at Seymour-Johnson Air Force Base, North Carolina, before being assigned as an operational pilot in the 391st Fighter Squadron Bold Tigers.

Fischer served two combat tours in Southwest Asia following September 11, 2001, and was part of Operation Enduring Freedom and Operation Southern Watch over Afghanistan and Iraq.

He is a 2004 graduate of the U.S. Air Force Test Pilot School (Class 03B) at Edwards Air Force Base, California, and was presented with the Onizuka Prop Wash Award.

In 2006, Fischer again returned to Edwards Air Force Base, as part of the F-22 Combined Test Force and 411th Flight Test Squadron testing the F-22 Raptor. In 2008, he was selected as a Strategic Policy Intern in Washington, D.C. While serving at The Pentagon, Fischer served in the Chairman's Action Group for the Chairman of the Joint Chiefs of Staff and in the Space and Intelligence Capabilities Office with the Senior Advisor for the Under Secretary of Defense for Acquisition, Technology and Logistics.

Colonel Fischer is an Air Force Command Pilot with 3,000 flight hours in more than 45 types of aircraft.

== NASA career ==
Fischer was selected in June 2009 as a member of the NASA Astronaut Group 20 and qualified as an astronaut in 2011. Fischer has worked in the Capsule Communicator (CAPCOM) Soyuz, International Space Station Operations, International Space Station Integration, and Exploration branches of the Astronaut Office.

In 2013, Fischer served as cavenaut into the ESA CAVES training in Sardinia, alongside Jeremy Hansen, Michael Barratt, Satoshi Furukawa, Aleksei Ovchinin and Paolo Nespoli.

=== Expedition 51/52 ===
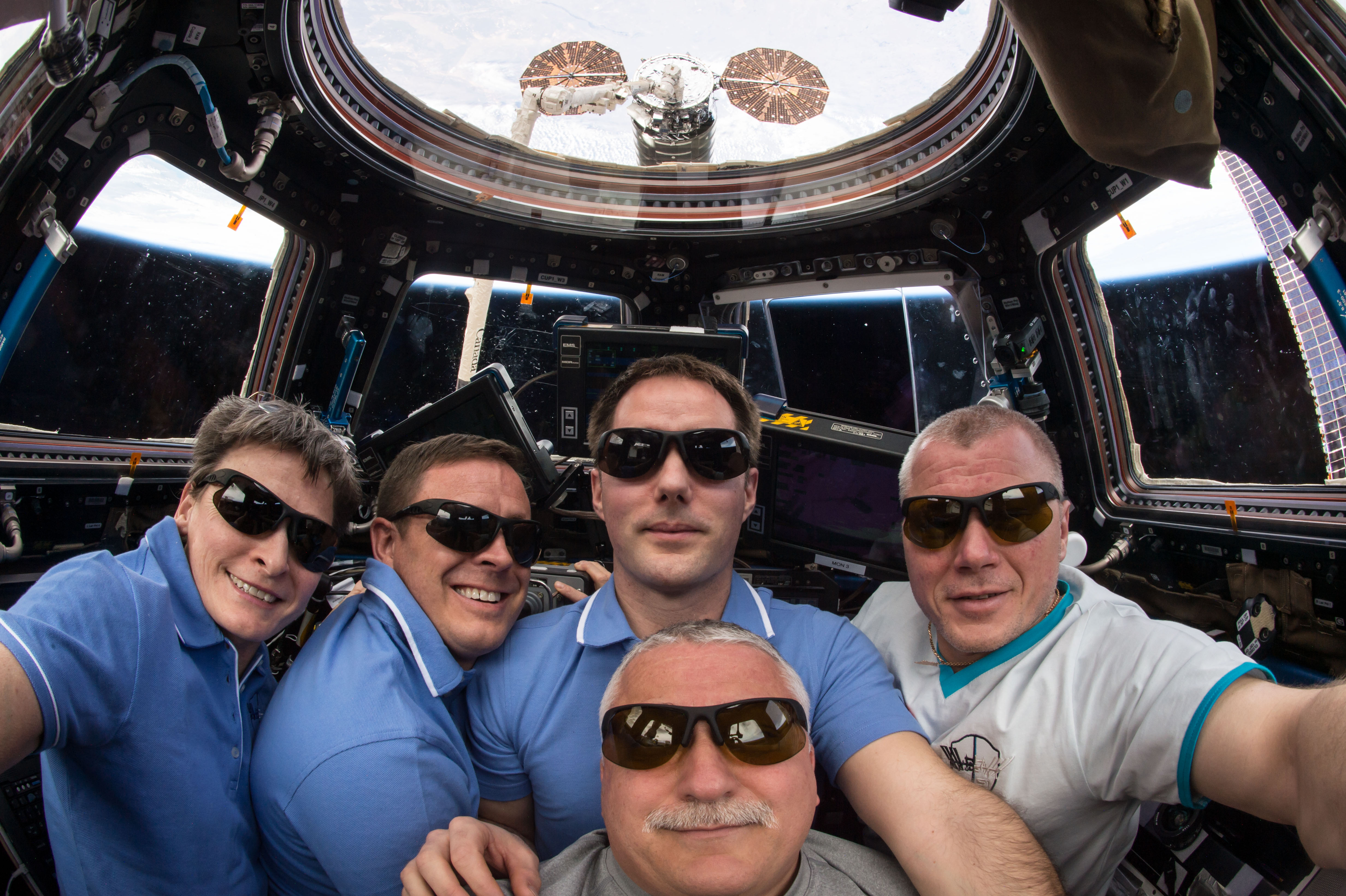
Fischer (second left) with the rest of the Expedition 51 crew in the cupola

Originally assigned to the Expedition 52/53 crew, he was reassigned to launch aboard Soyuz MS-04 to the ISS in April 2017 as a flight engineer for Expedition 51/52.

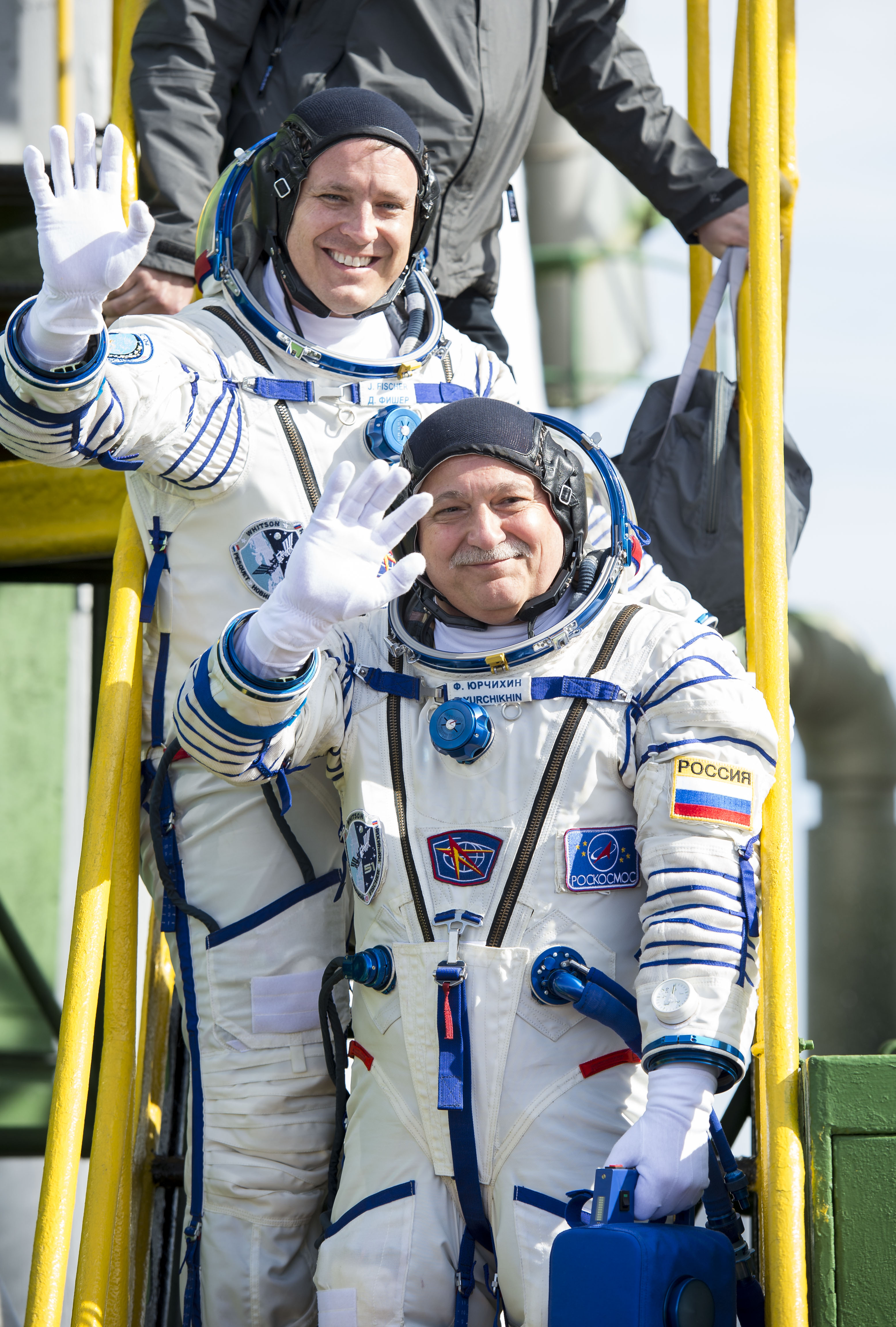
Fischer and Yurchikhin prior to launching on Soyuz MS-04

Fischer launched aboard MS-04 on April 20, 2017. They docked with the station approximately 6 hours after launch, being the first crew of a Soyuz-MS series to make the shorter 6 hour rendezvous instead of the 2 day orbital rendezvous of the previous launches.

On May 13, 2017, Fischer performed his first career EVA with Peggy Whitson. The EVA was shortened due to an issue ahead of the spacewalk where the spacewalkers had to share a SCU (Service Cooling Unit) line after the umbilical for Fischer's EMU suffered from a leak. His suit was in good shape, but the line could not be used. The impact on the EMU battery life meant the full EVA duration couldn't be conducted. They replaced an avionics box on the starboard truss called an ExPRESS Logistics Carrier (ELC), a storage platform. The duration was 4 hours and 13 minutes, and it was the 200th EVA to be performed on the ISS.

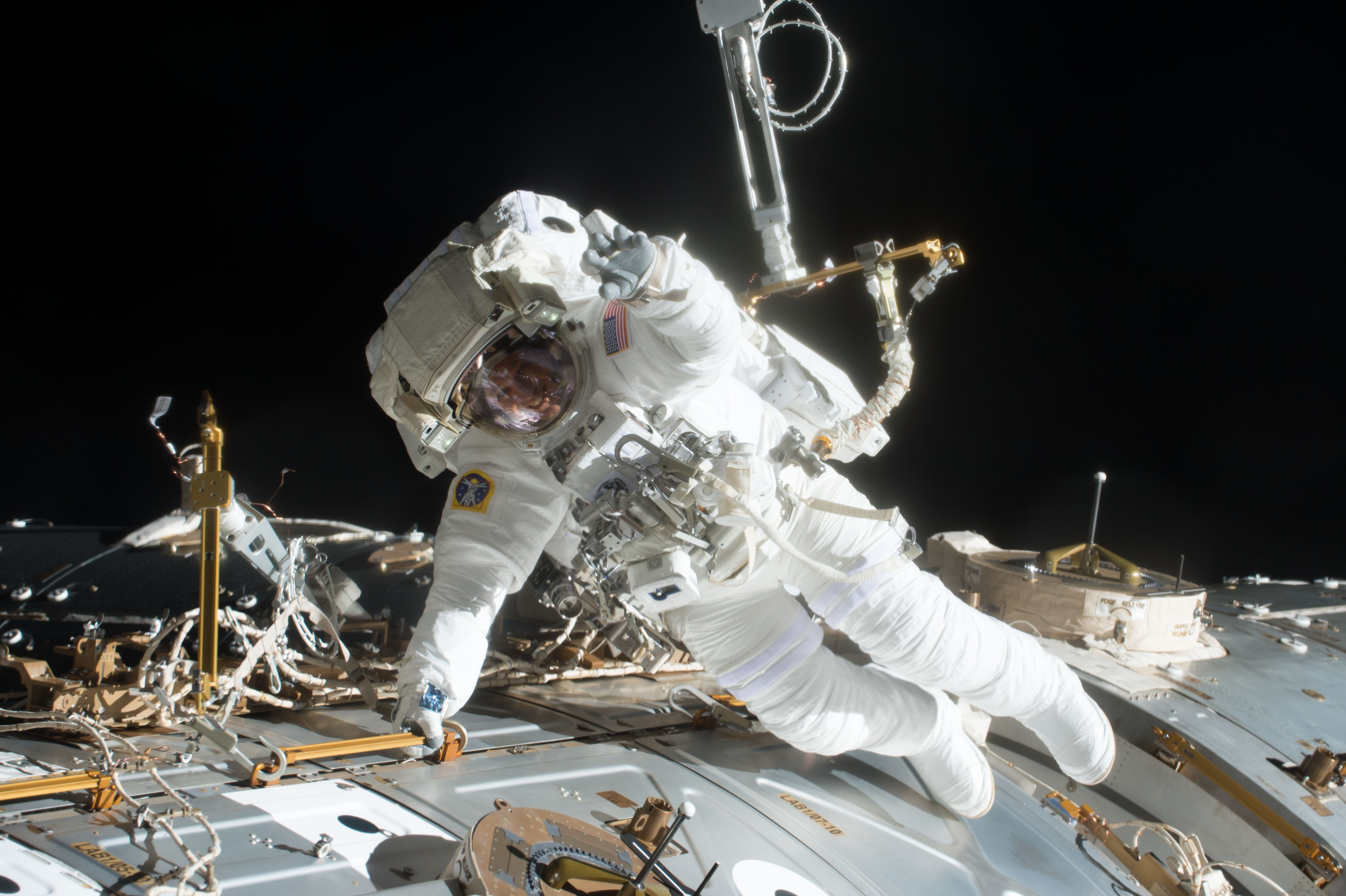
Fischer during an EVA in 2017

On May 23, 2017, Fischer performed his second EVA with Whitson. They replaced a backup multiplexer-demultiplexer (MDM) unit that had failed on May 20, 2017. The duration was 2 hours and 46 minutes.

Fischer returned to Earth along with Peggy Whitson and Fyodor Yurchikhin aboard Soyuz MS-04 on September 3, 2017. The overall duration of his stay in space was 135 days, 18 hours and 8 minutes.

On May 24, 2018, he announced his early retirement from NASA to return to Air Force Service.

== Subsequent career ==
Following retirement from NASA, Fischer served as the Chief Technology Officer for Collins Aerospace in Houston. In February 2021, Fischer joined Intuitive Machines as Vice President of Strategic Programs, and during their IM-1 mission Fischer served as one of the Mission Directors.

Military offices
Preceded by Jacob Middleton Jr.	Vice Commander of the 50th Space Wing; 2019–2020	Position disestablished
