= Sergey Ryazansky =

Russian cosmonaut (born 1974)

- Сергей Рязанский
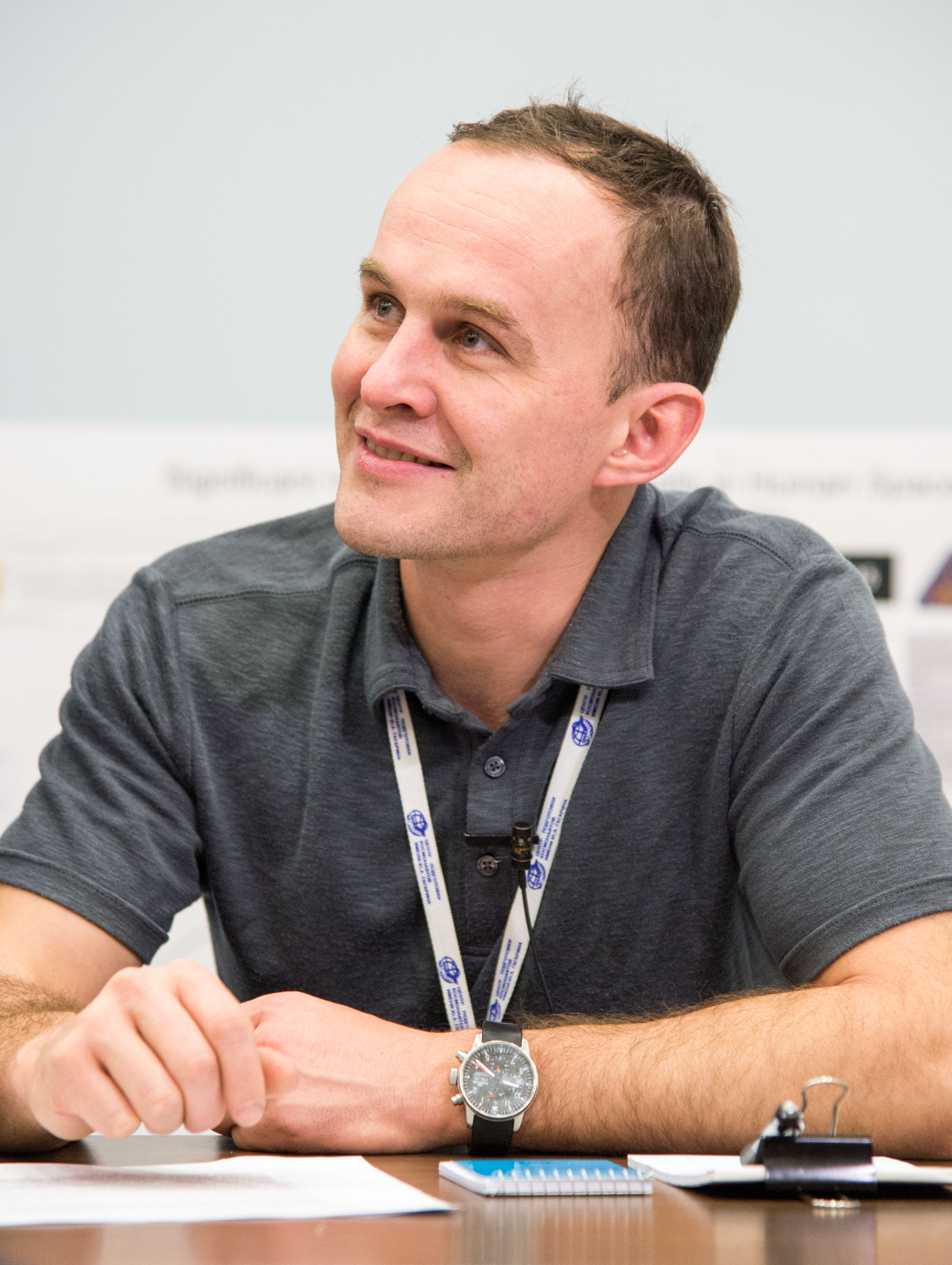
- Born: November 13, 1974 (age 51); Moscow, Soviet Union
- Education: Moscow State University (1996)
- Occupation: Biochemist
- Space career

Roscosmos cosmonaut
- Status: Retired
- Time in space: 304 days 22 hours 21 minutes
- Selection: 2003 IMBP-6 Cosmonaut Group
- Total EVAs: 4
- Total EVA time: 27 hours and 39 minutes
- Missions: Soyuz TMA-10M (Expedition 37/38), Soyuz MS-05, (Expedition 52/53)
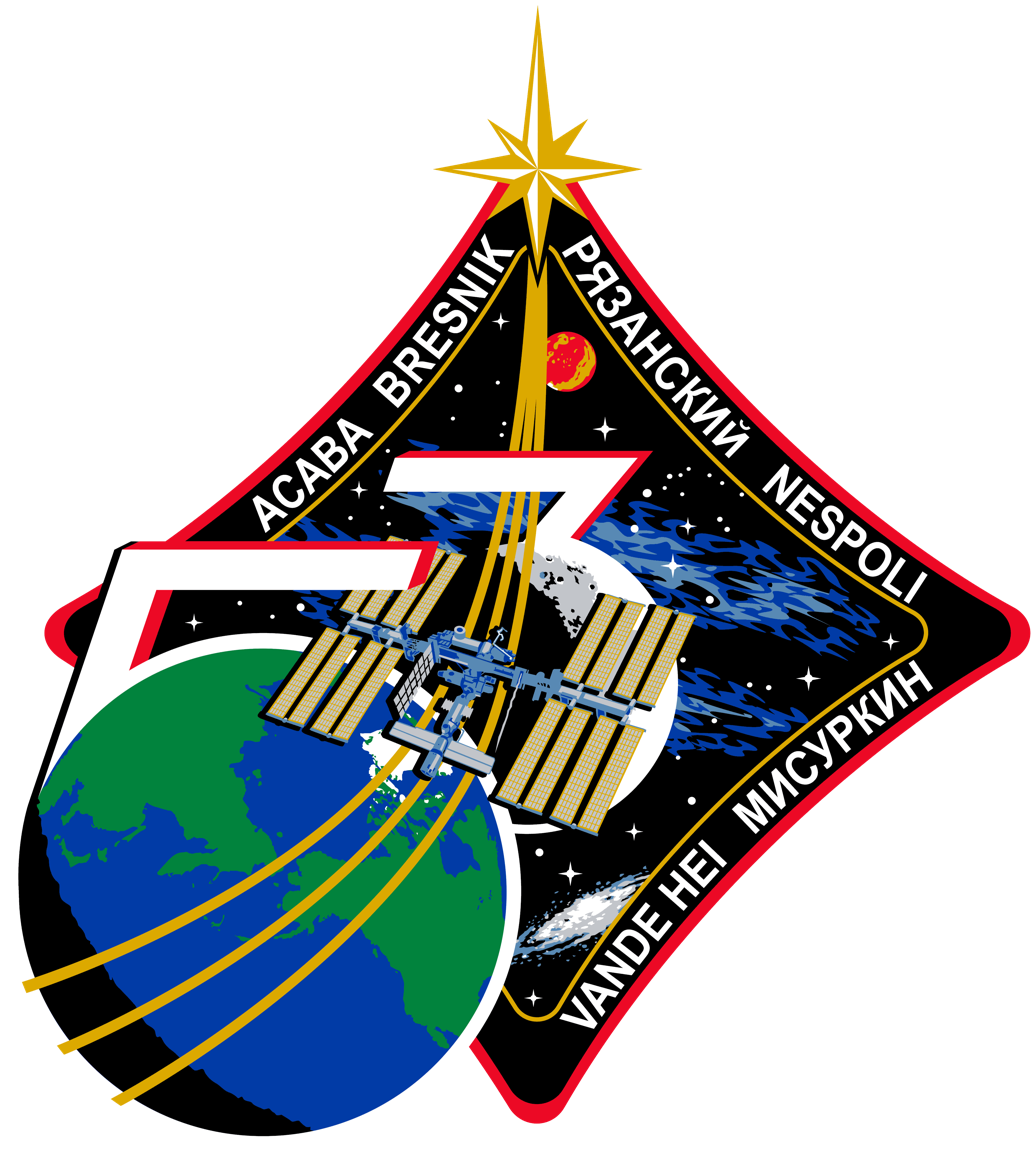
- Mission insignia
- Retired: July 16, 2018

Sergey Nikolayevich Ryazansky (Russian: Серге́й Николаевич Рязанский; born November 13, 1974) is a former Russian cosmonaut. He was selected as commander of the IMBP-6 cosmonaut group in 2003, but later transferred to the TsPK Cosmonaut Group. Ryazansky made his first spaceflight aboard the Soyuz TMA-10M and served as a flight engineer for Expedition 37/38 mission from September 2013 until March 2014. In 2017, Ryazansky returned to space was the commander of Soyuz MS-05 and served as flight engineer for Expedition 52/53.

== Personal ==
Ryazansky was born in Moscow, Soviet Union. He is the grandson of Mikhail Ryazanskiy, chief Soviet guidance designer of the Sputnik era. He had a first wife, Lyubava Dmitrievna, divorced and has a second wife, Alexandra. He has a son and two daughters from his first marriage, and a son from his second marriage.

== Education ==
Sergey Ryazansky attended Moscow State University and graduated as a biochemist in 1996. After college he began working as a researcher at the Institute of Biomedical Problems.

== Cosmonaut career ==
Ryazansky was selected as a research and test cosmonaut in 2003. He completed training in 2005. In 2009 he participated in a 105-day mission as part of phase two of the Mars 500 program.

=== Expedition 37/38 ===
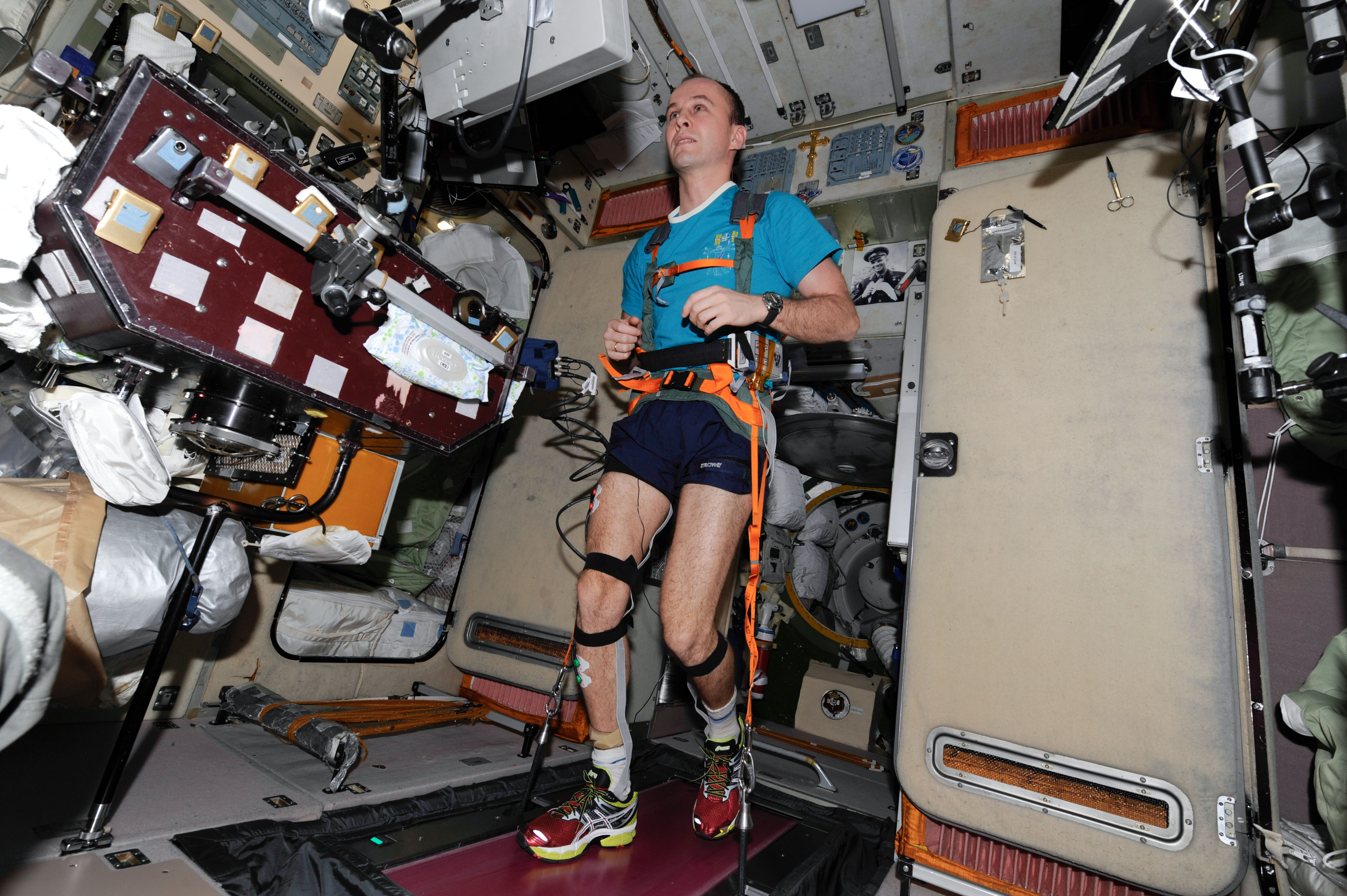
Ryazansky exercises on the Treadmill Vibration Isolation System (TVIS) in the Zvezda Service Module.

Sergey Ryazansky launched to the International Space Station on his first spaceflight on board the Soyuz TMA-10M spacecraft on September 25, 2013 alongside Russian cosmonaut, Oleg Kotov and American astronaut Michael S. Hopkins. Ryazansky performed three EVA's during his mission; all were performed with crewmate Oleg Kotov. He served as a Flight Engineer on Expedition 37 and Expedition 38 before returning to Earth aboard the Soyuz on March 11, 2014.

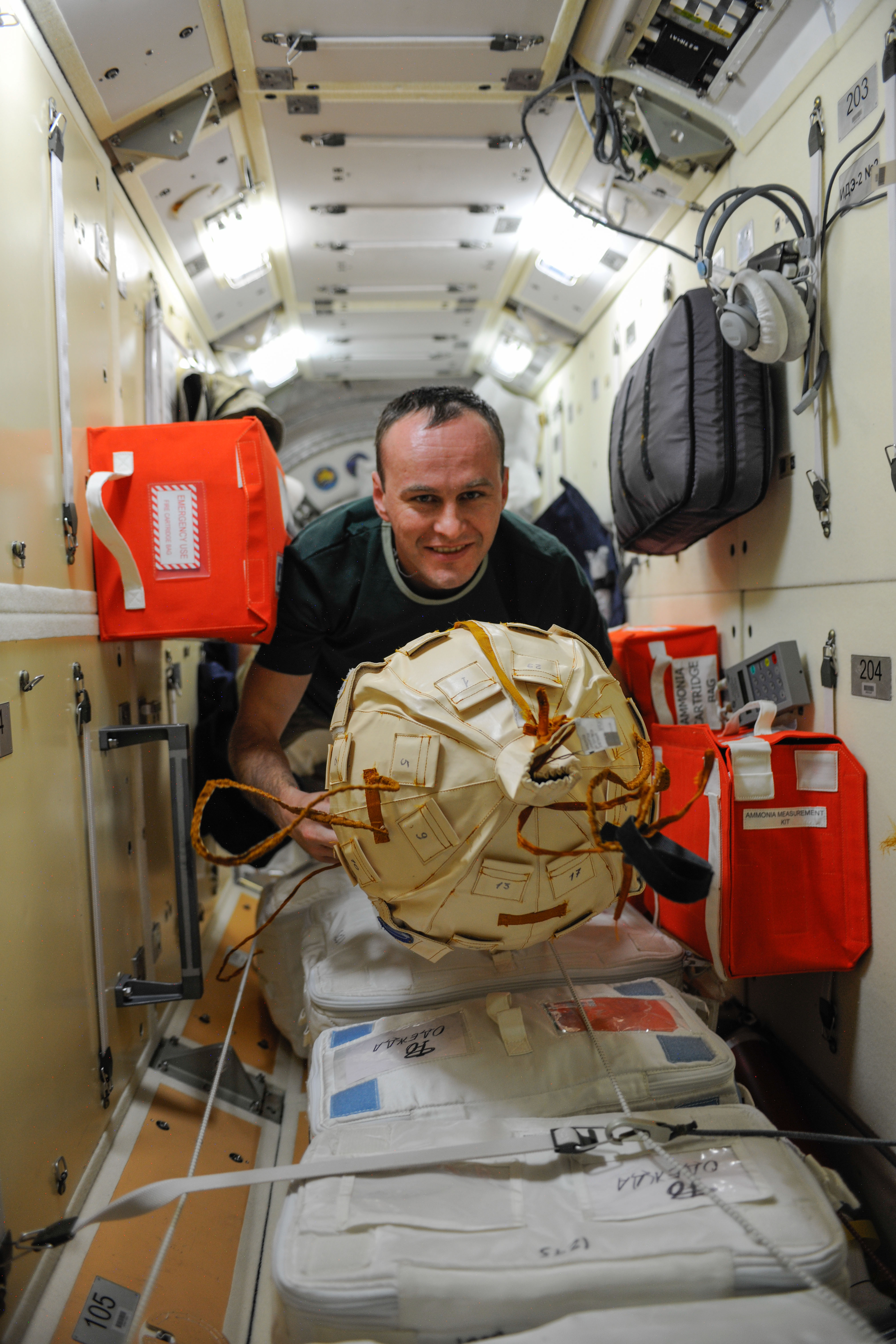
Ryazansky working in Rassvet

=== Expedition 52/53 ===
Ryazansky was the commander of Soyuz MS-05 mission to the ISS and launched on 28 July 2017 15:41 UTC. He was a flight engineer for Expedition 52 and Expedition 53. Ryazansky returned to Earth on December 14, 2017. The Soyuz MS-05 landed on 8:38 UTC. The duration of the mission was 138 days, 16 hours, 56 minutes and 37 seconds.

Statistics

#	Spacecraft launch	Launch date	Mission	Spacecraft landing	Landing date	Duration	Spacewalk times	Spacewalk duration
1	Soyuz TMA-10	26 September 2013, 20:59 UTC	ISS-37 / ISS-38	Soyuz TMA-10	11 March 2014, 03:24 UTC	166 days 06 hours 25 minutes	3	20 hours 05 minutes
2	Soyuz MS-05	28 July 2017, 15:41 UTC	ISS-52 / ISS-53	Soyuz MS-05	14 December 2017, 08:38 UTC	138 days 16 hours 57 minutes	1	07 hours 34 minutes
Total						304 days 23 hours 22 minutes	4	27 hours 39 minutes

== Spacewalks ==
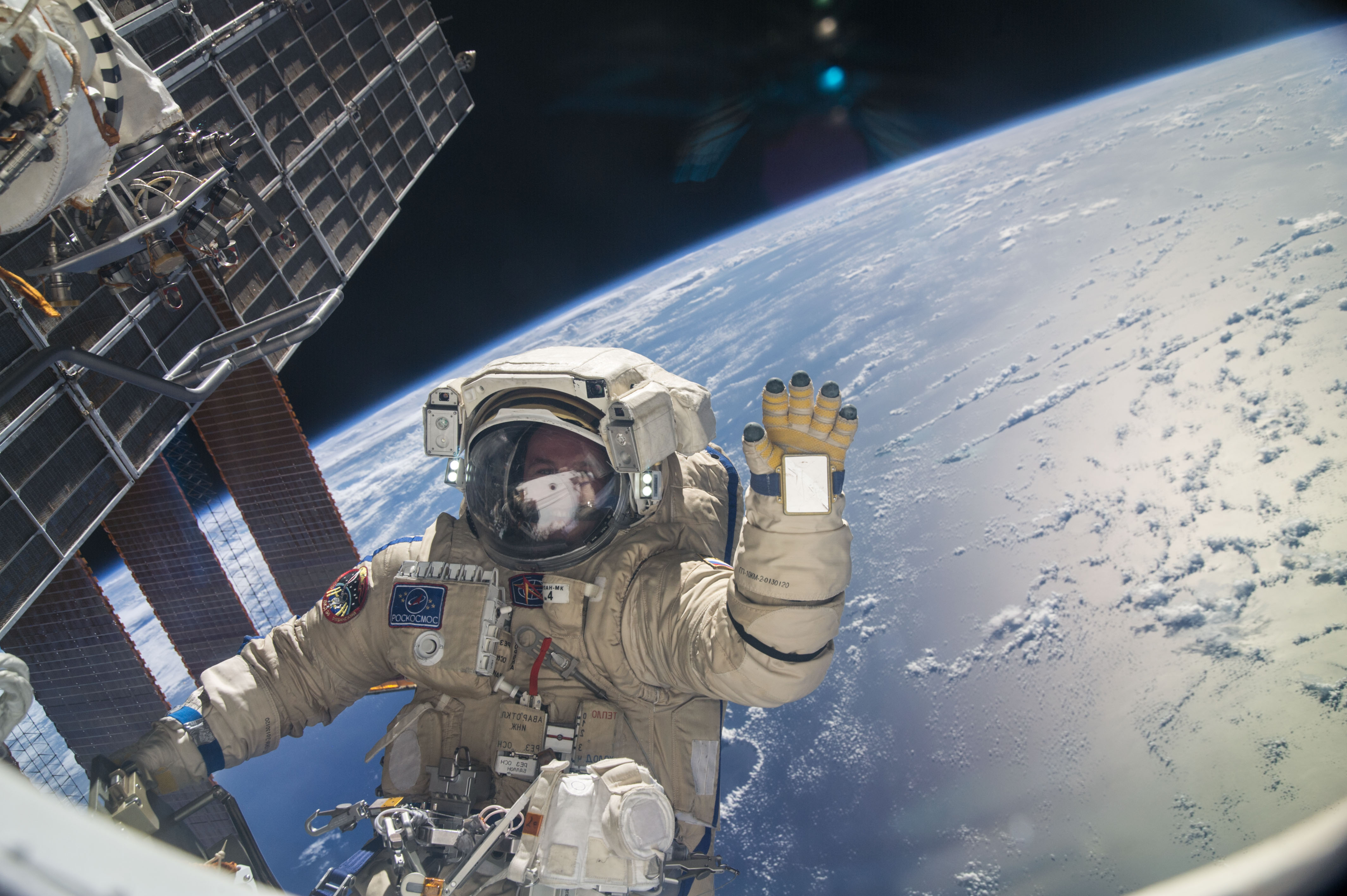
Sergey Ryazanskiy is pictured during his first career spacewalk on 9 November 2013.

Ryazansky performed his first spacewalk outside the ISS with cosmonaut Oleg Kotov on 9 November 2013,. They took the Olympic torch for the 2014 Winter Olympic Games outside ISS. They also continued work on an extravehicular activity workstation and biaxial pointing platform by removing launch brackets and bolts, as well as retrieving an experimental package. The planned installation of a foot restraint on the mounting seat of the workstation was deferred to a future spacewalk after the spacewalkers noticed some issues with its alignment. The spacewalk lasted 5 hours 50 minutes.

On 27 December 2013, Ryazansky and Kotov were again outside of the ISS to perform a spacewalk. The cosmonauts attached two (high and medium resolution) cameras as part of a commercial agreement between a Canadian firm and the Russian Federal Space Agency to provide Earth views to internet-based subscribers. Kotov routed the data and telemetry cables for the medium resolution camera, however, flight control team at the Russian Mission Control Center did not see the expected telemetry and electrical connectivity from the cameras. Eventually, the cosmonauts were instructed to remove the cameras and return them back inside the ISS for further analysis. In addition to the camera installation work, Ryazansky and Kotov also removed and jettisoned the Vsplesk experiment package designed to monitor seismic effects using high-energy particle streams in the near-Earth environment. The spacewalkers next attached the more sophisticated earthquake-monitoring Seismoprognoz experiment to a Zvezda handrail. The spacewalk lasted 8 hours and 7 minutes and extended the record for the longest Russian spacewalk set by Expedition 36 cosmonauts Fyodor Yurchikhin and Alexander Misurkin, who conducted a 7-hour, 29 minute spacewalk on 16 August 2013.

On 27 January 2014, Ryazansky did perform his third spacewalk outside the ISS with cosmonaut Oleg Kotov. The cosmonauts completed work that could not be finished up during their last spacewalk on December 27. After exiting the Pirs docking compartment, the two cosmonauts arrived at the outside of the Zvezda service module. They then installed a high resolution camera and a medium resolution camera to capture Earth imagery, however the medium resolution camera again experienced telemetry issues. Ryazansky and Kotov also removed a cassette container attached to the Pirs docking compartment, installed earlier as part of a materials exposure experiment. They also removed a worksite interface adapter attached to a portable data grapple fixture on the Zarya module to ensure that future operations with the Canadarm2 robotic arm will not be disrupted. The spacewalk marked the fourth EVA conducted during the Expedition 38 and lasted six hours and eight minutes.

On 17 August 2017, Ryazansky performed his fourth spacewalk with cosmonaut Fyodor Yurchikhin. The cosmonauts tested a new version of the Orlan space suit, deploying five nano-satellites and installing external experiments. Spacewalk lasted of 7 hours, 34 minutes.

== See also ==
- List of Heroes of the Russian Federation
