= Soyuz MS-05 =

2017 Russian crewed spaceflight to the ISS

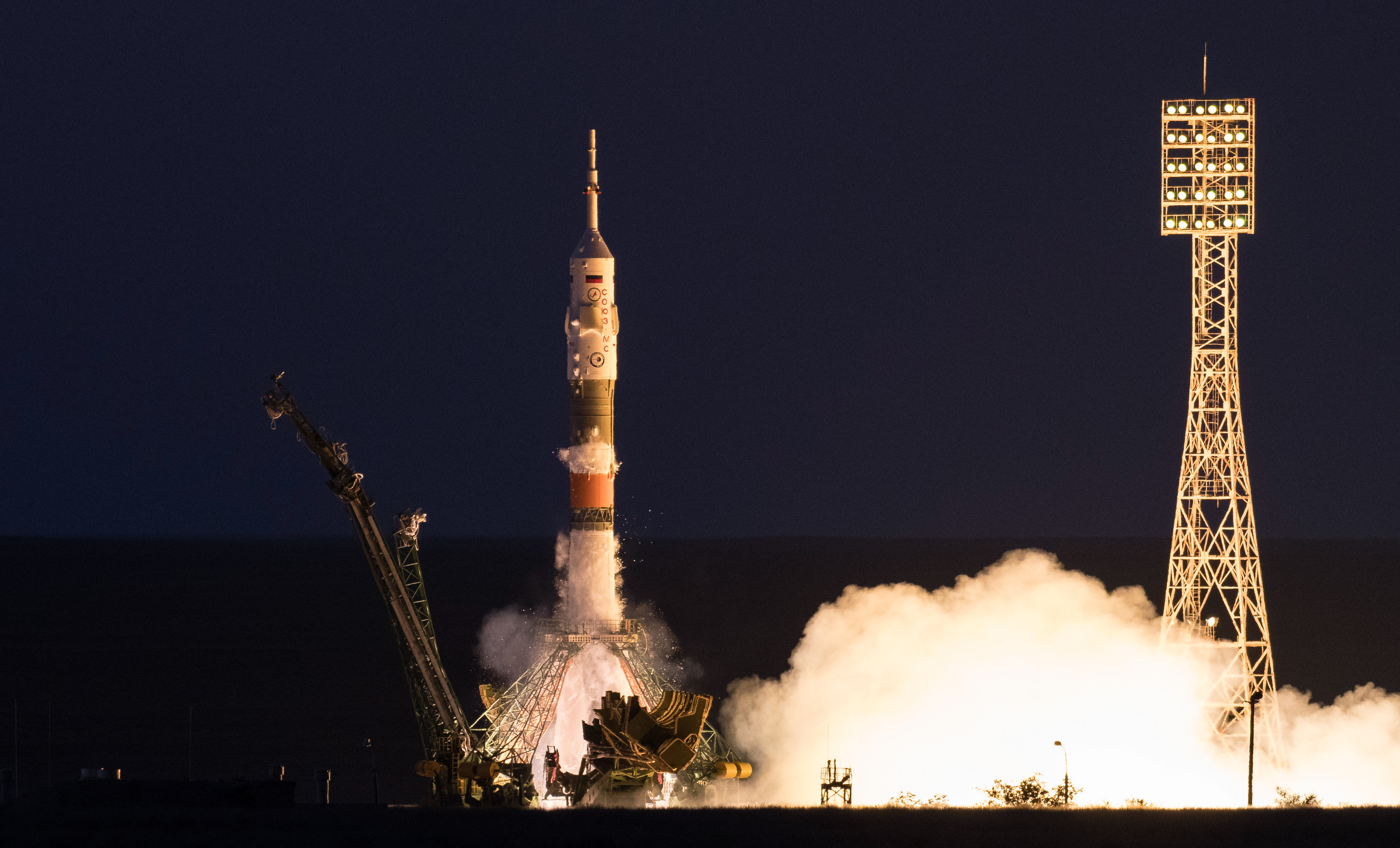
- The launch of Soyuz MS-05
- Mission type: ISS crew transport
- Operator: Roscosmos
- COSPAR ID: 2017-043A
- SATCAT no.: 42898
- Mission duration: 139 days 4 hours 57 minutes 16 seconds

Spacecraft properties
- Spacecraft: Soyuz MS
- Spacecraft type: Soyuz MS 11F732A48
- Manufacturer: Energia
- Launch mass: 7080 kg

Crew
- Crew size: 3
- Members: Sergey Ryazansky; Paolo Nespoli; Randolph Bresnik
- Callsign: Borei (Boreas)

Start of mission
- Launch date: 28 July 2017, 15:41 UTC
- Rocket: Soyuz-FG
- Launch site: Baikonur, Pad 1/5
- Contractor: RKTs Progress

End of mission
- Landing date: 14 December 2017, 08:38 UTC
- Landing site: Steppes of the Kazakhstan

Orbital parameters
- Reference system: Geocentric orbit
- Regime: Low Earth orbit
- Inclination: 51.66°

Docking with ISS
- Docking port: Rassvet nadir
- Docking date: 28 July 2017, 21:54 UTC
- Undocking date: 14 December 2017, 05:14 UTC
- Time docked: 138 days 7 hours 20 minutes
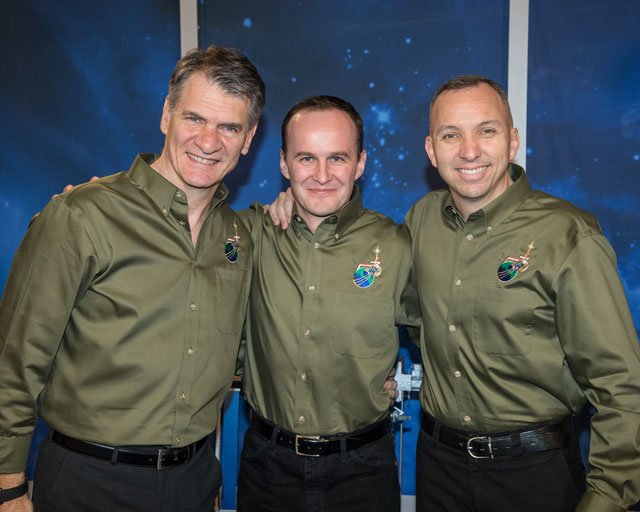
- Mission insignia From left to right: Nespoli, Ryazansky, Bresnik Soyuz programme (crewed)

Soyuz MS-05 was a Soyuz spaceflight which launched on 28 July 2017. It transported three members of the Expedition 52 crew to the International Space Station. Soyuz MS-05 was the 134th flight of a Soyuz spacecraft. The crew consisted of a Russian commander, and a European and an American flight engineer. The European segment of the mission was called "Vita". It returned to Earth on 14 December 2017 after 138 days on orbit.

== Spacecraft ==
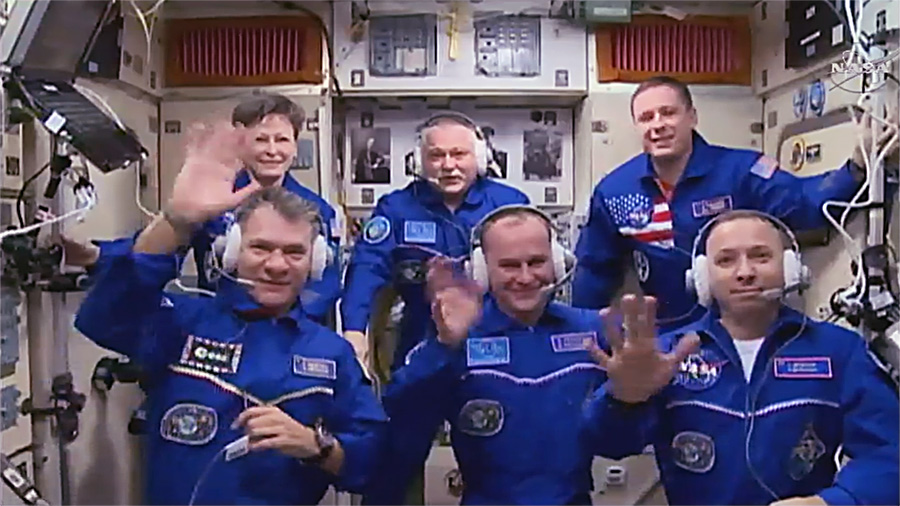
The Expedition 52 crew expanded to six. In the front row from left are the newest crew members Paolo Nespoli, Sergey Ryazanskiy and Randy Bresnik. In the back row are Peggy Whitson, Fyodor Yurchikhin and Jack Fischer.

Soyuz MS introduces following upgrades: more efficient solar panels, the new Kurs-NA approach and docking system, which has a mass of less than half that of its predecessor, additional micro-meteoroid debris shielding, a modified docking and attitude control engine – which will add redundancy during docking and deorbit burns, a main computer, TsVM-101, which has a mass (8.3 kg) of only one-eighth that of its Argon-16 predecessor (70 kg) and a smaller volume, a unified digital command/telemetry system that allows telemetry to be transmitted via Luch relay satellites for control of the spacecraft as well as to provide crew with positioning data when the spacecraft is out of range of ground tracking stations and upgraded GLONASS / GPS and COSPAS-SARSAT satellite systems to provide more accurate location services during search/rescue operations after landing.

During the flight the spacecraft fulfills the following tasks: delivery of a visiting crew consisting of up to three persons and small accompanying cargoes, constant availability of the spacecraft, attached to the station during its crewed flight, in the standby mode to be ready for emergency descent of the main crew onto the ground in case of hazardous situation on the station, cosmonaut illness or injury, etc. (assured crew return vehicle function); planned descent of the visiting crew onto the ground, returning to the ground, together with the crew, payloads of relatively low mass and volume disposal of wastes from the station in the living compartment to be burned down in the atmosphere during descent.

== Crew ==
Prime crew
Position	Crew
Commander	(Russia) Sergey Ryazansky, Roscosmos; Expedition 52; Second and last spaceflight
Flight engineer	(United States) Randy Bresnik, NASA; Expedition 52; Second spaceflight
Flight engineer	(Italy) Paolo Nespoli, ESA; Expedition 52; Third and last spaceflight

Backup crew
Position	Crew
Commander	(Russia) Alexander Misurkin, Roscosmos
Flight engineer	(United States) Mark T. Vande Hei, NASA
Flight engineer	(Japan) Norishige Kanai, JAXA
