= Expedition 52 =

52nd Long-duration mission to the International Space Station

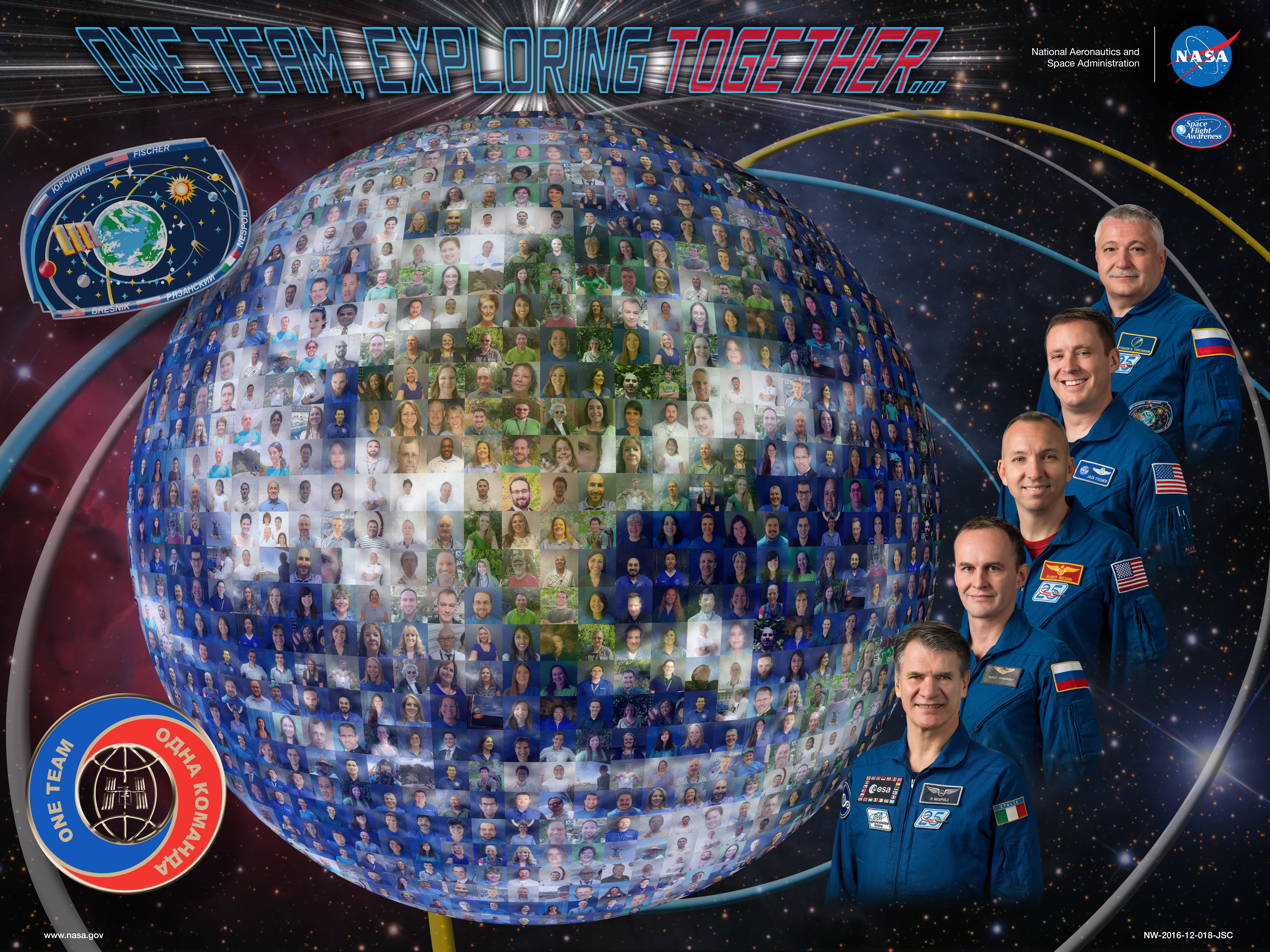
- Promotional Poster
- Mission type: Long-duration expedition

Expedition
- Space station: International Space Station
- Began: 2 June 2017 UTC
- Ended: 2 September 2017 UTC
- Arrived aboard: Soyuz MS-03; Soyuz MS-04; Soyuz MS-05
- Departed aboard: Soyuz MS-04; Soyuz MS-05

Crew
- Crew size: 6
- Members: Expeditions 50/51/52: Peggy A. Whitson; Expeditions 51/52: Fyodor Yurchikhin; Jack D. Fischer; Expeditions 52/53: Sergey Ryazansky; Randolph J. Bresnik; Paolo Nespoli
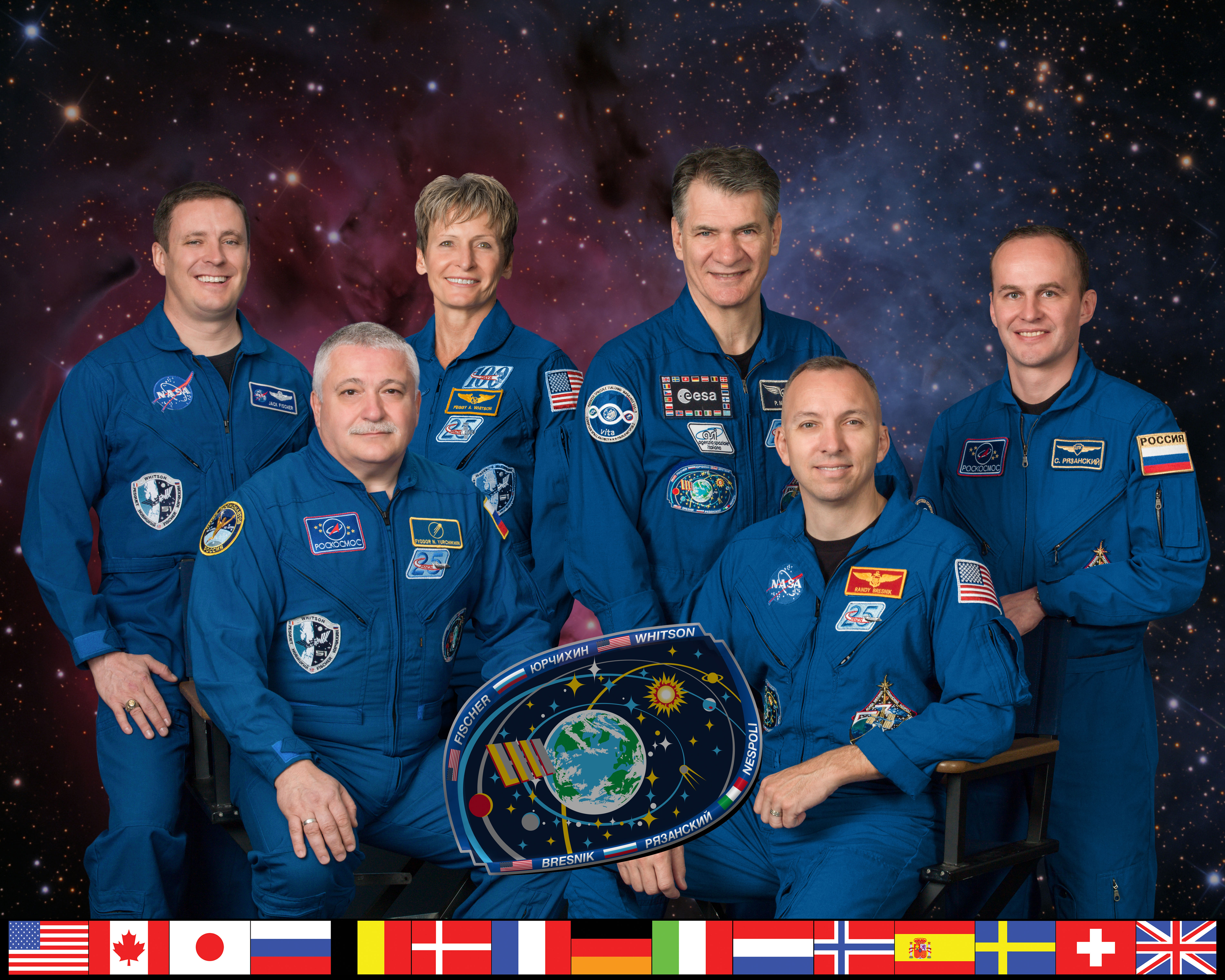
- Expedition 52 mission patch (l-r) Fischer, Yurchikhin, Whitson, Nespoli, Bresnik, Ryazanskiy ISS expeditions

Expedition 52 (June – September 2017) was the 52nd expedition to the International Space Station. It officially began on June 2, 2017 10:47 UTC, with the undocking of Soyuz MS-03. Transfer of command from Expedition 51 was done on June 1, 2017.

Due to a decision to cut down the number of participating Russian cosmonauts in 2017, only two crew members were launched on Soyuz MS-04, which brought the ISS total crew down to five people. However, it was later decided that Peggy Whitson would stay on board longer, transferring from Expedition 51 to maintain a full crew of six astronauts over the summer, after the arrival of three new members on Soyuz MS-05. Expedition 51 officially ended on September 2, 2017 11:47 UTC, with the undocking of Soyuz MS-04.

== Crew ==
Position	First part (June to July 2017)	Second part (July to September 2017)
Commander	Fyodor Yurchikhin, RSA; Fifth and last spaceflight	
Flight engineer	Jack Fischer, NASA; Only spaceflight	
Flight engineer	Peggy Whitson, NASA; Third (last NASA) spaceflight	
Flight engineer		Randy Bresnik, NASA; Second spaceflight
Flight engineer		Sergey Ryazansky, RSA; Second and last spaceflight
Flight engineer		Paolo Nespoli, ESA; Third and last spaceflight

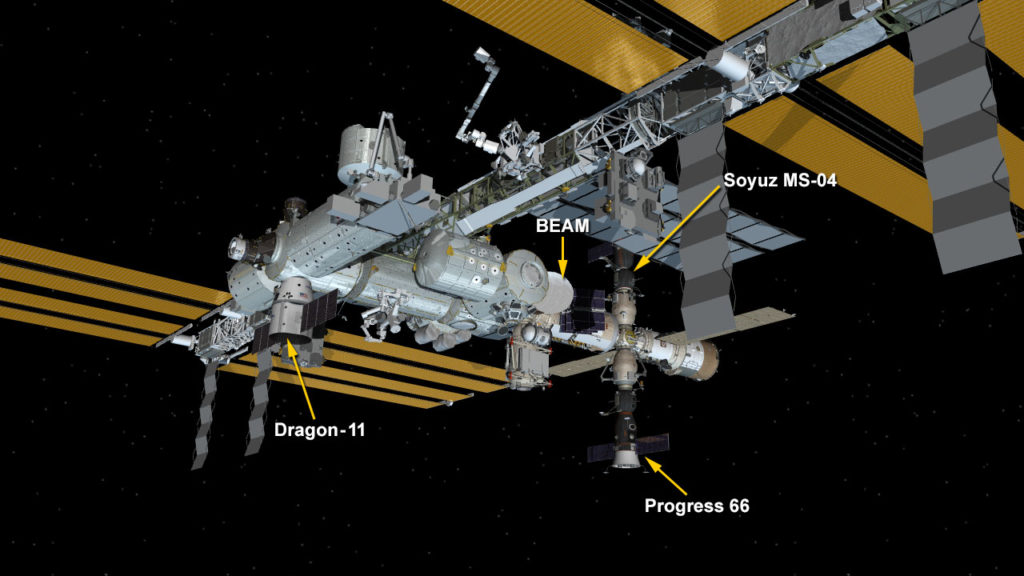
ISS Configuration after swapping Dragon for Cygnus, 5 June 2017

== Mission highlights ==
=== June 2017 – Expedition 52 begins ===
NASA astronaut Peggy Whitson handed over command of the International Space Station to Russian cosmonaut Fyodor Yurchikin in a traditional Change of Command ceremony, which began at 15:50 UTC on June 1.

==== Expedition 51 duo undocked and landed ====
After spending 194 days aboard the International Space Station, Expedition 51 crew members Oleg Novitskiy of Roscosmos and Thomas Pesquet undocked from the station at 10:47 UTC, officially marking the start of Expedition 52. Novitskiy and Pesquet landed their Soyuz MS-03 spacecraft in Kazakhstan at 14:10 UTC on June 2.

==== Supply ship swap ====
On June 3, a SpaceX Falcon 9 lifted off with a Dragon resupply ship as part of SpaceX mission CRS-11 from Cape Canaveral pad 39A with supplies and a new Roll Out Solar Array (ROSA) prototype. Jack Fischer undocked the Cygus OA-7 dubbed "SS John Glenn" from the station on June 4 to make room for the Dragon resupply. Fischer and Whitson grappled the Dragon cargo craft on June 5 with the Canadarm2 and docked it on the Earth-facing side of the Harmony module on the Pirs docking compartment. The Roscosmos Progress MS-06 launched from the Baikonur Cosmodrome on June 14, carrying more than 3 tons of supplies. The Progress MS-06 docked on June 16 to the aft port of Zvezda.

==== June research ====
Fischer and Whitson performed observations of mold and bacteria samples for student-led biology experiments and protein crystal sample experiments. Whitson cared for rodents in the Rodent Habitat Facility to understand healing mechanisms and the efficiency of osteoinductive drugs in low gravity and performed experiments for a cardiac stem cell study to understand the effects of microgravity on the aging process. Fischer and Whitson set up a seedling growth botany study to investigate the effects of light and microgravity on Arabidopsis thaliana. Fisher was also the subject of a Vascular Echo study that examined changes in blood vessels and the heart while in space and their recovery back on Earth. Yurchikhin studied pain sensation in space to help researches develop proposals to improve health care in orbit. Yurchikhin, Whitson and Fischer also took body measurements for the in-flight conditions that could be compared to pre- and post-flight conditions. Whitson started a cancer study to evaluate antibody-drug conjugates, which can increase the effectiveness of chemotherapy while reducing its side effects.

=== July 2017 – Full crew after Soyuz MS-05 ===
==== Dragon CRS-11 departs ====
Fischer and Whitson released the SpaceX Dragon CRS-11 on July 3 at 6:41 UTC.

==== July research ====
Whitson tested her ability to work on interactive tasks as part of a Fine Motor Skills study to measure how motor skills are affected by long-term microgravity exposure, different phases of adaptation and recovery after returning to Earth. Fischer finished operations with a Group Combustion Module experiment, where droplets of decane were arranged on a thin-fiber lattice so that the flame and temperature distribution could be measured as the flame spreads. Whitson and Fischer also collected their own blood, urine and saliva samples for the Fluid Shifts experiment that measured how much fluid shifts from the lower body to the upper body in microgravity and the effects on the human eye. Whitson started the Mag3D experiment that magnetizes cells to make them easier to handle in microgravity. Whitson also setup gear for a Two Phase Flow experiment that studied interfacial behaviors of perfluorohexane, an electronic coolant, under different conditions. Fischer used the exercise bike to research the effectiveness of high intensity, low volume exercise, which showed that maximum intensity exercise appears better for aerobic capacity than normal intensity exercise in microgravity.

==== Station maintenance ====
Fyodor Yurchikhin maintained the life support system on the Russian side of the station by preplacing pumps and hoses and re-pressurizing the cabin. Jack Fischer replaced a failed water separator inside the Tranquility module that was part of the Common Cabin Air Assembly that controls the stations humidity and temperature. Fischer also installed new equipment in the Window Observational Research Facility (WORF).

==== New crew ====
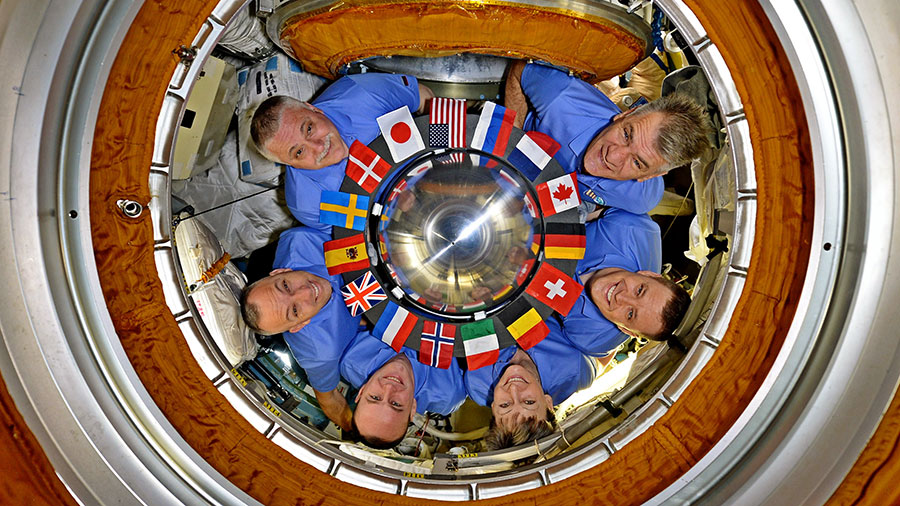
Clockwise from top right: Nespoli, Fischer, Whitson, Ryazankiy, Bresnick and Yurchikhin

On July 28, the Soyuz MS-05 launched from Baikonur Cosmodrome in Kazakhstan with Randy Bresnik of NASA, Sergey Ryazanskiy of Roscosmos and Italian Paolo Nespoli of ESA. They docked later that day while both spacecraft were over Germany.

=== August 2017 – Research and resupply ===
==== August research ====
Nespoli and Bresnik recorded their experiences with space headaches, researches later concluded that changes in cerebral blood flow and intracranial pressure caused them, opposed to the theory that it was space motion sickness. Fischer and Whitson studied a new drugs effects on mouse bone atrophy, current therapies cannot restore lost bone, but the new drug from the University of California at Los Angeles had the potential to rebuild bone and block further bone loss.

==== SpaceX delivered supplies ====
On August 16, Fischer and Nespoli captured the SpaceX CRS-12 Dragon using the station's robotic arm and installed it on the station's Harmony module. The Dragon delivered more than 6,400 pounds of supplies including an ice cream treat for the astronauts.

==== Spacewalk ====
Yurchikhin and Ryazankiy exited the Pirs Docking Compartment on August 17. They manually deployed 5 nanosatellites and collected test containers from various locations outside the Russian segment of the space station.

=== September 2017 – Mission close out ===
Peggy Whitson, Jack Fischer and Fyodor Yurchikhin touched down on September 3 at 1:21 UTC southeast of Dzhezkazgan in Kazakhstan, in their Soyuz MS-04 capsule. Whitson completed a 288-day mission, her third long duration mission which brought her career total to 665 days in space, a new record for U.S. and 8th on the all time list of days in space. Fischer and Yurchikin completed 136 days in space, giving Yurchikin a total of 673 days in space, placing him 7th of all time at that time.

== Spacewalks ==
EVA #	Spacewalkers	Start (UTC)	End (UTC)	Duration
1.	Fyodor Yurchikhin; Sergey Ryazansky	August 17, 2017; 14:36	August 17, 2017; 22:10	7 hours, 34 minutes
1.	Retrieved the "Restavratsiya" (Restoration) Experiment Hardware, launched 5 Nano Satellites one of them being a Sputnik satellite named "Zerkalo", which was launched to commemorate the 60th anniversary of the original Sputnik and the birth of rocket scientist Konstantin Tsiolkovsky, cleaned the windows on the Russian segment, and installed "Test" containers on the hatches of the Pirs Docking Compartment and the Poisk module, retrieved CKK 9M9 cassettes from Zvezda, installed struts, gap spanners, and handrails on Zvezda in preparation for the arrival of Nauka in the future, installed the "Impact" trays by the Zvezda thrusters, and photographed the aft end of Zvezda and the "OHA" antenna, installed struts, gap spanners, handrails, and ladders on Poisk, photographed the Russian segment.			

== Uncrewed spaceflights to the ISS ==
Resupply missions that visited the International Space Station during Expedition 52:

Spacecraft: ISS flight number	Country	Mission	Launcher	Launch (UTC)	Docked/berthed (UTC) ^{†}	Undocked/unberthed (UTC)	Duration (docked)	Deorbit
SpaceX CRS-11 – CRS SpX-11	United States	Logistics	Falcon 9	3 Jun 2017, 21:07:17	5 Jun 2017, 16:07	3 Jul 2017, 06:41	27d 14h 34m	3 Jul 2017
Progress MS-06 – ISS 67P	Russia	Logistics	Soyuz-2.1a	14 Jun 2017, 09:20:13	16 Jun 2017, 11:37	28 Dec 2017, 01:03:30	194d 13h 26m	28 Dec 2017
SpaceX CRS-12 – CRS SpX-12	United States	Logistics	Falcon 9	14 Aug 2017, 16:31:00	16 Aug 2017, 10:52	17 Sep 2017, 08:40	31d 21h 48m	17 Sep 2017
