= Vinogradov =

Vinogradov or Vinogradoff (Russian: Виноградов) is a surname derived from the Russian word виноград (vinograd, meaning "grape" and виноградник vinogradnik, meaning "vineyard"). Vinogradova (Russian: Виноградова) is a feminine version of the same name. It may be a Russian surname originated in clergy, associated with the symbolism of wine as the blood of Christ. Notable people with the surname include:

- Aleksandr Vinogradov (writer) (1930–2011), a Russian writer
- Aleksandr Vinogradov (canoeist) (born 1951), Soviet sprint canoer
- Alexandre Mikhailovich Vinogradov (1938-2019), Russian and Italian mathematician
- Alexander Vinogradov (geochemist) (1895–1975), Soviet geochemist, academician
- Alexander Vinogradov (bass) (born 1976), a Russian bass opera singer
- Alexandra Vinogradova (born 1988), Russian volleyballer
- Alexei Vinogradov (1899–1940), a Soviet World War II brigade commander
- Anton Vinogradov (born 1973), a Russian voice actor
- Askold Vinogradov (1929–2005), a Russian mathematician
- Dagnis Vinogradovs (born 1981), Latvia flatwater canoer
- Dmitry Vinogradov (1720–1758), a Russian scientist, inventor of porcelain
- Dmitry Vinogradov (mass murderer) (born 1983), Russian mass murderer
- Ekaterina Vinogradova (born 1977), Russian biathlete and cross-country skier.
- Georgi Vinogradov (1908–1980), a Russian tenor
- Ivan Vinogradov (1891–1983), a Russian mathematician
- Maria Vinogradova (1922–1995), Russian actress
- Nadezhda Vinogradova (born 1958), Soviet Union heptathlete
- Nikolai Vinogradov (1905–1979), Soviet naval officer
- Nikolay Vinogradov (1947–2025), the governor of Vladimir Oblast
- Olga Vinogradova (1929–2001), Russian neurophysiologist
- Paul Vinogradoff (1854–1925), a Russian historian
- Pavel Vinogradov (born 1953), a Russian cosmonaut
- Sergei Vinogradov (footballer, born 1981) (born 1981), a Russian soccer player
- Sergei Vinogradov (journalist) (1958–2010), Russian author, journalist and translator
- Vasili Vinogradov (1874–1948), a Russian Tatar opera composer, violinist and pedagogue
- Vera Vinogradova (1895–1982), Soviet composer and pianist
- Viktor Vinogradov (1894–1969), a Russian linguist, literary critic, and academician
- Vladimir Vinogradov (1955–2008), a Russian businessman, the President of Inkombank
- Vladimir Vinogradov (diplomat) (1921–1997), a Soviet diplomat
- Vladislav Vinogradov (1899–1962), Soviet general
- Yekaterina Vinogradova (born 1980), Russian swimmer
- Yelena Vinogradova (born 1964), a Soviet sprinter
- Yuriy Vinogradov (1927–1999), Soviet sprint canoer

== See also ==
- Winograd, surname
- Winogradsky
