= Winogradsky =

Winogradsky is a surname. Notable people with the surname include:

- Winogradsky family from Tokmak, Ukraine, sons of Olga and Isaac Winogradsky:
  - Lew Grade (born Louis Winogradsky)
  - Bernard Delfont (born Boris Winogradsky)
  - Leslie Grade (born László Winogradsky)
    - Michael Grade, son of Leslie
- Éric Winogradsky, French tennis player
- Sergei Winogradsky, Ukrainian scientist

== See also ==
- Vinogradsky (crater), a Martian impact crater
- Winograd, surname
- Vinogradov
