= Vinograd =

Vinograd may refer to:

== Places ==
- Vinograd, Bulgaria, a village in Bulgaria
- Vinograd, Vologda Oblast, a village in Russia
- Vinograd (Pale), a village in Pale, Bosnia and Herzegovina
- Vynohrad (disambiguation), several villages in Ukraine

== People ==
- David Ostrosky Vinograd (born 1956), Mexican actor
- Jerome Vinograd (1913–1976), American biochemist
- Julia Vinograd (1943-2018), American poet
- Samantha Vinograd (born 1983), American pundit

== See also ==
- Vinogradi (disambiguation)
- Winograd
