= Visceral slide =

Visceral slide is a technique while using ultrasound, that if bowel moves less than 2 cm then there is probably adhesion in the bowel. Complete absence of visceral slide is correlated with high chance of adhesions.

Adhesions are common for after laparoscopic examinations and laparoscopic surgery of the bowel. Other causes are peritonitis (inflammation of peritoneal cavity).

== Examples ==
The Canadian astronaut, Colonel Chris Hadfield, underwent an examination for visceral slide in early 2012 to prove the absence of adhesions, before he was cleared to fly to command Expedition 35 on the International Space Station.(Hadfield, 2013; page 134)
