= Soyuz MS-06 =

2017 Russian crewed spaceflight to the ISS

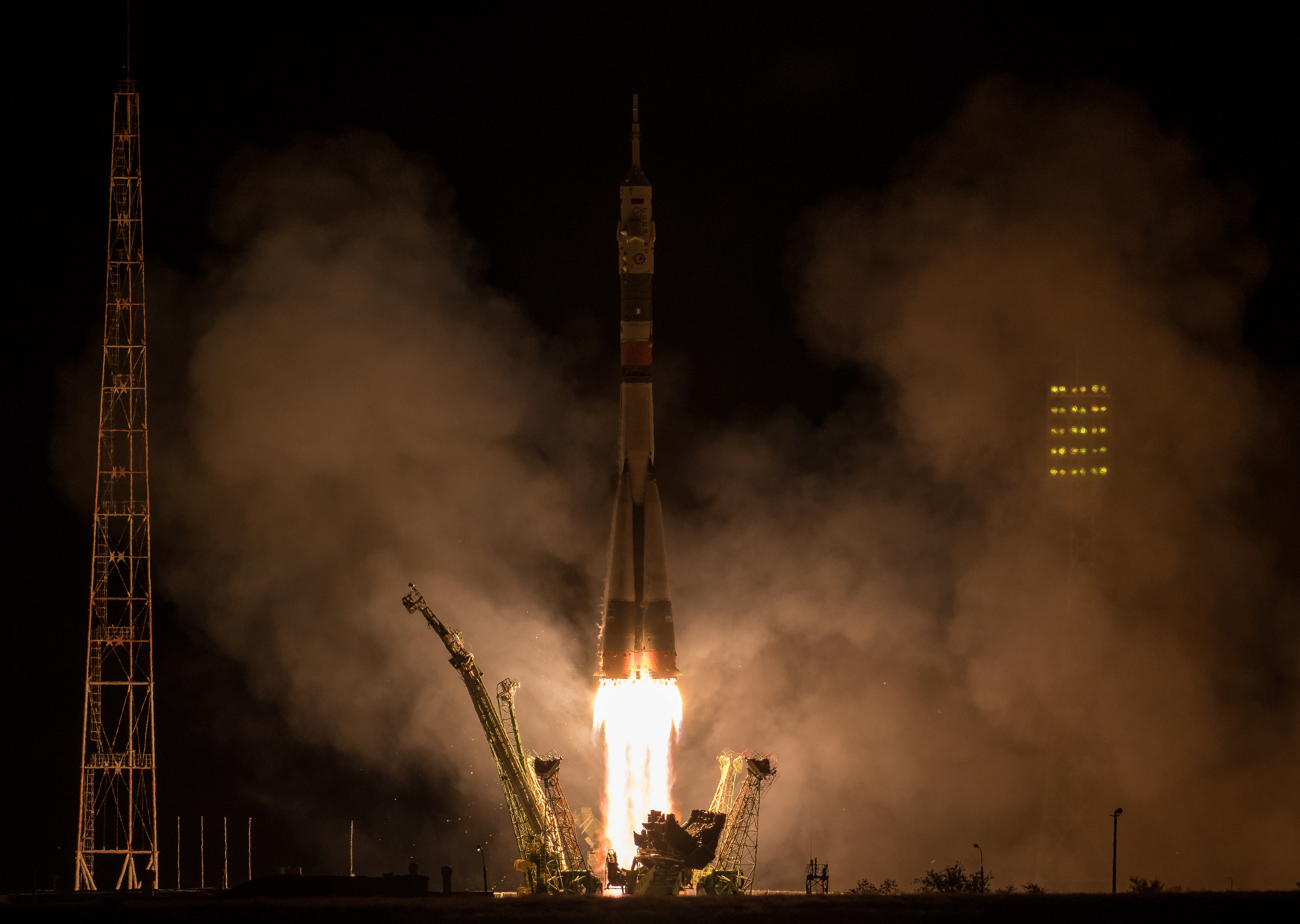
- Soyuz MS-06 night launch to the ISS
- Mission type: ISS crew transport
- Operator: Roscosmos
- COSPAR ID: 2017-054A
- SATCAT no.: 42937
- Mission duration: 168 days 5 hours 13 minutes 58 seconds

Spacecraft properties
- Spacecraft: Soyuz MS
- Spacecraft type: Soyuz-MS 11F747
- Manufacturer: Energia
- Launch mass: 7080 kg

Crew
- Crew size: 3
- Members: Alexander Misurkin; Mark T. Vande Hei; Joseph M. Acaba

Start of mission
- Launch date: 12 September 2017, 21:17:02 UTC
- Rocket: Soyuz-FG
- Launch site: Baikonur, Site 1/5
- Contractor: RKTs Progress

End of mission
- Landing date: 28 February 2018 02:31 UTC
- Landing site: Steppes of Kazakhstan

Orbital parameters
- Reference system: Geocentric orbit
- Regime: Low Earth orbit
- Inclination: 51.66°

Docking with ISS
- Docking port: Poisk zenith
- Docking date: 13 September 2017, 02:55 UTC
- Undocking date: 27 February 2018, 23:08 UTC
- Time docked: 167 days 20 hours 13 minutes
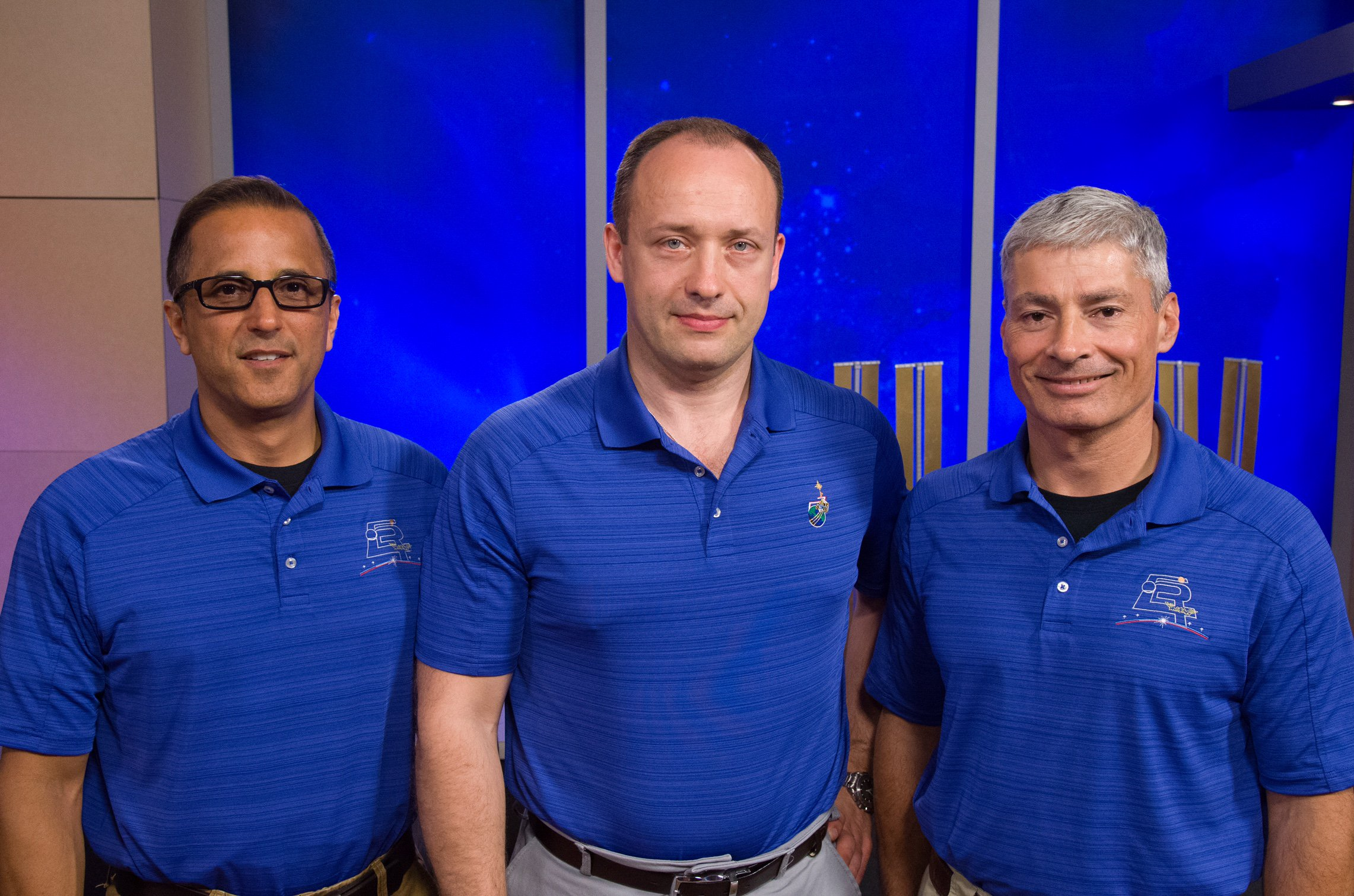
- Mission insignia (l-r) Acaba, Misurkin and Vande Hei Soyuz programme (crewed)

Soyuz MS-06 was a Soyuz spaceflight which launched on 13 September 2017. It transported three members of the Expedition 53 crew to the International Space Station. Soyuz MS-06 was the 135th flight of a Soyuz spacecraft. The crew consisted of a Russian commander, and two American flight engineers. It returned to Earth on 28 February 2018 after 168 days in orbit.

== Crew ==
Prime crew
Position	Crew
Commander	(Russia) Alexander Misurkin, Roscosmos; Expedition 53/54; Second spaceflight
Flight engineer	(United States) Mark T. Vande Hei, NASA; Expedition 53/54; First spaceflight
Flight engineer	(United States) Joseph M. Acaba, NASA; Expedition 53/54; Third spaceflight

Backup crew
Position	Crew
Commander	(Russia) Anton Shkaplerov, Roscosmos
Flight engineer	(United States) Scott D. Tingle, NASA
Flight engineer	(United States) Shannon Walker, NASA

External videos
- Soyuz MS-06 and ISS over Moscow on 13 September 2017.

Due to a decision to cut down the number of participating Russian astronauts in 2017, changes were made in crew assignments to the ISS. Originally set to be on Soyuz MS-04, Alexander Misurkin and Mark T. Vande Hei have been assigned to Soyuz MS-06 instead.
