= Vinogradi =

Vinogradi may refer to:

- Vinogradi, Bulgaria, a village near Sandanski
- Vinogradi Peak, a mountain peak in Kondofrey Heights, Antarctica
- Vinogradi Ludbreški, a village near Ludbreg, Croatia
- Vinogradi, Serbia, a village near Aerodrom, Kragujevac
- Vinogradi, a location near Koljane, Croatia where the Dragović monastery was rebuilt in 1777

== See also ==
- Vinograd (disambiguation)
- Vynohradiv, a town in Ukraine
