= Sputnik 40 =

- Mission type: Amateur radio
- Operator: Aéro-Club de France; AMSAT; Rosaviakosmos
- COSPAR ID: 1997-058C
- SATCAT no.: 24958
- Mission duration: 1-2 months

Spacecraft properties
- Launch mass: 4 kilograms (8.8 lb)

Start of mission
- Launch date: 5 October 1997, 15:08:57 UTC
- Rocket: Soyuz-U
- Launch site: Baikonur 1/5
- Deployed from: Mir
- Deployment date: 3 November 1997, 04:05 UTC

End of mission
- Last contact: 29 December 1997
- Decay date: 21 May 1998

Orbital parameters
- Reference system: Geocentric
- Regime: Low Earth
- Perigee altitude: 376 kilometres (234 mi)
- Apogee altitude: 382 kilometres (237 mi)
- Inclination: 51.6 degrees
- Epoch: 4 November 1997

Sputnik 40 (Russian: Спутник 40, French: Spoutnik 40), also known as Sputnik Jr, PS-2 and Radio Sputnik 17 (RS-17), was a Franco-Russian amateur radio satellite which was launched in 1997 to commemorate the fortieth anniversary of the launch of Sputnik 1, the world's first artificial satellite. A 4-kilogram (8.8 lb) one-third scale model of Sputnik 1, Sputnik 40 was deployed from the Mir space station on 3 November 1997. Built by students, the spacecraft was constructed at the Polytechnic Laboratory of Nalchik in Kabardino-Balkaria, whilst its transmitter was assembled by Jules Reydellet College in Réunion with technical support from AMSAT-France.

== Launch ==
Sputnik 40 was launched, along with a backup spacecraft and the X-Mir inspection satellite, aboard Progress M-36 at 15:08 UTC on 5 October 1997. A Soyuz-U carrier rocket placed the spacecraft into orbit, flying from 1/5 at the Baikonur Cosmodrome in Kazakhstan: the same launch pad used by Sputnik 1. Progress M-36 docked to Mir on 8 October, and the satellites were transferred to the space station. At 04:05 UTC on 3 November, during an extra-vehicular activity, Sputnik 40 was deployed by cosmonauts Anatoly Solovyev and Pavel Vinogradov.

== Orbit ==
On 4 November, the day after it was deployed, Sputnik 40 was in a low Earth orbit with a perigee of 376 kilometres (234 mi), an apogee of 382 kilometres (237 mi), an inclination of 51.6 degrees, and a period of 92.13 minutes. The satellite was given the International Designator 1997-058C, and was catalogued by the United States Space Command as 24958. It ceased operations on 29 December 1997 when its batteries expired, and subsequently decayed from orbit on 21 May 1998. The backup satellite remained aboard Mir, and was destroyed when Mir was deorbited on 23 March 2001.

== See also ==
- 1997 in spaceflight
