= Alexander Misurkin =

Russian cosmonaut (born 1977)

- Александр Мисуркин
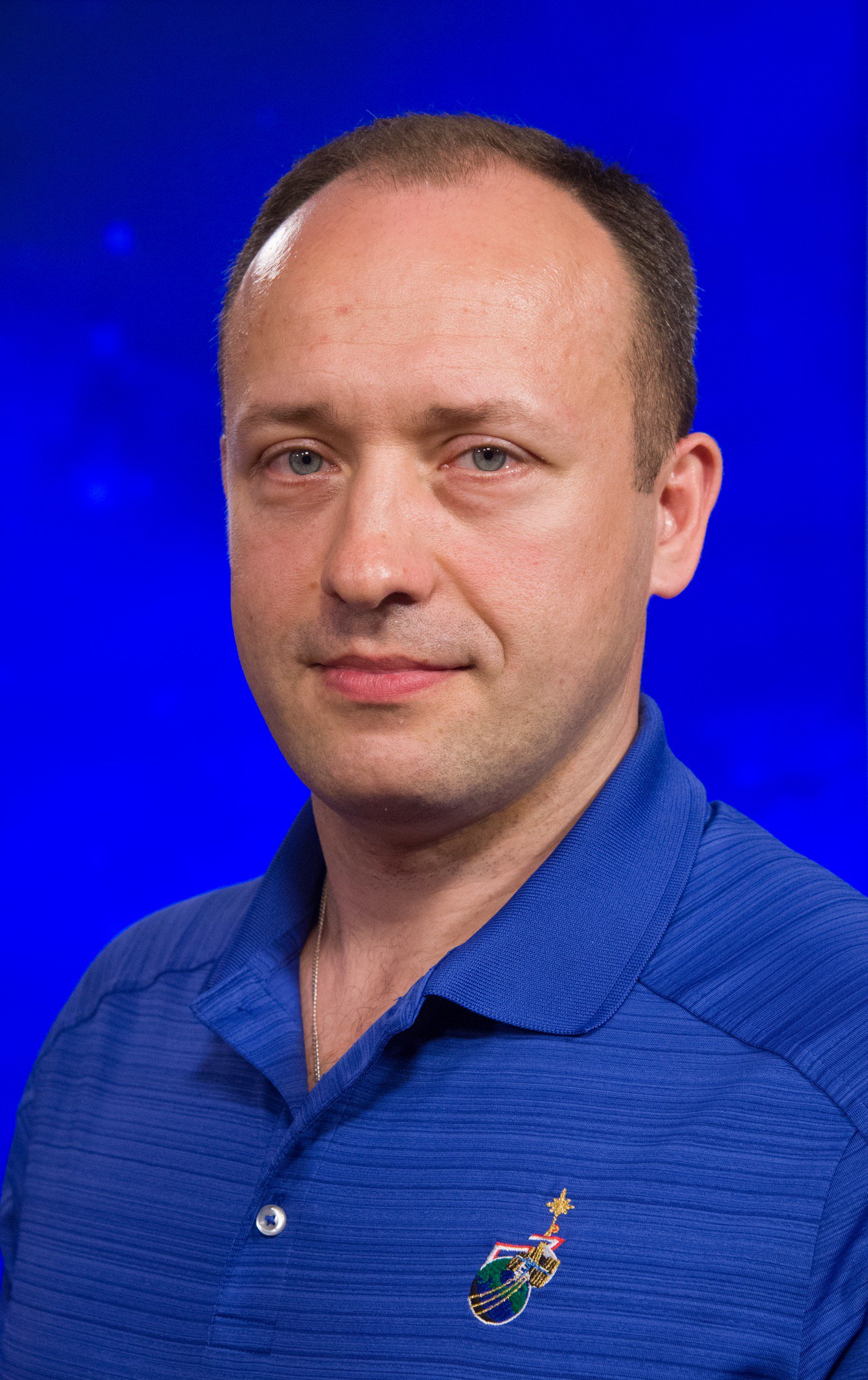
- Aleksandr Misurkin pictured in 2017
- Born: 23 September 1977 (age 49); Yershichi, Smolensk Oblast, Russian SFSR, Soviet Union
- Occupations: Major, Russian Air Force
- Space career

Roscosmos cosmonaut
- Status: Retired
- Time in space: 346 days 07 hours 04 minutes
- Selection: 2006 TsPK-14 Cosmonaut Group
- Total EVAs: 4
- Total EVA time: 28 hours and 14 minutes
- Missions: Soyuz TMA-08M (Expedition 35/36), Soyuz MS-06 (Expedition 53/54), Soyuz MS-20
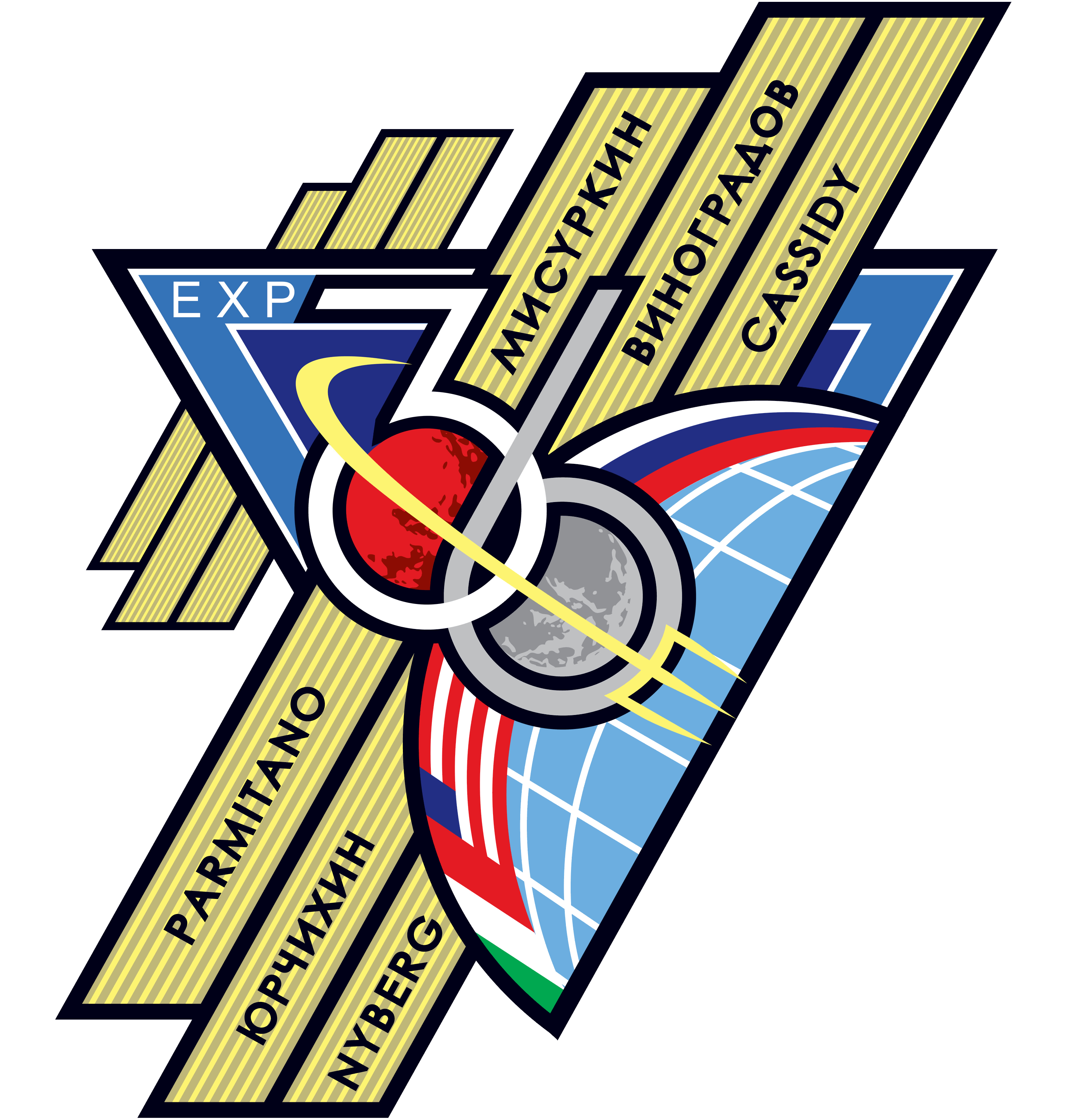
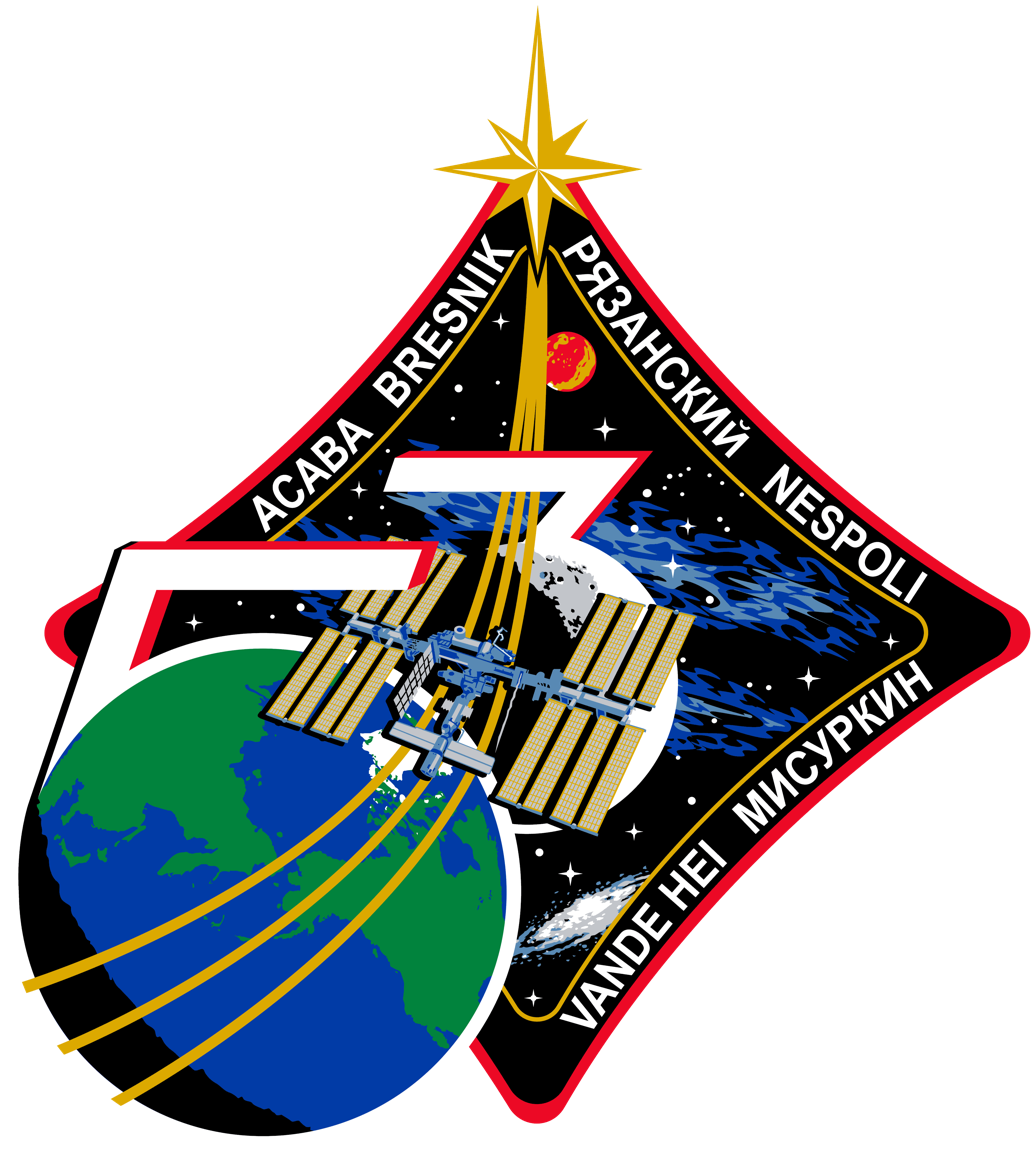
- Mission insignia
- Retired: March 31, 2022

Alexander Alexanderovich Misurkin (Russian: Aлександр Aлександрович Мисуркин) (born 23 September 1977), a major in the Russian Air Force, is a former Russian cosmonaut, selected in 2006. He flew aboard Soyuz TMA-08M on 28 March 2013 as his first space mission and launched on Soyuz MS-06 as his second flight in 2017. He was commander of the International Space Station for Expedition 54.

== Personal ==
Misurkin is married to Olga Anatolievna Misurkina. The couple has two children. His parents, Lyudmila Georgievna and Alexander Mikhailovich Misurkin, reside in Oryol, Russia.

== Education ==
In 1994, Misurkin graduated from vocational school #1 in Oryol. He then entered the Kacha High Air Force Pilot School, where he studied to September 1998. He continued pilot training at the Armavir Military Aviation Institute, and graduated in October 1999 with a gold medal as a pilot-engineer.

== Cosmonaut career ==
In October 2006, Misurkin was approved as a cosmonaut candidate and enlisted in the Yuri Gagarin Cosmonaut Training Center (GCTC) cosmonaut corps. He took the basic training at GCTC from February 2007 to June 2009, which he completed on 2 June 2009. Misurkin was qualified as a test-cosmonaut 9 June 2009.

From August 2009 to February 2011 he took advanced training specializing in the International Space Station (ISS) program. From January 2011 he trained as the Expedition 33/34 and Soyuz TMA-M backup crew flight engineer.

In 2014, he participated in the ESA CAVES mission of the European Space Agency alongside Scott Tingle, Luca Parmitano, Sergey Kud-Sverchkov and Matthias Maurer.

=== Soyuz TMA-08M / Expedition 35/36 ===
Misurkin flew on Soyuz TMA-08M which launched at 20:43:20 on 28 March 2013. This was the first crewed flight to use the fast rendezvous approach to the International Space Station, reaching the space station in less than 6 hours. Previous flights had required two days to dock with the station. Misurkin joined the crew of ISS Expedition 35.

=== Soyuz MS-06 / Expedition 53/54 ===
On 2 February 2018, Misurkin along with flight engineer Anton Shkaplerov participated in an 8-hour 13 minute spacewalk outside of the ISS to replace an old electronics box for a high-gain communications antenna. At completion, the two cosmonauts set a new record for the longest Russian spacewalk to date.

=== Soyuz MS-20 ===
In December 2021, Misurkin commanded Soyuz MS-20 to the ISS. Unlike previous spaceflights, which carried ISS Expedition members, this carried two space tourists, Yusaku Maezawa and Yozo Hirano, to space for 12 days. The three landed successfully on 20 December.

Statistics

| # | Spacecraft launch | Launch date | Mission | Spacecraft landing | Landing date | Duration | Spacewalks | Spacewalk duration |
|---|---|---|---|---|---|---|---|---|
| 1 | Soyuz TMA-08M | 28 March 2013, 20:43 UTC | ISS-35 / ISS-36 | Soyuz TMA 08M | 11 September 2013, 02:58 UTC | 166 days 06 hours 15 minutes | 3 | 20 hours 01 minute |
| 2 | Soyuz MS-06 | 12 September 2017, 21:17 UTC | ISS-53 / ISS-54 | Soyuz MS-06 | 28 February 2018, 02:31 UTC | 168 days 05 hours 14 minutes | 1 | 8 hours 13 minutes |
| 3 | Soyuz MS-20 | 8 December 2021, 07:38 UTC | - | Soyuz MS-20 | 20 December 2021, 03:13 UTC | 11 days 19 hours 35 minutes | 0 | - |
| | | | | | | 346 days 07 hours 04 minutes | 4 | 28 hours 14 minutes |

== See also ==
- List of Heroes of the Russian Federation

| Preceded by Randolph Bresnik | ISS Commander (Expedition 53); 14 December 2017 to 28 February 2018 | Succeeded by Anton Shkaplerov |
