= Christopher Cassidy =

American astronaut (born 1970)

Chris Cassidy
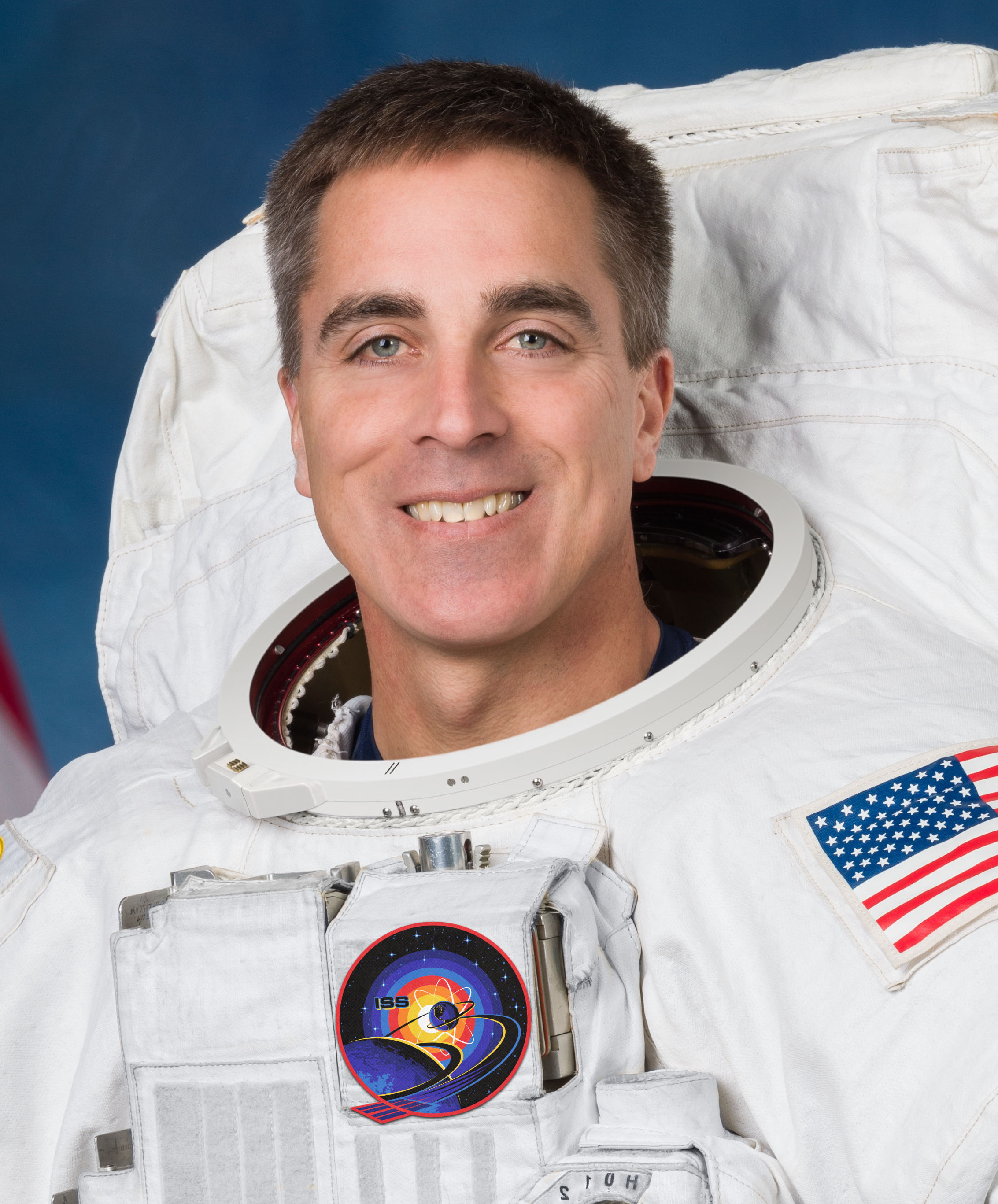
- Official portrait, 2020
- Born: Christopher John Cassidy; January 4, 1970 (age 56); Salem, Massachusetts, U.S.
- Education: United States Naval Academy (BS); Massachusetts Institute of Technology (MS)
- Spouse: Peggy Yancer
- Space career

NASA astronaut
- Rank: Captain, USN
- Time in space: 377d 17h 49m
- Selection: NASA Group 19 (2004)
- Total EVAs: 10
- Total EVA time: 54h 51m
- Missions: STS-127; Soyuz TMA-08M (Expedition 35/36); Soyuz MS-16 (Expedition 62/63)
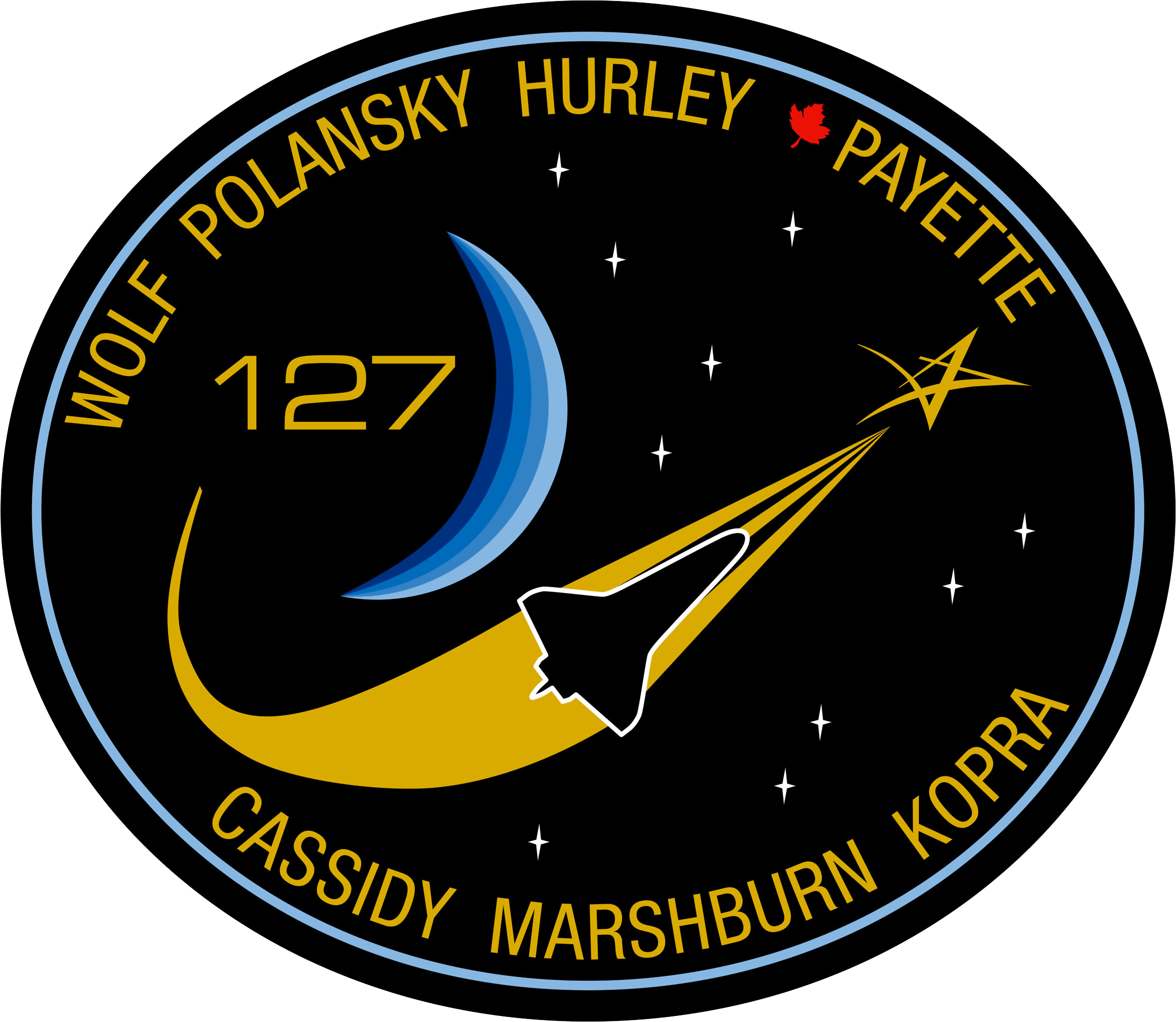
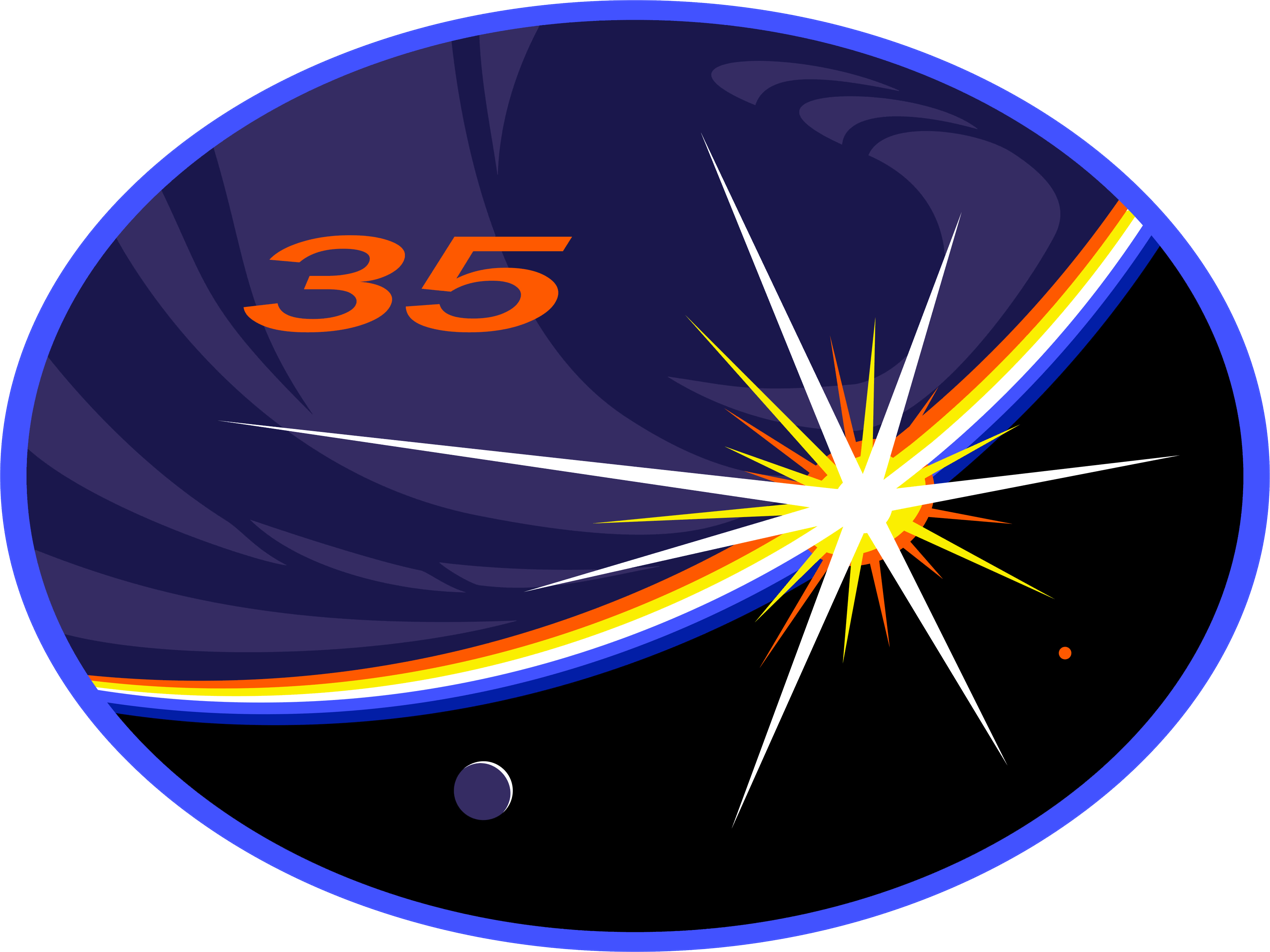
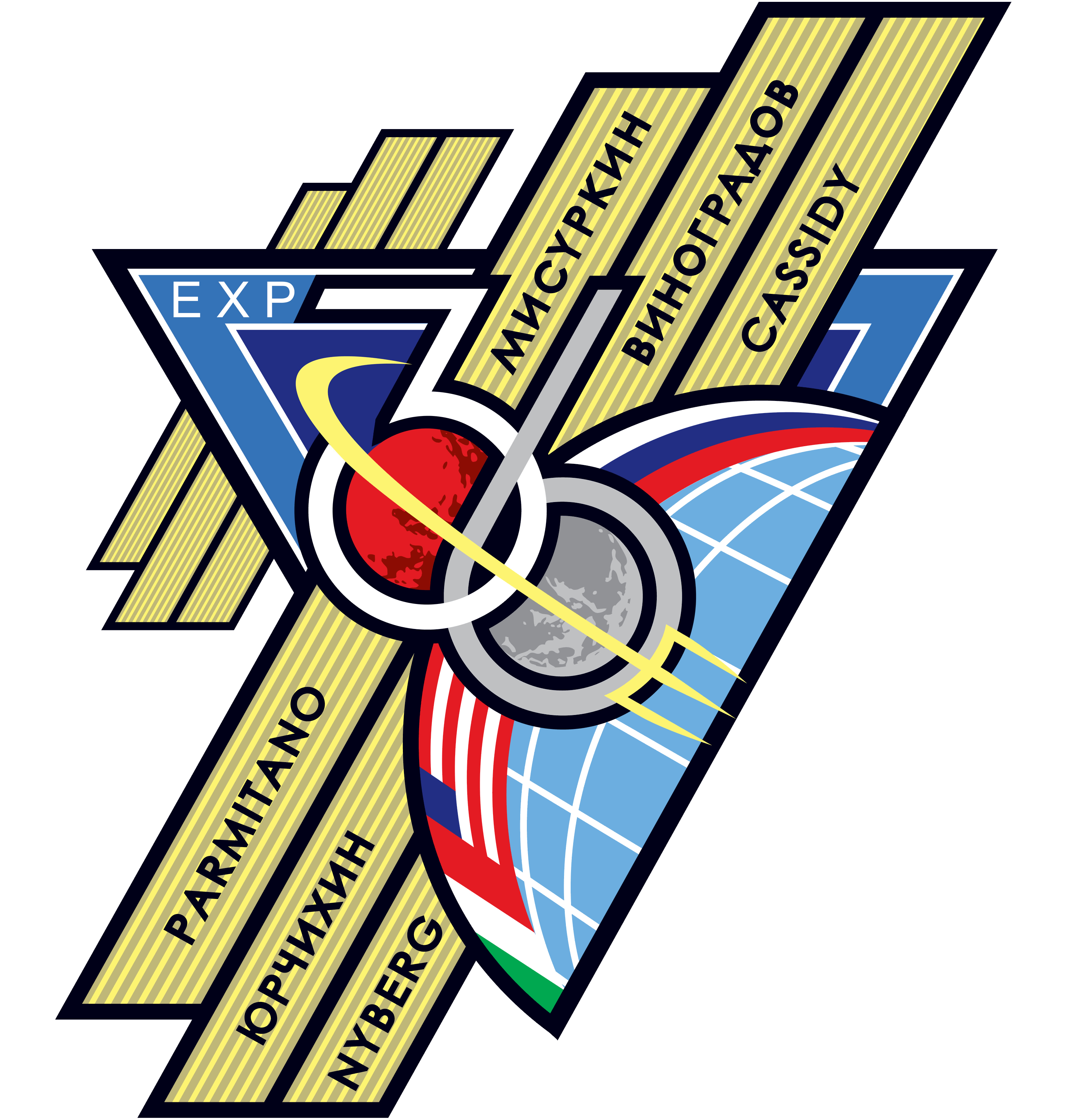
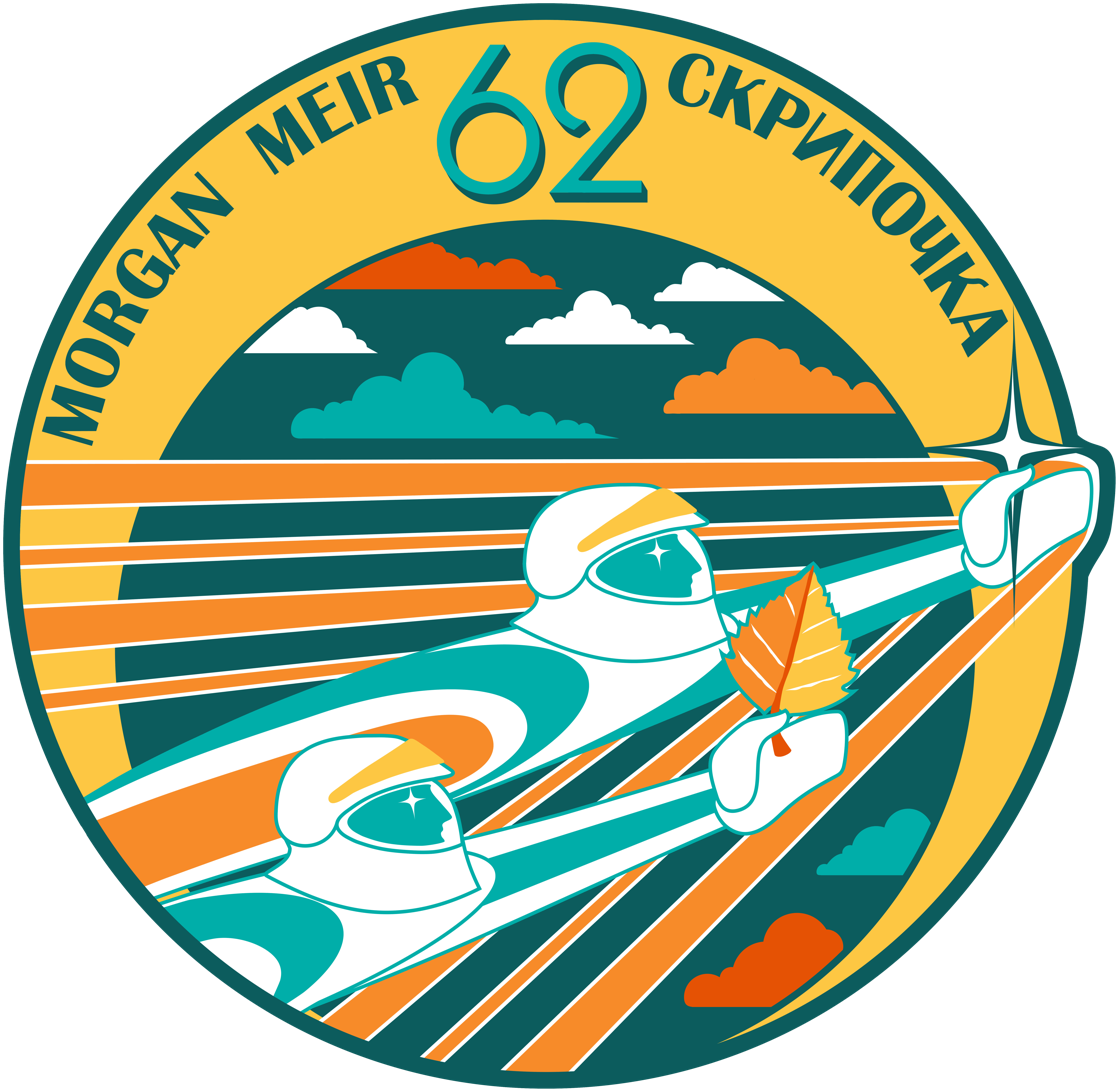
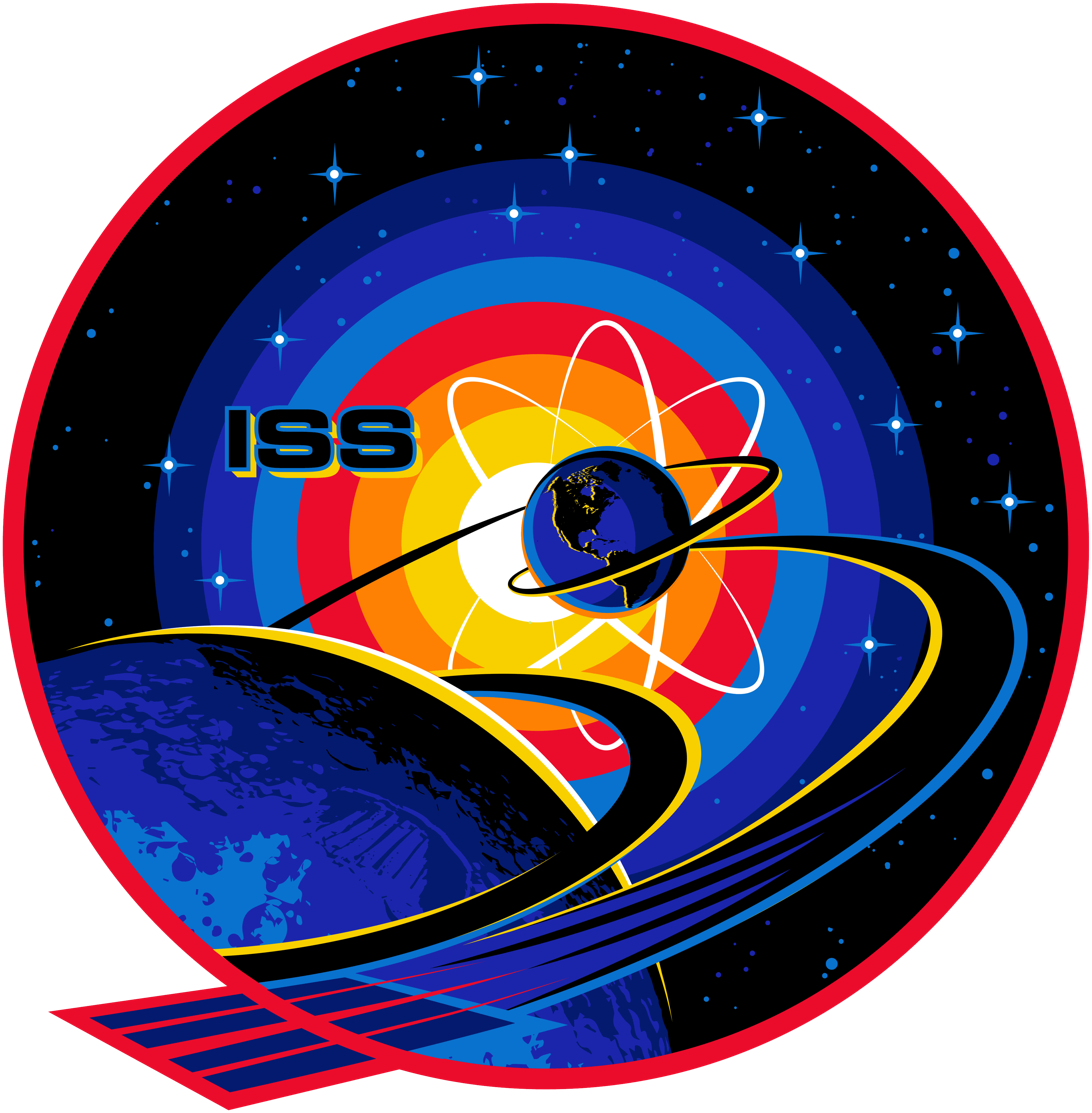
- Mission insignia
- Retired: May 28, 2021
- Website: astroseal.net

Christopher John Cassidy (born January 4, 1970) is an American retired NASA astronaut and United States Navy SEAL. He achieved the rank of captain in the U.S. Navy. His first spaceflight was on a Space Shuttle mission in 2009. He was the chief of the Astronaut Office at NASA from July 2015 until June 2017.

== Early life and education ==
Cassidy was born in Salem, Massachusetts on January 4, 1970. He attended York High School, in York, Maine. He then graduated from the Naval Academy Preparatory School in Newport, Rhode Island in 1989. He received a Bachelor of Science degree in mathematics from the United States Naval Academy in 1993 and a Master of Science degree in ocean engineering at the Massachusetts Institute of Technology in 2000.

== Military career ==
Cassidy graduated from BUD/S class 192 in 1993 as Honor man. He served for ten years as a member of the Navy SEALs. His specializations in military tactics include long range special reconnaissance (vehicular and foot patrols), direct action building assaults, non-compliant ship-boardings, desert reconnaissance patrols, combat diving, underwater explosives, and a variety of air operations, including parachuting, fast roping, and rappelling. He made four six-month deployments: two to Afghanistan, and two to the Mediterranean Sea. Cassidy served as Executive Officer and Operations Officer of Special Boat Team 20 in Norfolk, Virginia, and SEAL Platoon Commander at SEAL Team 3 in Coronado, California. He deployed to the Afghanistan region two weeks after the September 11 attacks. He served as Ground Assault Force Commander for international and U.S.-only combat missions in Afghanistan. Cassidy led two months of non-compliant ship-boardings in the Northern Persian Gulf. Cassidy was also a SEAL Delivery Vehicle (SDV) platoon commander at SEAL Delivery Vehicle Team Two in Norfolk. He accumulated over 200 hours underwater as pilot, navigator, or mission commander of a two-man flooded submersible SDV, which is launched and recovered from a host-ship submarine. He also served as drydeck shelter platoon commander at SEAL Delivery Vehicle Team Two in Norfolk. Cassidy volunteered for and completed a week-long, 180-mile (290 km) charity kayak paddle from Norfolk, Virginia to Washington, D.C. to raise money and awareness for the Special Operations Warrior Foundation.

== NASA career ==
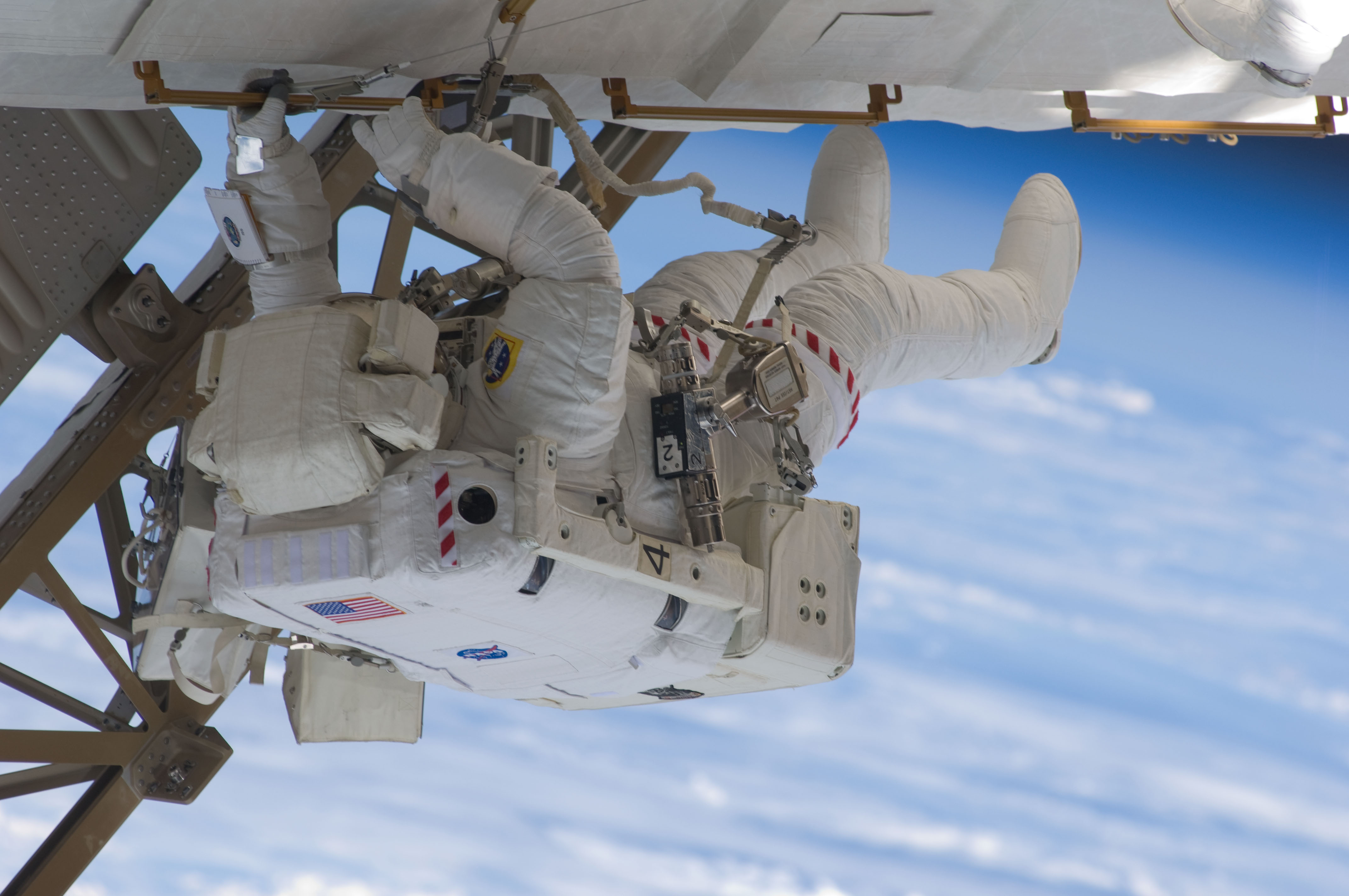
Cassidy participating in the third EVA of the STS-127 mission

Cassidy was selected as an astronaut candidate by NASA in May 2004. In February 2006 he completed Astronaut Candidate Training, which included scientific and technical briefings, intensive instruction in Space Shuttle and International Space Station systems, physiological training, T-38 Talon flight training, and water and wilderness survival training. Completion of this initial training qualified him for various technical assignments within the Astronaut Office and future flight assignment as a mission specialist.

=== STS-127 ===
In February 2008, Cassidy was assigned to his first spaceflight as a mission specialist on STS-127, a Space Shuttle mission to deliver the Exposed Facility of the Japanese Experiment Module (JEM-EF) to the ISS aboard Space Shuttle Endeavour.

Cassidy and his six fellow crew members lifted off aboard Endeavour from the Kennedy Space Center on July 15, 2009. The seven astronauts docked with the ISS on July 17, joining the six-person Expedition 20 crew commanded by Russian cosmonaut Gennady Padalka. This marked the first time that 13 people had been in space together simultaneously. On July 22, 2009, Cassidy stepped outside the ISS with NASA astronaut David Wolf for his first spacewalk. The two began work replacing batteries on the P6 Truss and continued work on installing the JEM-EF. The EVA was called off after 5 hours and 59 minutes for excess carbon dioxide in Cassidy's suit.

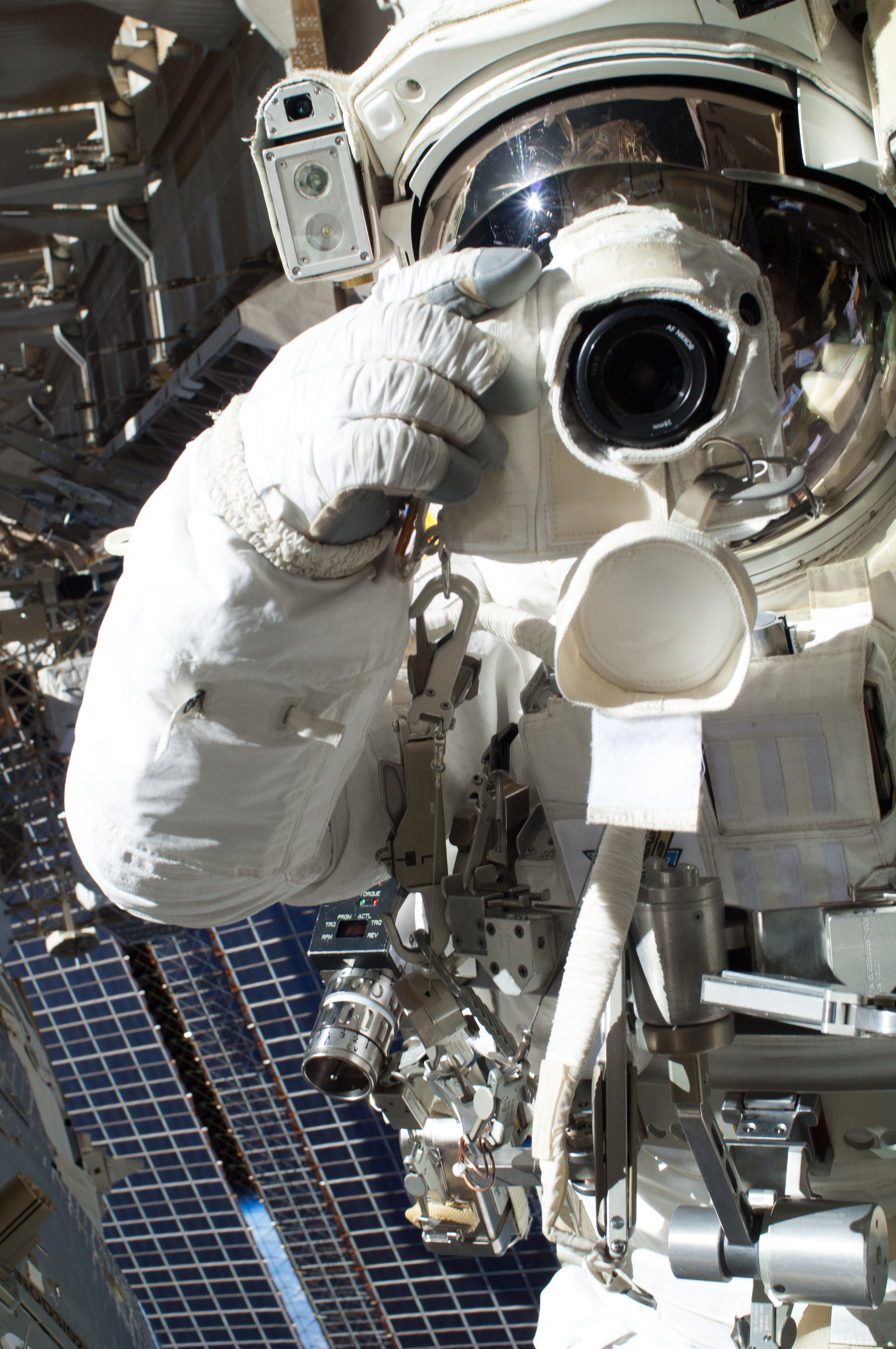
Cassidy's space selfie

Over the course of STS-127, Cassidy participated in two more spacewalks with NASA astronaut Thomas Marshburn. The two completed replacing the batteries on the P6 truss and completed the installation of the JEM-EF during two excursions lasting 7 hours and 12 minutes and 4 hours and 57 minutes, respectively. Cassidy's third spacewalk marked the completion of the Japanese Experiment Module, a feat that took three space shuttle missions starting with STS-123.

On July 31, 2009, Cassidy returned to the KSC Shuttle Landing Facility, wrapping up his first spaceflight after 15 days in space.

=== Expedition 35/36 ===
Cassidy was assigned to the Expedition 35 crew as a flight engineer and flew to the ISS aboard Soyuz TMA-08M (US designation: 34S), which launched on March 28, 2013. On May 11, 2013, Cassidy and Thomas Marshburn performed an unplanned spacewalk to replace a pump controller box suspected to be the source of an ammonia coolant leak.

Cassidy participated in two US spacewalks from the ISS in June/July 2013. On July 16, 2013, he was joined by Luca Parmitano on a spacewalk. The EVA was cut short when Parmitano reported water floating behind his head inside his helmet. During the EVA, Cassidy took his space selfie. That photo became one of the best selfies of 2013 listed by many news sites.

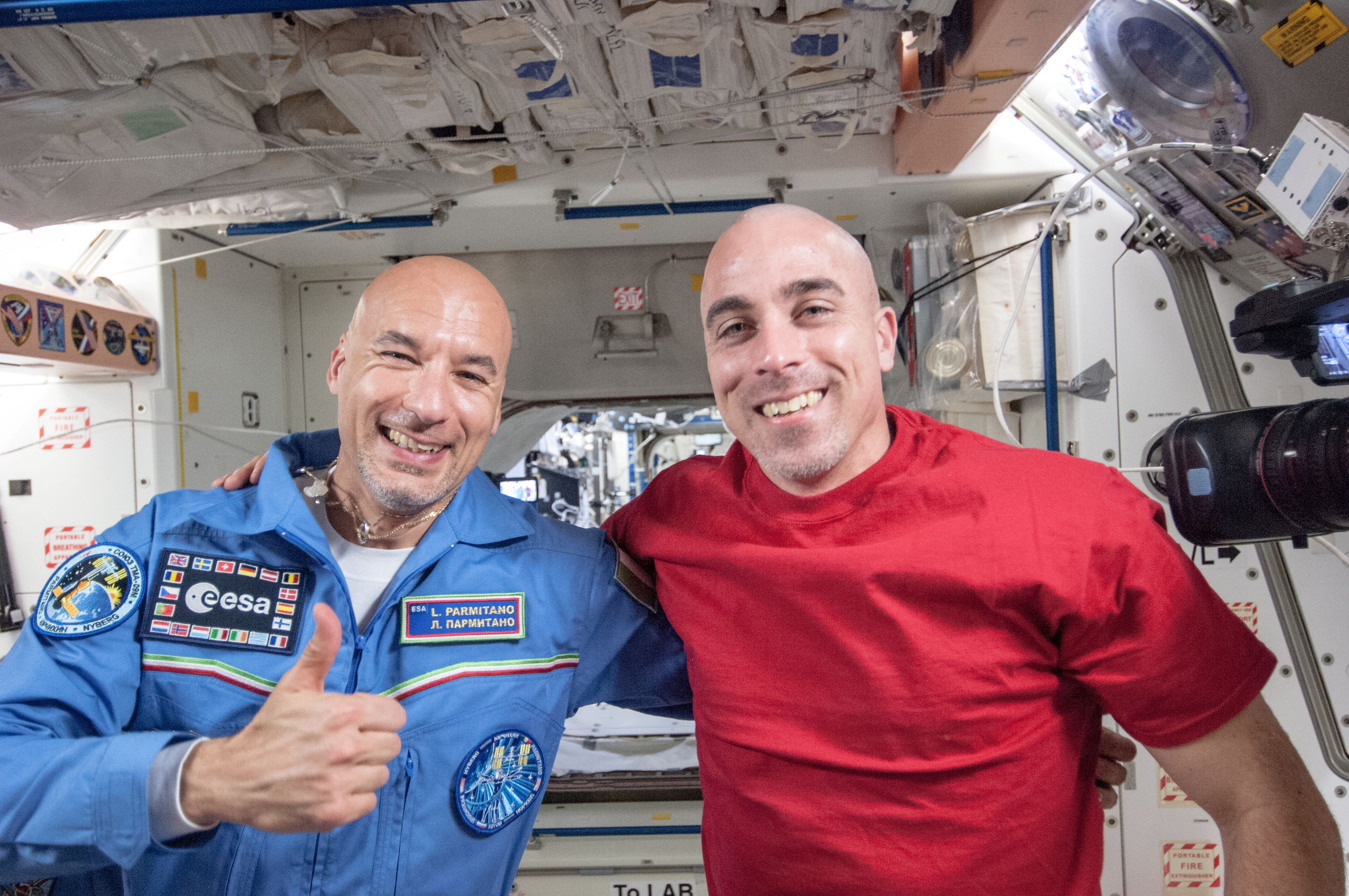
Cassidy (right), pictured with crew member Luca Parmitano

=== Chief of the Astronaut Office ===
Cassidy was named the 15th Chief of the Astronaut Office at NASA in July 2015, succeeding Bob Behnken.

On June 2, 2017, Cassidy was replaced by Patrick G. Forrester as Chief of the Astronaut Office and was returned to normal flight status.

=== Expedition 62/63 ===
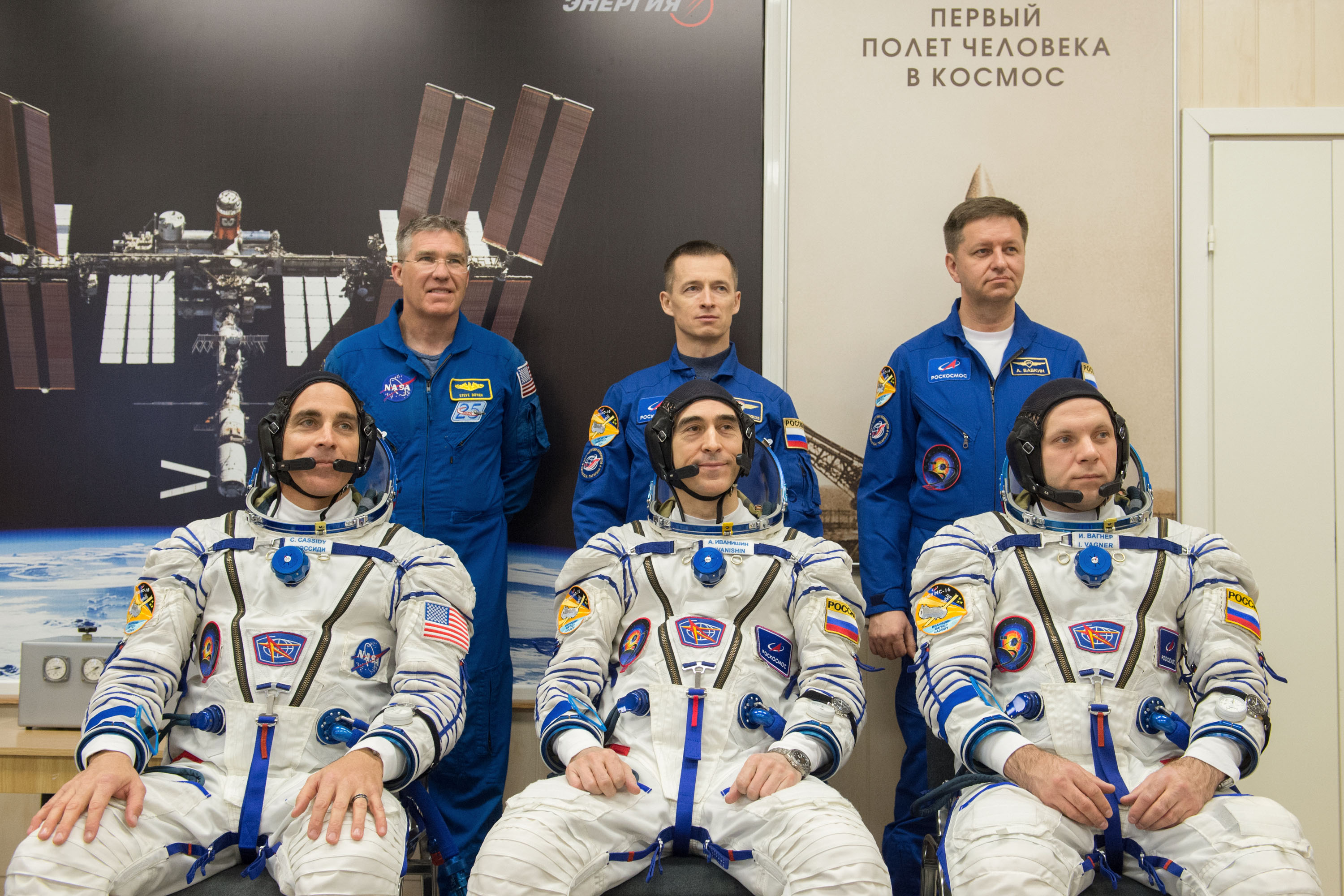
Cassidy, Ivanishin and Vagner at the Baikonur Cosmodrome in Kazakhstan, April 9, 2020

Cassidy launched onboard Soyuz MS-16 on April 9, 2020, as part of Expedition 62. He was the ISS commander for Expedition 63, which consisted of Cassidy and Russian cosmonauts Ivan Vagner and Anatoli Ivanishin. Cassidy was joined by fellow NASA astronauts Doug Hurley and Bob Behnken on May 31, 2020, with the docking of Crew Dragon Demo-2. Cassidy and his crew returned to Earth on October 21, 2020. They landed in Dzhezkazgan, Kazakhstan at 10:54 pm.

Cassidy's last two years as an astronaut were the central feature of the Disney+ docuseries Among the Stars. The series was removed from Disney+ on May 26, 2023, amidst the Disney+ and Hulu purge.

== Post-NASA career ==
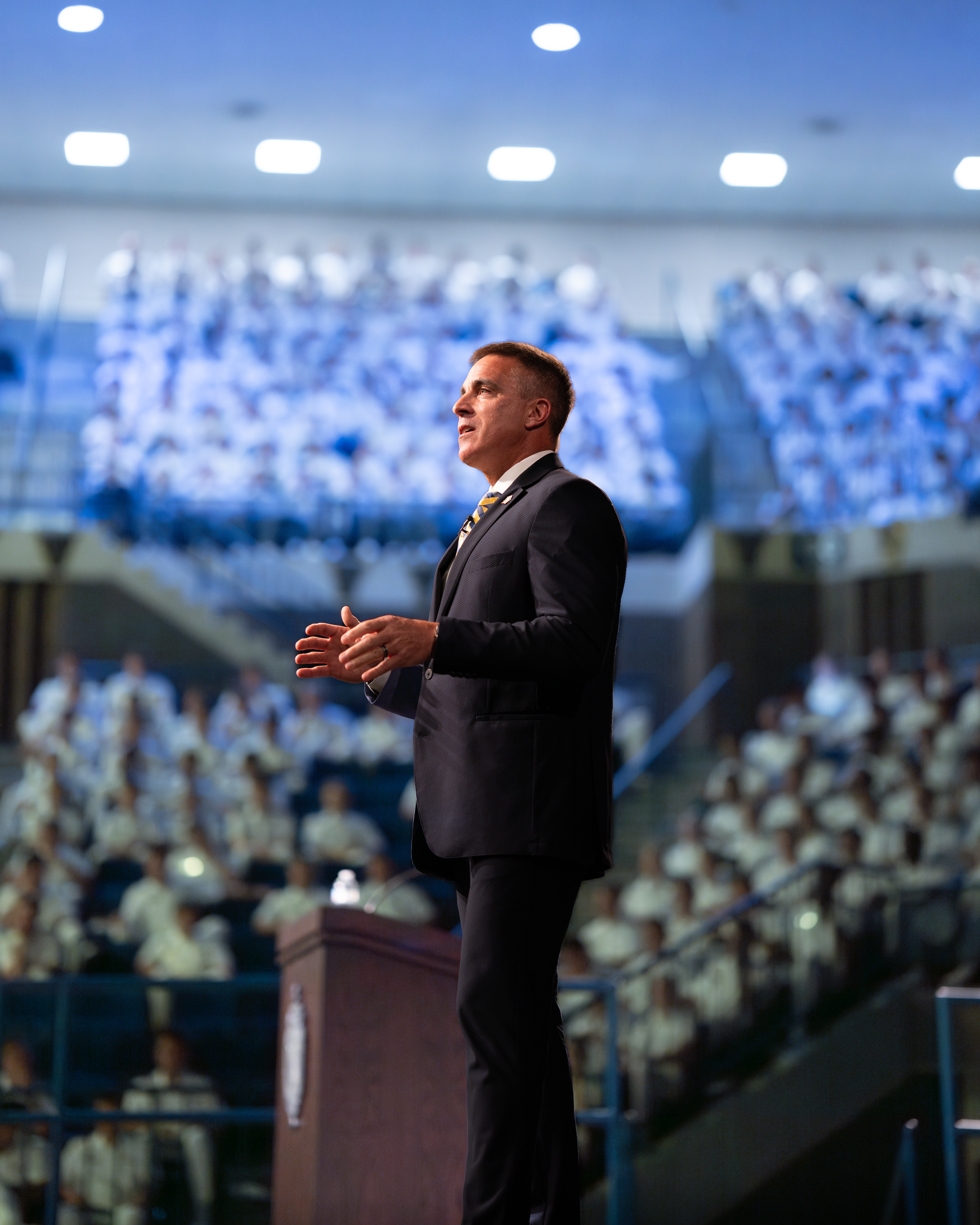
Cassidy speaking at the United States Naval Academy in September 2024

Cassidy joined the National Medal of Honor Museum Foundation as President and CEO in August 2021 after retiring from the Navy and the NASA Astronaut Corps earlier that year. Since his retirement from government service, Cassidy has also been active on the boards of directors for several non-profits, including the Navy SEAL Foundation and the John F. Kennedy Library Foundation. He also serves as an advisor for New Vista Acquisition Corp, a Special Purpose Acquisition Company (SPAC).

== Awards and honors ==
Cassidy was awarded the Bronze Star with "V" device and the Presidential Unit Citation for leading a nine-day operation at the Zhawar Kili cave complex, a national priority objective directly on the Afghan–Pakistan border, during Operation Enduring Freedom. Cassidy was a guest speaker at the USNA Combat Leadership Seminars in 2003 and 2004. He was awarded a second Bronze Star for combat leadership service in 2004 during Operation Enduring Freedom in Afghanistan.

Chris Cassidy is also the 500th person in space. He achieved this when his crewmates so designated him during the STS-127 mission. He is also the second SEAL to fly in space, following William Shepherd, a veteran of four missions.

== Awards and decorations ==
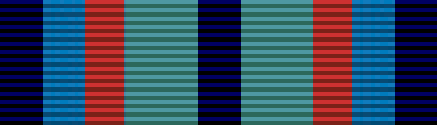
Bronze Star with valor device and award star
Combat Action Ribbon
Presidential Unit Citation
NASA Exceptional Achievement Medal
NASA Space Flight Medal
National Defense Service Medal with service star
Armed Forces Expeditionary Medal
Afghanistan Campaign Medal
Global War on Terrorism Expeditionary Medal
Sea Service Deployment Ribbon

== Personal life ==
Cassidy is married to the former Peggy Yancer from Elyria, Ohio. They have five children between the two of them. Recreational interests include traveling, biking, camping, snow skiing, weight lifting, running, basketball, real estate, and home improvement.

Cassidy is a licensed amateur radio operator (ham), holding U.S. Technician level license KF5KDR. Cassidy has participated in several Amateur Radio on the International Space Station events with students in the United States.

Cassidy announced his retirement from both the Navy and NASA Astronaut Corps on May 28, 2021.

Preceded by Robert L. Behnken	Chief of the Astronaut Office; 2015–2017	Succeeded by Patrick G. Forrester
Preceded by Oleg Skripochka	ISS Commander (Expedition 63); 15 April to 20 October 2020	Succeeded by Sergey Ryzhikov
