= Soyuz TMA-08M =

2013 Russian crewed spaceflight to the ISS

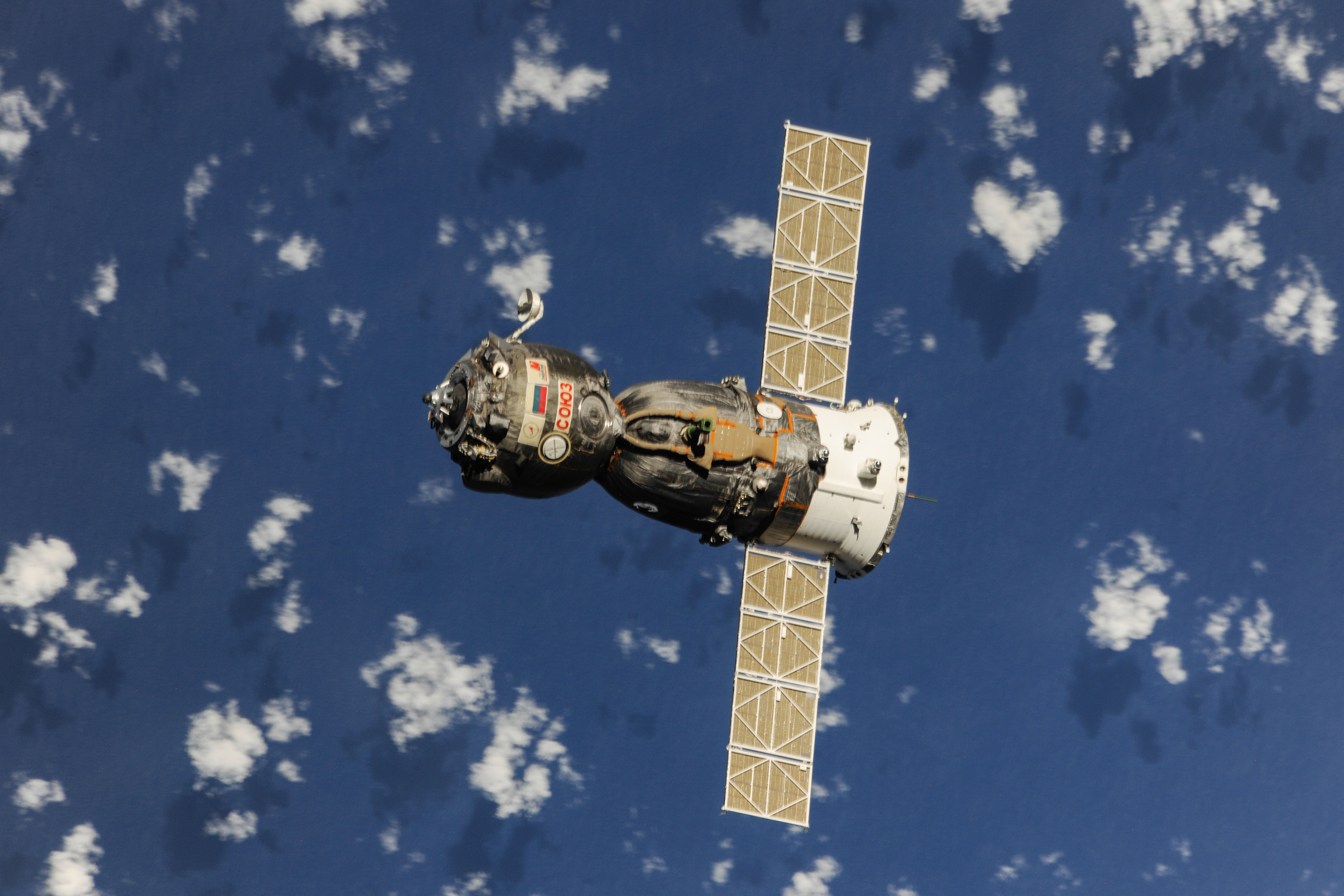
- Soyuz TMA-08M departs from the ISS, 10 September 2013
- Mission type: ISS crew rotation
- Operator: Roscosmos
- COSPAR ID: 2013-013A
- SATCAT no.: 39125
- Mission duration: 166 days, 6 hours, 15 minutes

Spacecraft properties
- Spacecraft: Soyuz 11F732A47 No.708
- Spacecraft type: Soyuz-TMA 11F747
- Manufacturer: RKK Energia

Crew
- Crew size: 3
- Members: Pavel Vinogradov; Alexander Misurkin; Christopher Cassidy
- Callsign: Карат ("Carat")

Start of mission
- Launch date: 28 March 2013, 20:43:20 UTC
- Rocket: Soyuz-FG
- Launch site: Baikonur 1/5

End of mission
- Landing date: 11 September 2013, 02:58 UTC

Orbital parameters
- Reference system: Geocentric
- Regime: Low Earth

Docking with ISS
- Docking port: Poisk zenith
- Docking date: 29 March 2013, 02:28 UTC
- Undocking date: 10 September 2013, 23:37 UTC
- Time docked: 165 days, 21 hours, 9 minutes
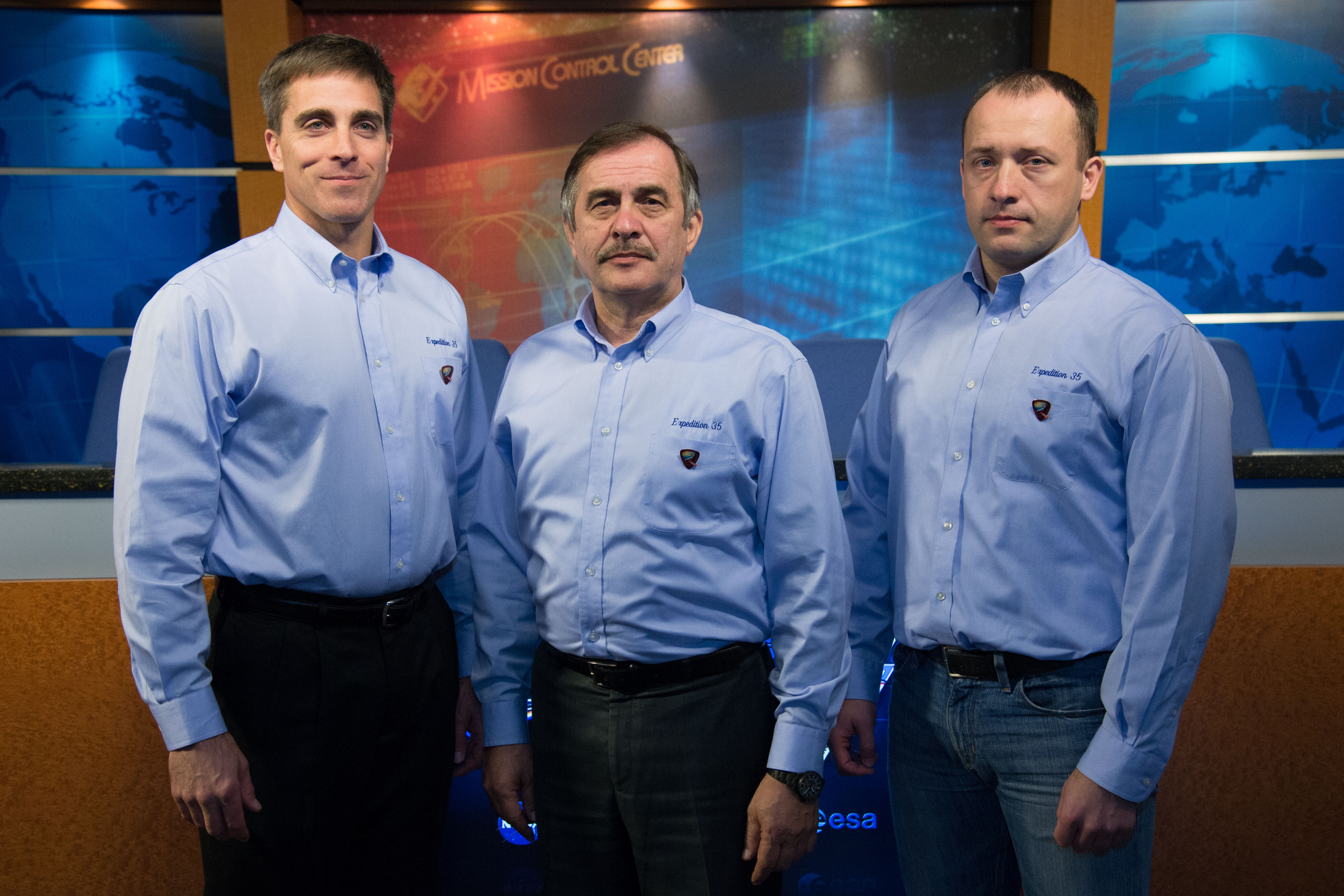
- (l-r) Cassidy, Vinogradov, and Misurkin Soyuz programme

Soyuz TMA-08M (Russian: Союз ТМА-08M meaning Union TMA-08M), identified as Soyuz 34 or 34S by NASA, was a 2013 flight to the International Space Station. It transported three members of the Expedition 35 crew to the International Space Station. TMA-08M was the 117th flight of a Soyuz spacecraft, the first flight launching in 1967.

The Russian Soyuz TMA-08M utilized the new 6-hour fast rendezvous flight profile developed by the Russian Federal Space Agency (Roscosmos) and previously tested on Progress M-16M and M-17M, instead of the usual two-day rendezvous, making it possible for crew members to leave ground facilities and board the International Space Station in less time than a typical transatlantic flight.

== Crew ==
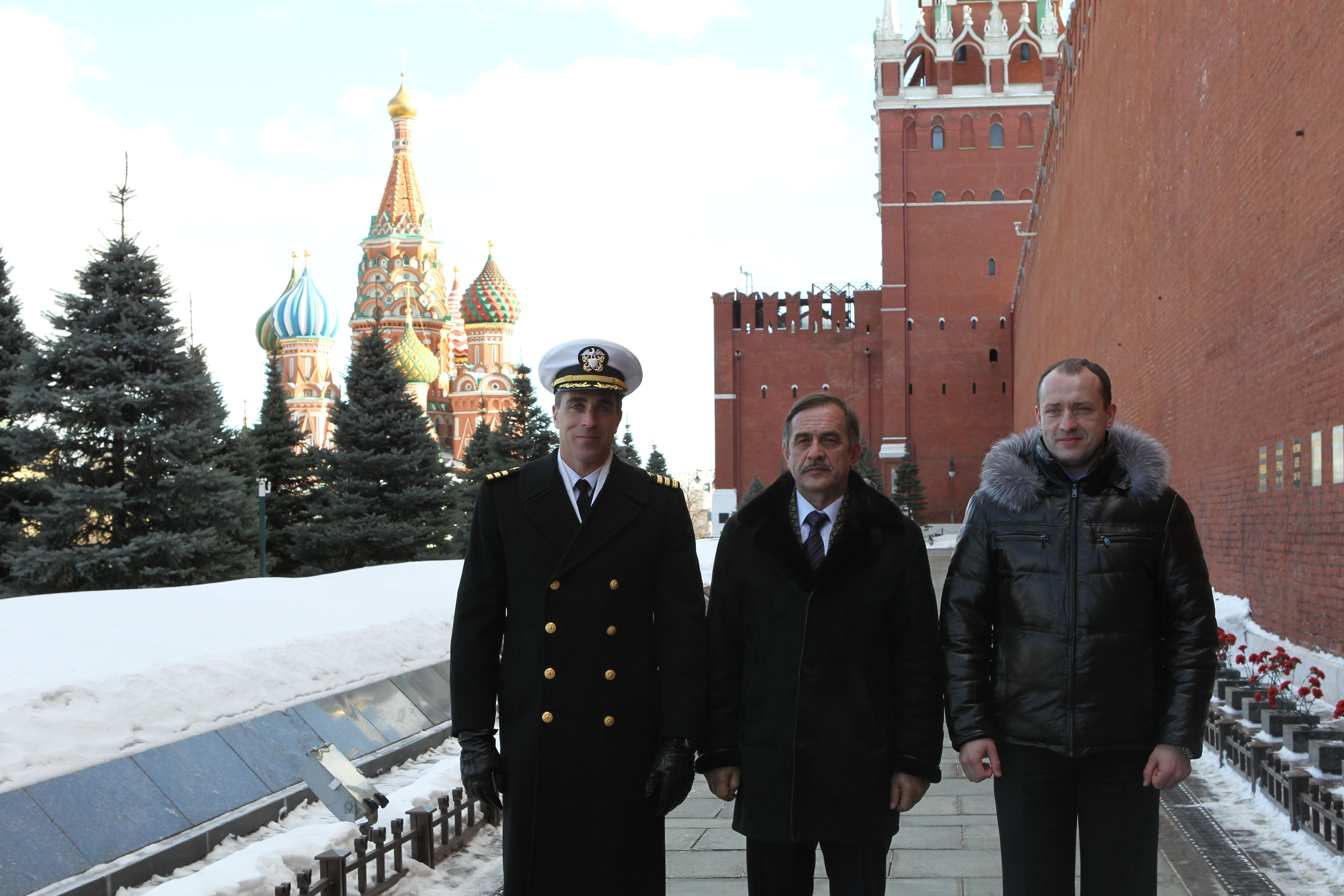
The Soyuz TMA-08M crew members conduct their ceremonial tour of Red Square on 7 March 2013.

Position	Crew Member
Commander	(Russia) Pavel Vinogradov, Roscosmos; Expedition 35; Third and last spaceflight
Flight Engineer 1	(Russia) Alexander Misurkin, Roscosmos; Expedition 35; First spaceflight
Flight Engineer 2	(United States) Christopher Cassidy, NASA; Expedition 35; Second spaceflight

=== Backup crew ===
Position	Crew Member
Commander	(Russia) Oleg Kotov, Roscosmos
Flight Engineer 1	(Russia) Sergey Ryazansky, Roscosmos
Flight Engineer 2	(United States) Michael S. Hopkins, NASA

== Launch ==
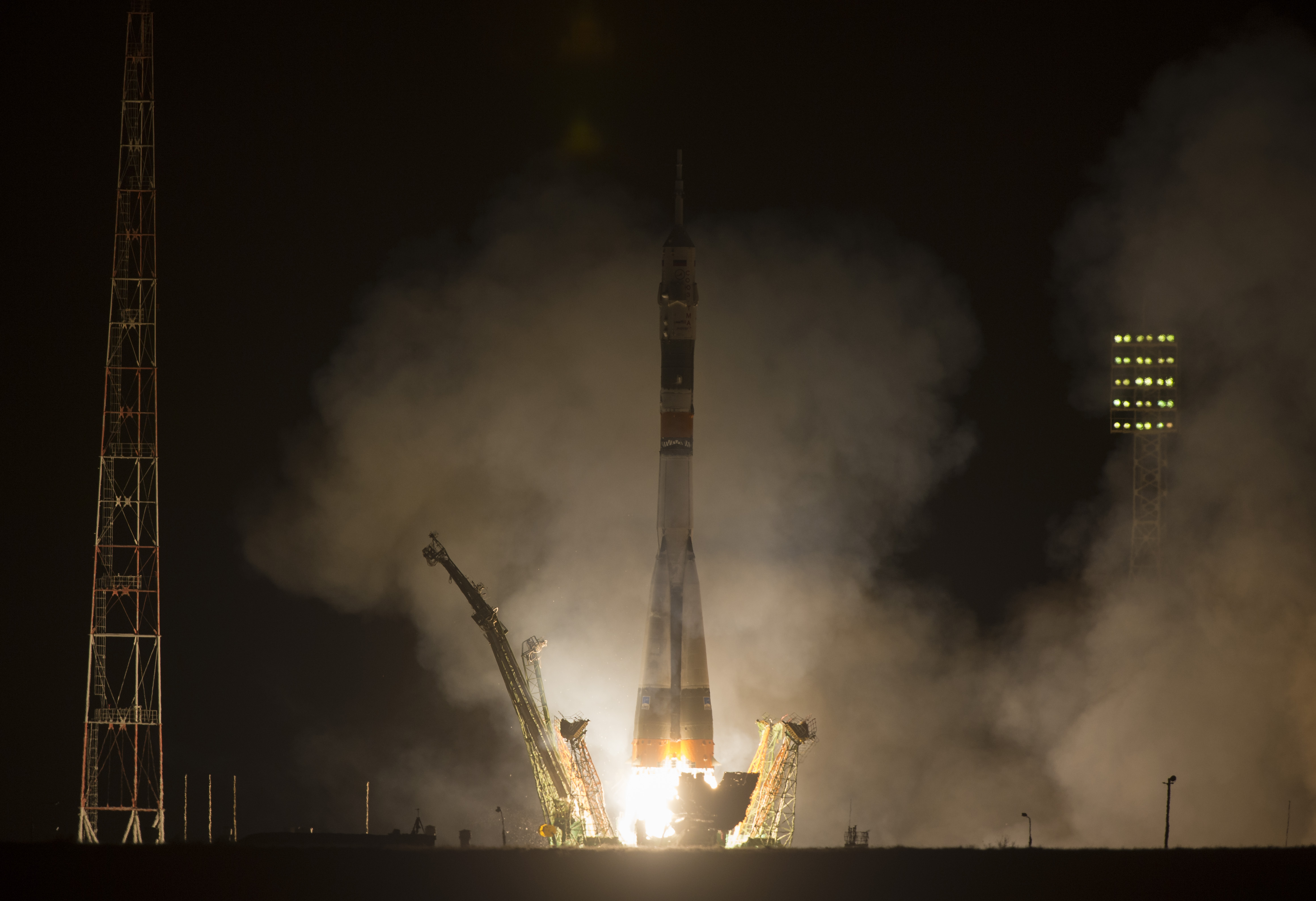
The Soyuz rocket launches from Site 1/5 at the Baikonur Cosmodrome

The rollout of the Soyuz FG Rocket occurred on 26 March 2013. After being erected into position at the launch pad, the launch vehicle was prepared for the countdown and its launch on 28 March. Final cargo items including some time-critical experiment payloads for the Russian segment of the space station were loaded into the Soyuz at the launch pad.

The Soyuz FG Rocket carrying the Soyuz TMA-08M atop was launched from Site 1/5 at the Baikonur Cosmodrome in Kazakhstan at 20:43 GMT. All stages of the Soyuz performed normally, and less than nine minutes later it delivered the Soyuz TMA-08M crew of Pavel Vinogradov, Aleksandr Misurkin, and Christopher Cassidy into orbit. For the ride into space, Soyuz Commander Vinogradov was strapped into the center seat while board engineer Misurkin and flight Engineer Chris Cassidy took the left and the right seats, respectively.

== Expedited docking ==
Following orbital insertion, Soyuz TMA-08M immediately began rendezvous operations. On the first orbit, the spacecraft executed its first two programmed engine burns. On the second orbit, actual orbital parameters were transmitted from a Russian ground site. With these parameters, Soyuz performed eight further rendezvous burns over the next five hours of flight.

The docking of Soyuz TMA-08M to the space station was accomplished after just four orbits and just under six hours post launch. The docking of the spacecraft to the MRM-2 Poisk module occurred at 2:28 GMT on 29 March 2013 slightly ahead of the schedule. The event set a new record for the fastest crewed docking for the International Space Station program. Previous Soyuz launches had taken two days.

After the hatches opened at 4:35 GMT, the newly arrived Soyuz crew was welcomed aboard the space station by Expedition 35 commander Chris Hadfield and flight engineers Thomas Marshburn and Roman Romanenko. All six crew members participated in a welcome ceremony with family members and mission officials gathered at the Russian Mission Control Center near Moscow.

== Undocking and landing ==
At the completion of the 166-day mission, the Soyuz TMA-08M spacecraft undocked from Poisk Module of the space station at 23:37 GMT on 10 September 2013. The Soyuz initiated the Deorbit Burn at 2:05 GMT and a 4 minutes 46 seconds retrograde burn of its SKD Main Propulsion System. At 2:32 GMT on 11 September, the three modules of the Soyuz separated at an altitude of 140 kilometers. Soon afterwards the Soyuz Entry Module designed to survive the reentry experienced the first traces of the atmosphere (entry interface) and gradually heat started to build up on the spacecraft's thermal protection system. At about seven minutes after entry interface, the maximum stress on the spacecraft occurred and as expected during this period of reentry communications with the Soyuz were lost.

During the following atmospheric flight, the Entry Module slowed to about 240 m/s and as it passed 10.6 Kilometers in altitude, initiated the parachute deployment sequence. Three chutes were sequentially deployed (a Pilot Chute, a Drogue Chute and the Main Chute). The deployment of the Main Chute occurred at an altitude of about 7.5 Kilometers slowing the spacecraft to 6 m/s.

The spacecraft carrying Vinogradov, Misurkin and Cassidy landed on the steppe of Kazakhstan (southeast of the town of Dzhezkazgan) at 2:58 GMT on 11 September 2013. Soon afterwards, the Soyuz Entry Module was surrounded by recovery personnel getting ready to open the hatch. First to be extracted from the spacecraft was commander Vinogradov followed by NASA astronaut Cassidy. Last to be extracted from the Entry Module was Misurkin. The three crew members were placed in reclining chairs and due to bad weather they were quickly ushered to the medical tent setup nearby.

Shortly after landing, Cassidy and Misurkin, also participated in a post-landing activity by going through a number of exercises to assess their physiological state. These tests will be used to determine how crew members would feel after landing on Mars to assess what type of activities they could perform shortly after landing. Cosmonauts Vinogradov and Misurkin were flown back to Star City, outside Moscow, while astronaut Cassidy boarded a NASA Gulfstream III aircraft to fly back to Houston.
