= Winograd =

Winograd is an East Ashkenazi Jewish surname. Notable people with the surname include:

- Arthur Winograd (1920–2010), original cello player for the Juilliard String Quartet
- Eliyahu Winograd (1926–2018), chairman of the Winograd Commission, an Israeli government-appointed commission of inquiry regarding the 2006 Lebanon War
- Michael Winograd (born 1982), klezmer clarinetist and composer
- Nathan Winograd, author of Redemption: The Myth of Pet Overpopulation and the No Kill Revolution in America
- Shmuel Winograd (1936–2019), mathematician known for the Coppersmith–Winograd algorithm
- Terry Winograd (born 1946), computer scientist
- Boris Carmi, originally Boris Winograd (1914–2002), Russian-born Israeli photographer

== See also ==
- Vinograd (disambiguation)
- Polish spelling of Vynohrad (disambiguation), villages in Ukraine
