= Pavel Vinogradov =

Russian cosmonaut (born 1953)

- Павел Виноградов
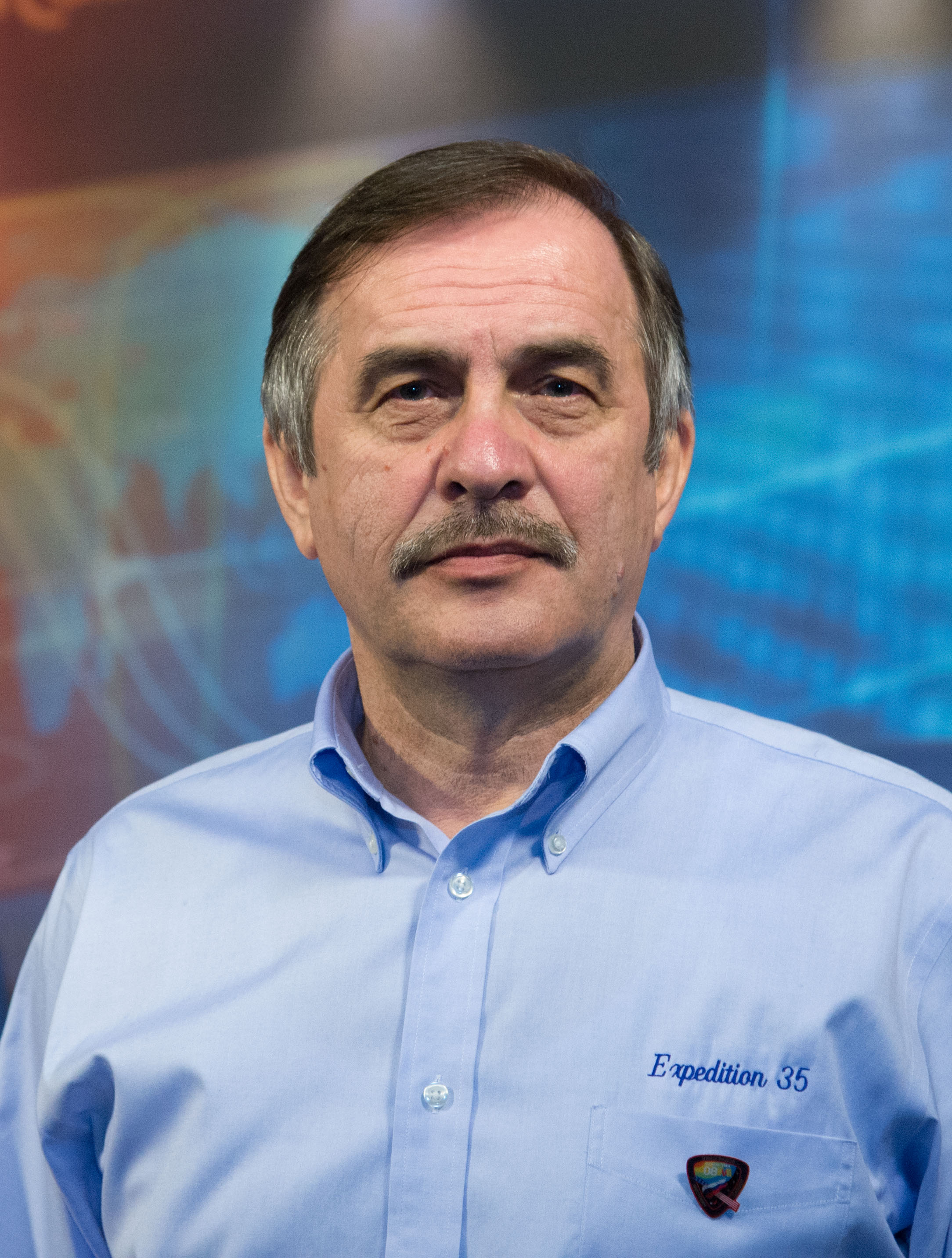
- Born: Pavel Vladimirovich Vinogradov; August 31, 1953 (age 73); Magadan, USSR
- Occupation: Engineer
- Awards: Hero of the Russian Federation
- Space career

Roscosmos cosmonaut
- Status: Retired
- Rank: Test Cosmonaut, Energia
- Time in space: 546 days, 22 hours, 32 minutes
- Selection: 1992 NPOE Cosmonaut Group
- Total EVAs: 7
- Total EVA time: 38 hours, 25 minutes
- Missions: Soyuz TM-26 (Mir EO-24), Soyuz TMA-8 (Expedition 13), Soyuz TMA-08M (Expedition 35/36)
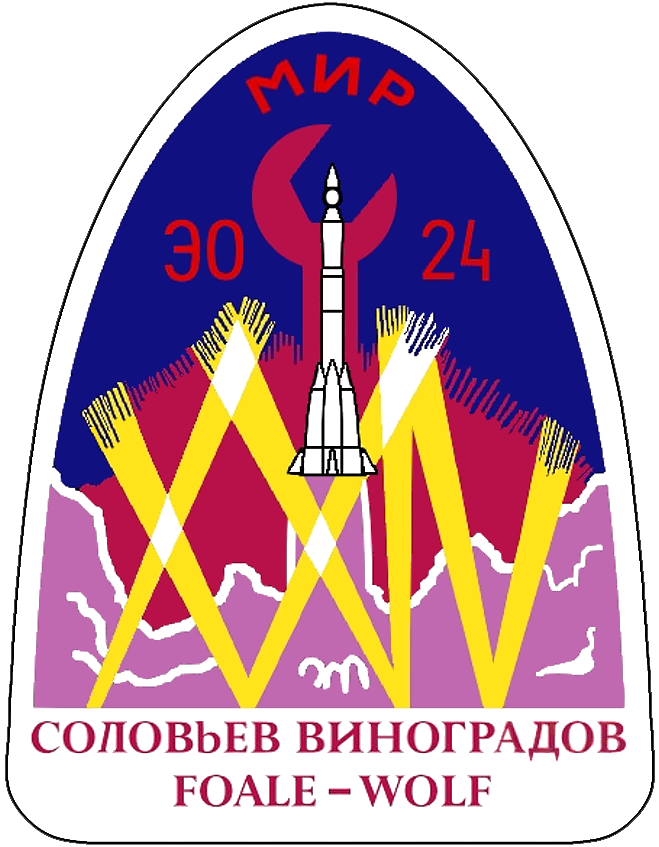
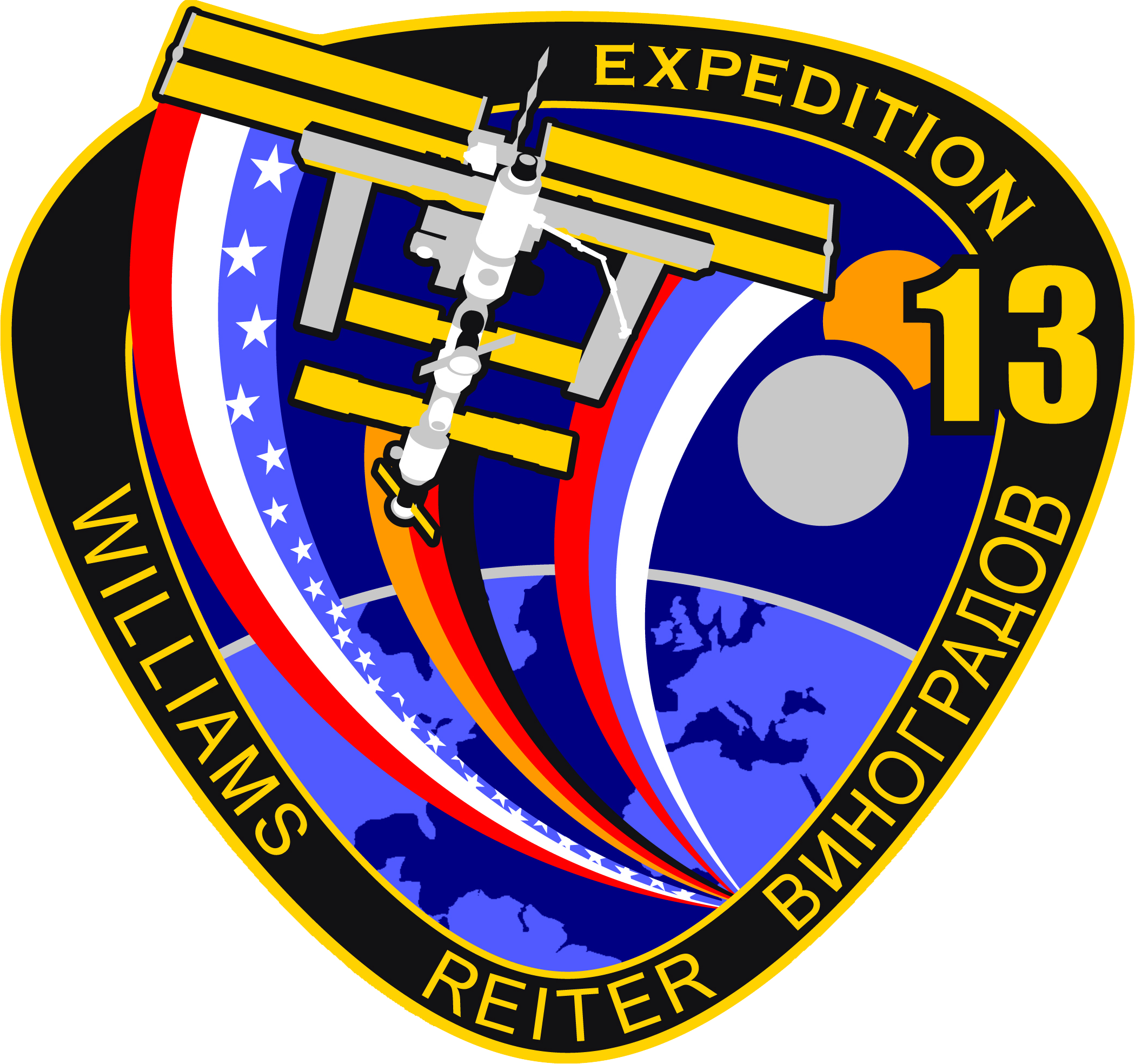
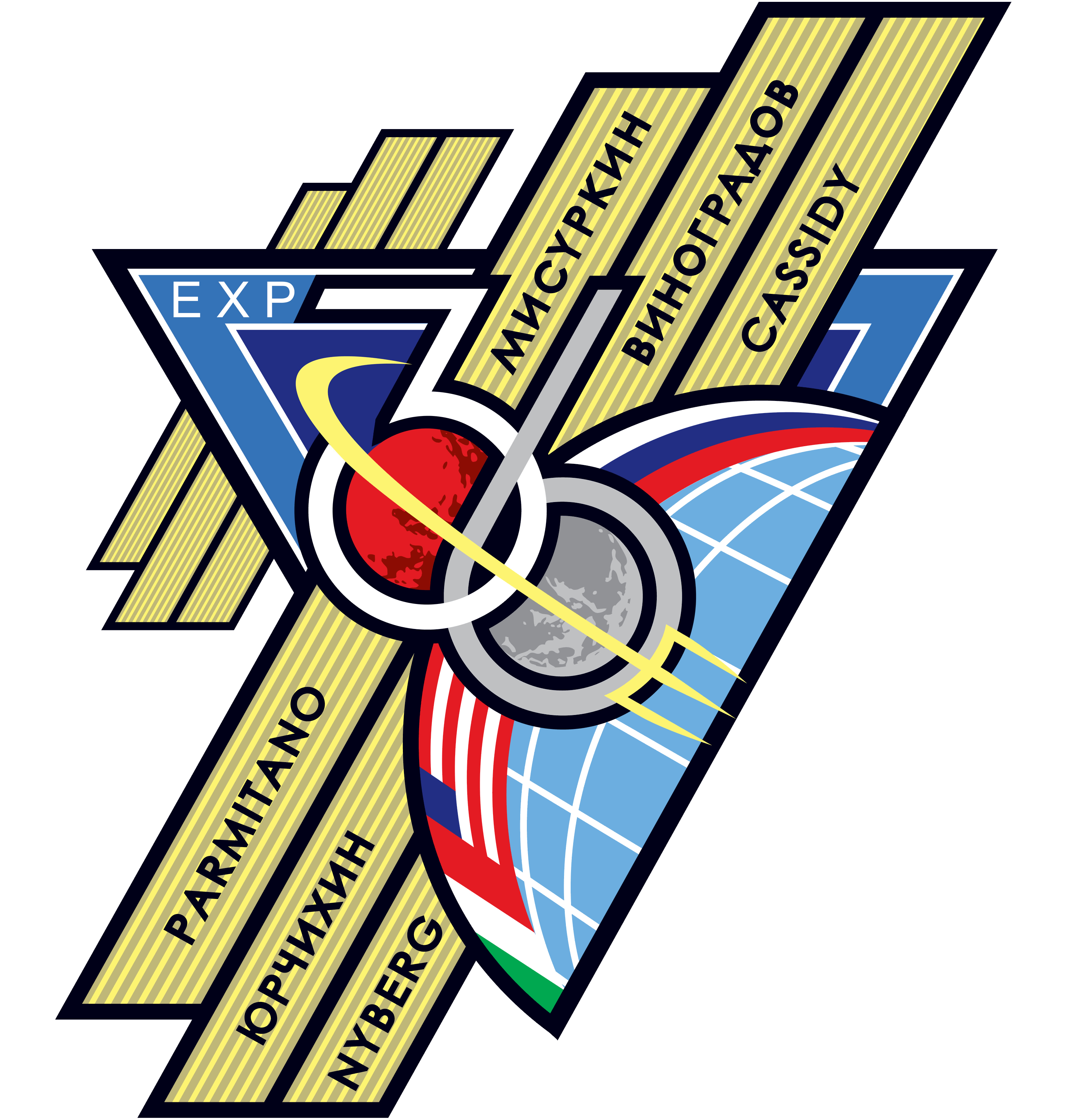
- Mission insignia
- Retired: 2017

Pavel Vladimirovich Vinogradov (Russian: Павел Владимирович Виноградов; born 31 August 1953 in Magadan, USSR) is a former cosmonaut and commander of the International Space Station. He has flown into space three times, aboard Mir and the International Space Station, and was one of the top 10 astronauts in terms of total time in space after his third spaceflight. Vinogradov has also conducted seven spacewalks in his cosmonaut career, and holds the record for the oldest person to perform a spacewalk.

== Personal ==
Vinogradov is married to Irina Valentinovna Vinogradova (née Zakharova); they have one child. His hobbies include game sports, history of aviation and cosmonautics and astronomy.

== Education ==
Vinogradov graduated from Moscow Aviation Institute in 1977.

== Awards ==
Vinogradov was awarded the Hero of the Russian Federation medal.

== Experience ==
From 1977 to 1983 Vinogradov specialized in software development for automated interactive designing systems of recoverable vehicles, development of aerodynamics and aerodyne arrangement design models, computer graphics. In 1983 he started working for the Head Design Bureau of RSC Energia. He worked on flight procedure verification for Soyuz-TM and Buran spacecraft, development of automated crew training systems. He has also participated in launch preparation of the Soyuz-TM, Buran spacecraft and Energia rocket.

== Spaceflight experience ==
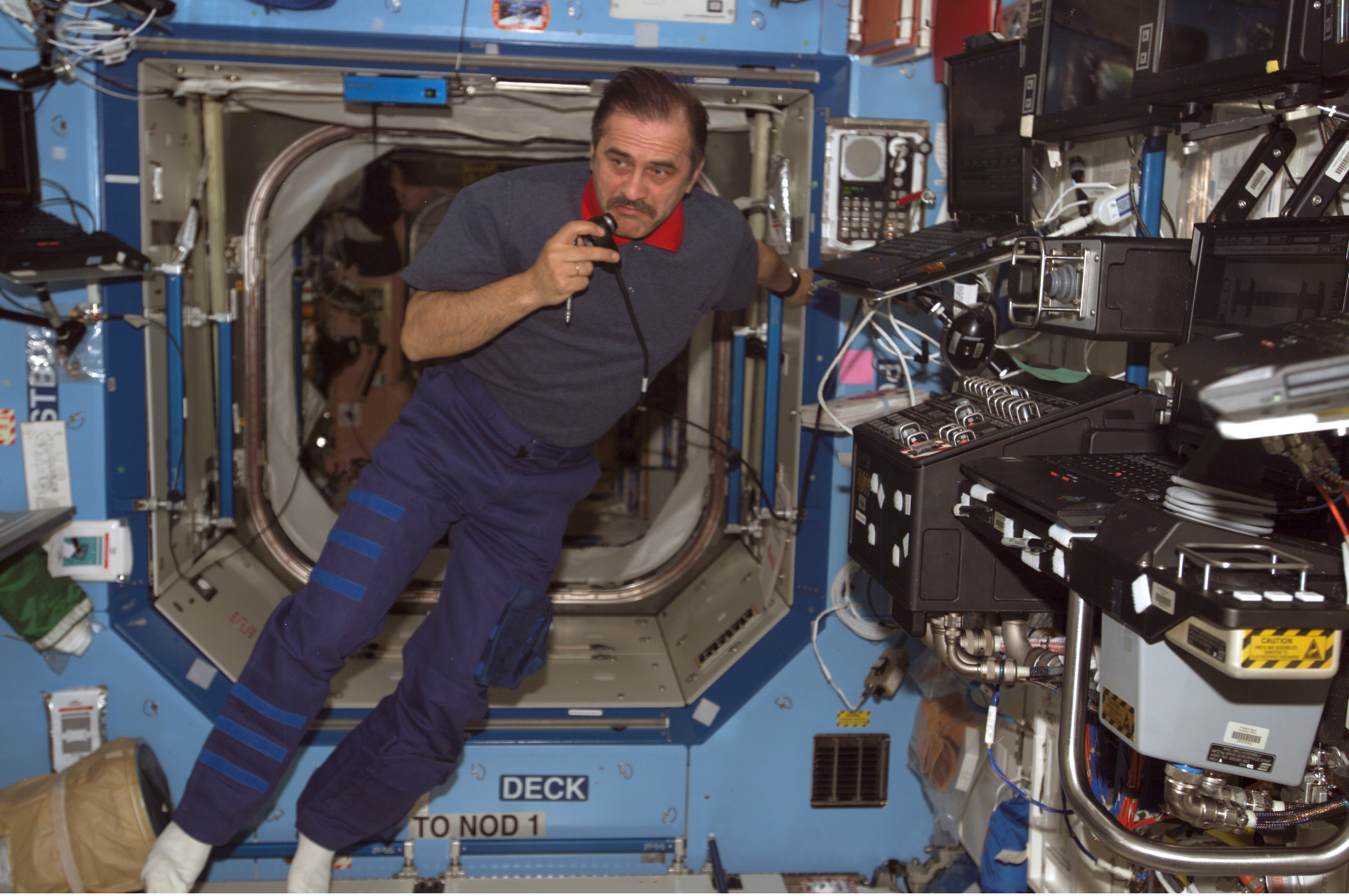
Pavel Vinogradov inside the Destiny lab of the ISS

He was selected for the cosmonaut program on 3 March 1992 and spent the next two years in training. From October 1992 to February 1994, he completed generic space training at GCTC. From May 1994 to February 1995, he completed advanced test-cosmonaut training. Vinogradov was the backup flight engineer for the Soyuz TM-22 flight, launched on 3 September 1995. He was assigned to the Soyuz TM-24 flight, but the entire crew was grounded when the flight commander, Gennadi Manakov, experienced heart problems.

=== Soyuz TM-26 ===
Vinogradov flew as the flight engineer on Soyuz TM-26 on 5 August 1997 with cosmonaut Anatoly Solovyev to the Mir space station. After two days of autonomous flight the Soyuz spacecraft docked with Mir on 7 August. The crew repaired the power cable and harness/connectors in the severely damaged Spektr module and restored much of the lost power. They also repaired and replaced the oxygen generators in Mir. Vinogradov, Solovyev along and ESA astronaut Léopold Eyharts returned to Earth on 19 February 1998. The Soyuz capsule landed 30 km of Arkalyk at 09:10 UTC. During the mission, Vinogradov spent 197 days, 17 hours, and 34 minutes in space.

=== Expedition 13 ===
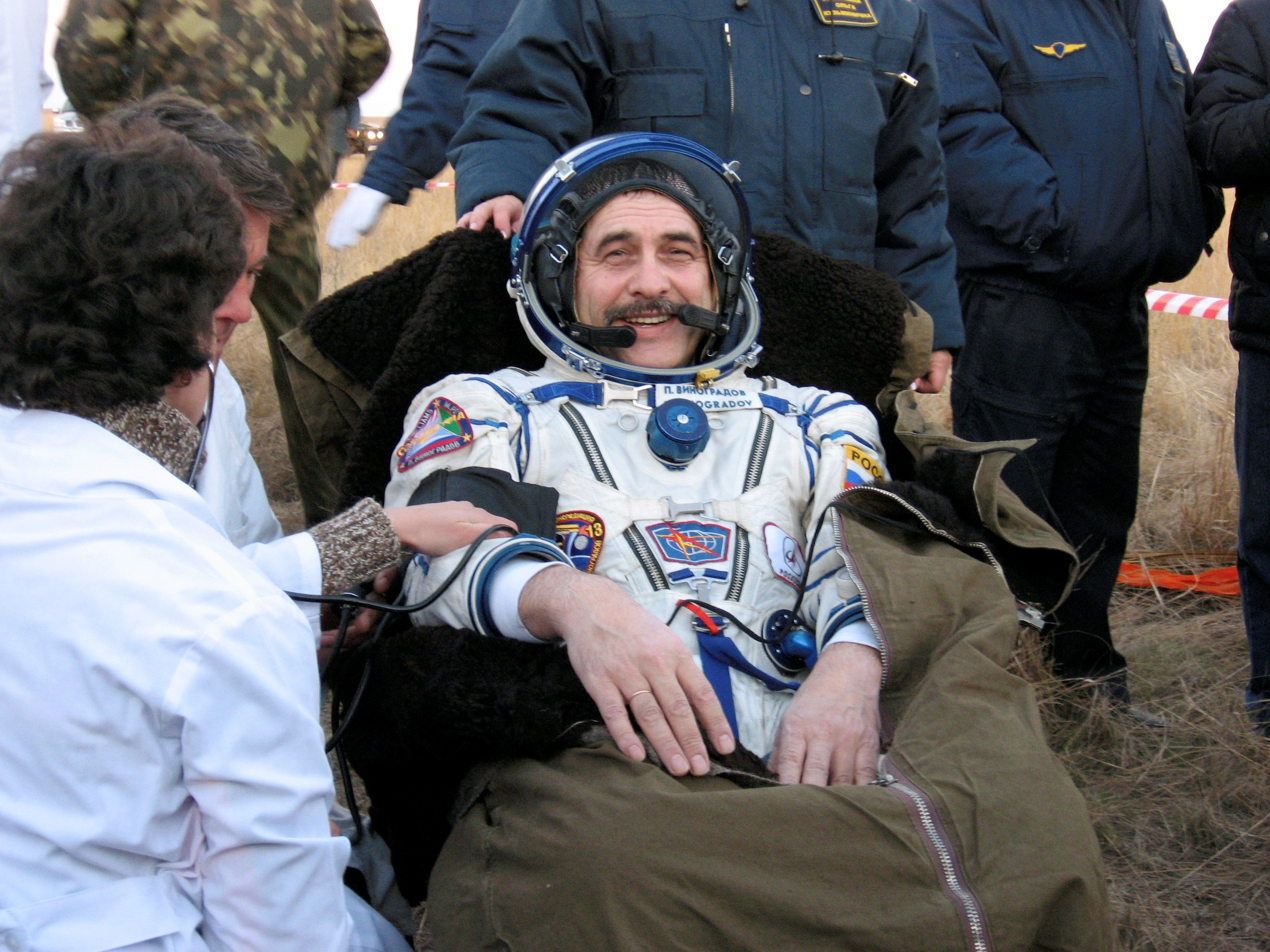
Pavel Vinogradov chats with the recovery team shortly after the landing in the Soyuz TMA-8 spacecraft.

In January 2004, Vinogradov began training as the ISS Expedition 13 crew commander. The mission was launched aboard the Soyuz TMA-8 with Vinogradov and NASA astronaut Jeffrey Williams from the Baikonour Cosmodrome in Kazakhstan on 29 March 2006. Vinogradov served as the Soyuz commander. After two days of solo flight, Soyuz TMA-8 docked with the ISS on 31 March 2006. During their mission, Vinogradov and Williams hosted two NASA shuttle crews during their stay on board the ISS. Space Shuttle Discovery visited the ISS between 6–15 July 2006. The main purposes of STS-121 were to test new safety and repair techniques introduced following the Columbia disaster as well as to deliver supplies, equipment and ESA astronaut Thomas Reiter from Germany to the ISS. Space Shuttle Atlantis brought the P3/P4 truss and its solar wings to the ISS during its STS-115 mission from September 9 to 21. The Soyuz capsule carrying Vinogradov undocked from the ISS at 5:53 p.m. EDT on 28 September 2006, and landed in the steppes of Kazakhstan near Arkalyk at 9:13 p.m. EDT. Vinogradov was joined by NASA astronaut Jeffrey Williams and Spaceflight Participant Anousheh Ansari. Vinogradov spent 182 days, 23 hours and 44 minutes in space on board the Soyuz spacecraft and the ISS.

=== Expeditions 35 and 36 ===
Pavel flew with ISS Expeditions 35 and 36, from March to September 2013. On 12 May 2013 Pavel assumed command of the International Space Station.

=== Spacewalks ===
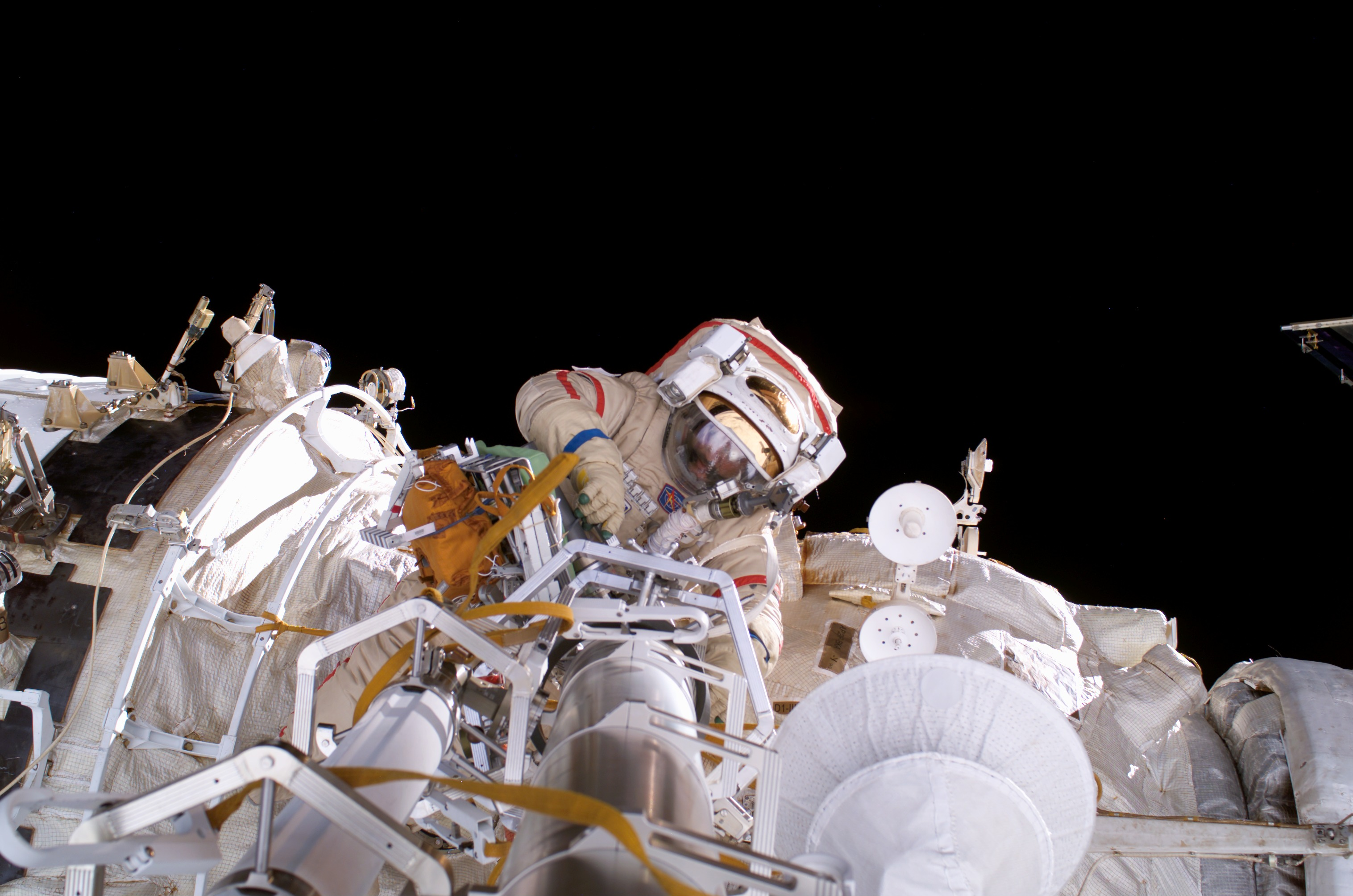
Expedition 13 commander, Vinogradov participates in a spacewalk.

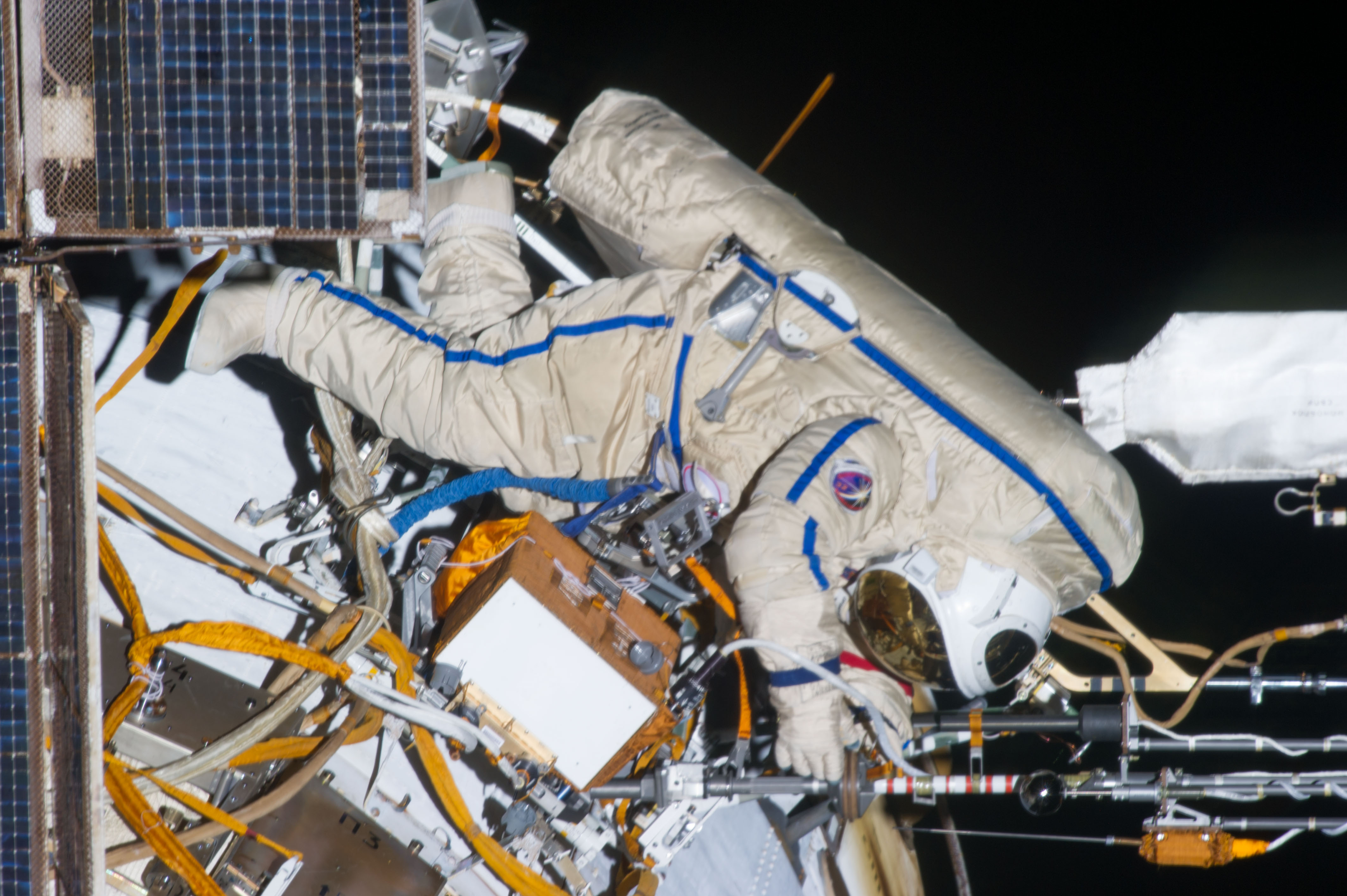
Pavel Vinogradov during the first spacewalk of the Expedition 35 mission on 19 April 2013

Vinogradov has conducted seven spacewalks during his cosmonaut career. Five of these spacewalks were in 1997 and 1998 during his stay on board the Mir space station. His EVA time through seven spacewalks is 38 hours and 25 minutes.

On 22 August 1997 Vinogradov completed his first career spacewalk. He and fellow cosmonaut Anatoly Solovyov began their spacewalk at 11:14 UTC. During the excursion the two spacewalkers, connect power cables, inspected damage on the Spektr module and retrieved equipment. The spacewalk lasted 3 hours and 16 minutes.

On 20 October 1997 Vinogradov conducted his second career spacewalk inside the Spektr module, with Anatoly Solovyov. The duo began their spacewalk at 09:40 UTC. The spacewalk ended at 16:18 UTC. The duration of the spacewalk was 6 hours and 38 minutes.

On 3 November 1997 Vinogradov completed his third career spacewalk, again with Anatoly Solovyov. The two dismantled solar panels and deployed Sputnik 40. The spacewalk began at 03:32 UTC and ended at 09:36 UTC. The excursion lasted 6 hours and 4 minutes.

On 6 November 1997 Vinogradov completed his fourth career spacewalk, again with Anatoly Solovyov. The two spent the entire EVA installing solar panels. The spacewalk began at 00:12 UTC and ended at 06:24 UTC. The excursion lasted 6 hours and 12 minutes.

On 8 January 1998 Vinogradov completed his fifth career spacewalk, again with Anatoly Solovyov. The duo retrieved equipment and repaired leaking EVA hatch. The spacewalk began at 23:08 UTC and ended at 02:14 UTC. The excursion lasted 3 hours and 6 minutes.

On 2 June 2006 Vinogradov performed his sixth career spacewalk. Vinogradov and NASA astronaut Jeffrey Williams spent six hours and 31 minutes making repairs and collecting experiments along the space station's exterior. Their excursion lasted almost an hour longer than planned after the astronauts fell behind in their work schedule. The two spacewalkers began their spacewalk at 22:48 GMT, when they stepped outside the Pirs docking compartment airlock. The spacewalking duo completed two key ISS repairs. Vinogradov replaced a clogged vent nozzle used to dump excess hydrogen overboard by the space station's Elektron oxygen generator. Vinogradov and Williams also replaced a broken video camera that provides key views from the space station's railcar-like Mobile Base System. During the spacewalk, Vinogradov watched a foot restraint adapter, which had previously linked him to the station's Strela crane, drift off into space. The spacewalk ended at 1:19 a.m. EDT when the two spacewalkers re-entered the airlock of the Pirs docking compartment.

Vinogradov was slated to hit a golf ball into space during the spacewalk as part of an agreement between Russia's Federal Space Agency and the Canadian golf equipment firm Element 21 Golf Co. However, it was canceled.

On 19 April 2013 Pavel Vinogradov and Roman Romanenko performed a 6:38 EVA (Russian EVA 32).

== See also ==
- List of Heroes of the Russian Federation

Preceded by William McArthur	ISS Expedition Commander; 1 April to 28 September 2006	Succeeded by Michael López-Alegría
Preceded by Chris Hadfield	ISS Expedition Commander; 13 May to 10 September 2013	Succeeded by Fyodor Yurchikhin
