= Vinograd, Vologda Oblast =

Vinograd Виноград
- Village
- Location within Vologda Oblast Location within Russia
- Coordinates: 59°59′N 44°58′E
- Country: Russia
- Region: Vologda Oblast
- District: Nikolsky District
- Time zone: UTC+3:00

Vinograd (Russian: Виноград) is a rural locality (a village) in Zelentsovskoye Rural Settlement, Nikolsky District, Vologda Oblast, Russia. The population was 53 as of 2002.

== Geography ==
The distance to Nikolsk is 82 km, to Zeletsovo is 12 km. Kachug is the nearest rural locality.
