= Expedition 35 =

Long-duration mission to the International Space Station

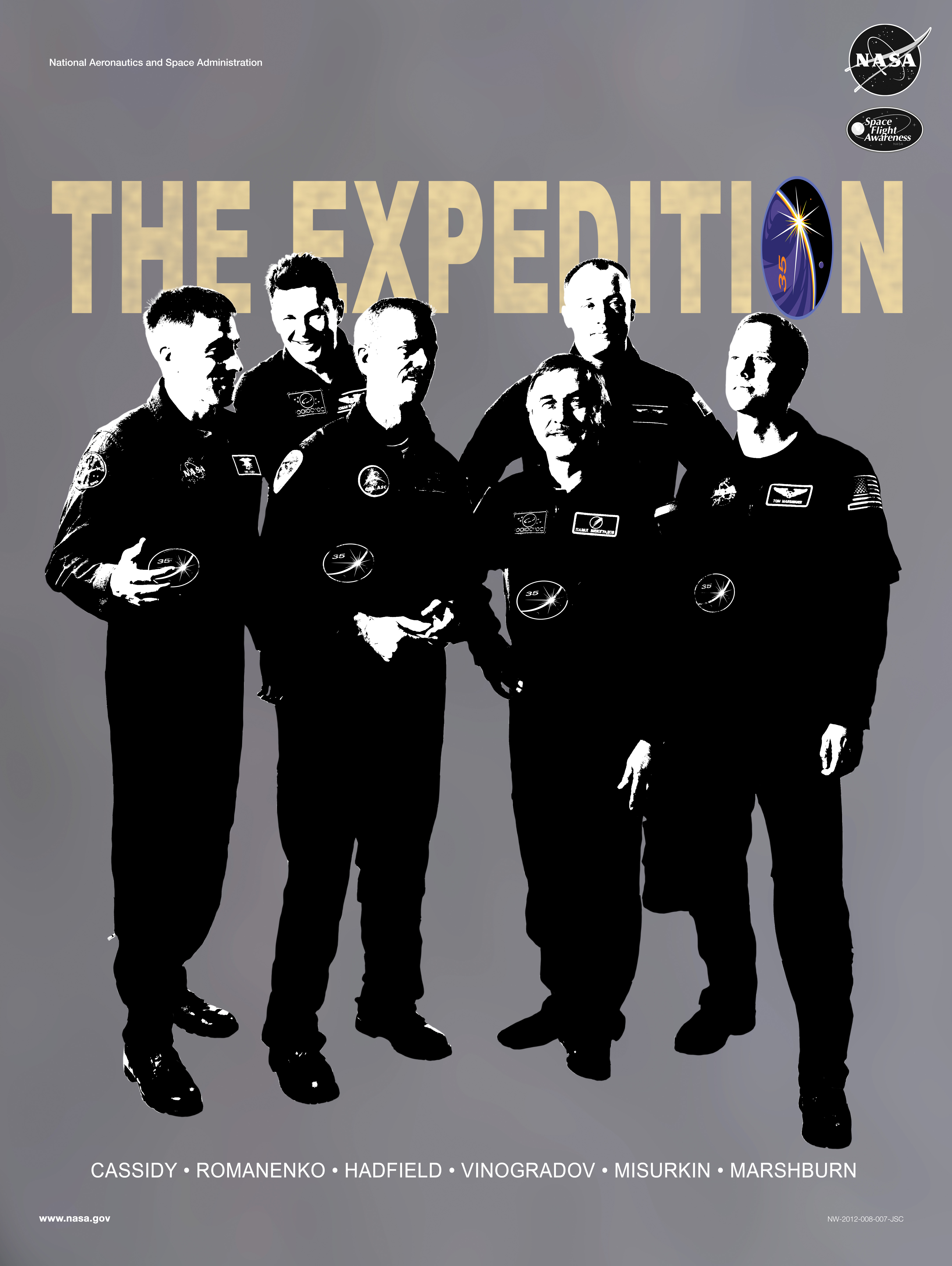
- Promotional Poster
- Mission type: Long-duration expedition

Expedition
- Space station: International Space Station
- Began: 15 March 2013
- Ended: 13 May 2013
- Arrived aboard: Soyuz TMA-07M; Soyuz TMA-08M
- Departed aboard: Soyuz TMA-07M; Soyuz TMA-08M

Crew
- Crew size: 6
- Members: Expedition 34/35: Chris Hadfield; Thomas Marshburn; Roman Romanenko Expedition 35/36: Christopher Cassidy; Pavel Vinogradov; Aleksandr Misurkin
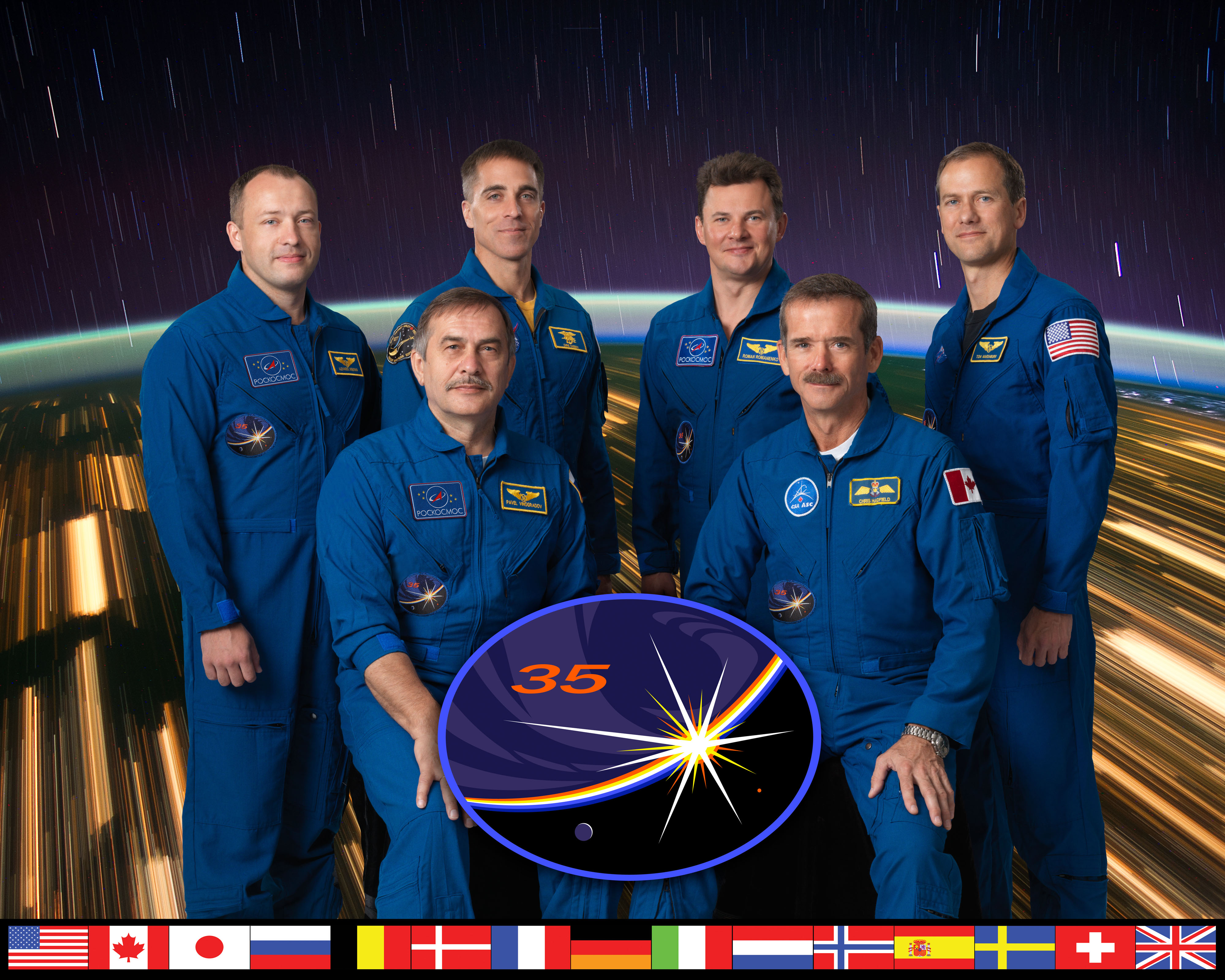
- Expedition 35 mission patch (l-r) Misurkin, Cassidy, Romanenko, Marshburn, Vinogradov and Hadfield ISS expeditions

Expedition 35 was the 35th long-duration mission to the International Space Station (ISS). The expedition started 13 March 2013, and marked the first time a Canadian astronaut—Colonel Chris Hadfield—was in command of the station. Expedition 35 was also only the second time an ISS crew is led by neither a NASA astronaut, nor a Roscosmos cosmonaut, after Expedition 21 in 2009, when ESA astronaut Frank De Winne was in command. The expedition lasted two months.

== Crew ==
Positions	First Part (March 2013)	Second Part (March 2013 to May 2013)
Commander	Chris Hadfield, CSA; Third and last spaceflight	
Flight Engineer 1	Thomas Marshburn, NASA; Second spaceflight	
Flight Engineer 2	Roman Romanenko, RSA; Second and last spaceflight	
Flight Engineer 3		Christopher Cassidy, NASA; Second spaceflight
Flight Engineer 4		Pavel Vinogradov, RSA; Third and last spaceflight
Flight Engineer 5		Aleksandr Misurkin, RSA; First spaceflight

NASA

== Mission highlights ==
The mission generated considerable media attention and turned Commander Chris Hadfield into a minor celebrity. The expedition made extensive use of social media, and several videos uploaded to YouTube have generated millions of hits. In particular, Hadfield was involved in the "first music video recorded in space", a rendition of David Bowie's 1969 song "Space Oddity". Hadfield was also involved in the revealing of the Bank of Canada's new $5 note, part of the Frontier Series of polymer bills released in 2013. The revealing occurred via video on the ISS.

During Expedition 35, the SpaceX CRS-2 mission successfully delivered supplies to the station and returned some cargo from space. This was the second of SpaceX's contracted cargo flights to the ISS and the first to use the unpressurized trunk section.

On 11 May 11, 2013, Christopher Cassidy and Thomas Marshburn performed an unplanned spacewalk to replace a pump controller box suspected to be the source of an ammonia coolant leak.
