= Vynohrad =

Vynohrad (Ukrainian: Виноград) is a name for several places in Ukraine:

- Vynohrad, Vologda Oblast, 2 village of Vologda`s Oblast
- Vynohrad, Otynia settlement hromada, Kolomyia Raion, Ivano-Frankivsk Oblast, a village of Kolomyia Raion (Ivano-Frankivsk Oblast)
- Vynohrad, Horodenka urban hromada, Kolomyia Raion, Ivano-Frankivsk Oblast, a village of Kolomyia Raion (Ivano-Frankivsk Oblast)
- Vynohrad, Chernivtsi Oblast, a village of Vyzhnytsia Raion (Chernivtsi Oblast)

== See also ==
- Vinograd (disambiguation)
