= Oleg Kotov =

Russian physician and cosmonaut (born 1965)

- Олег Котов
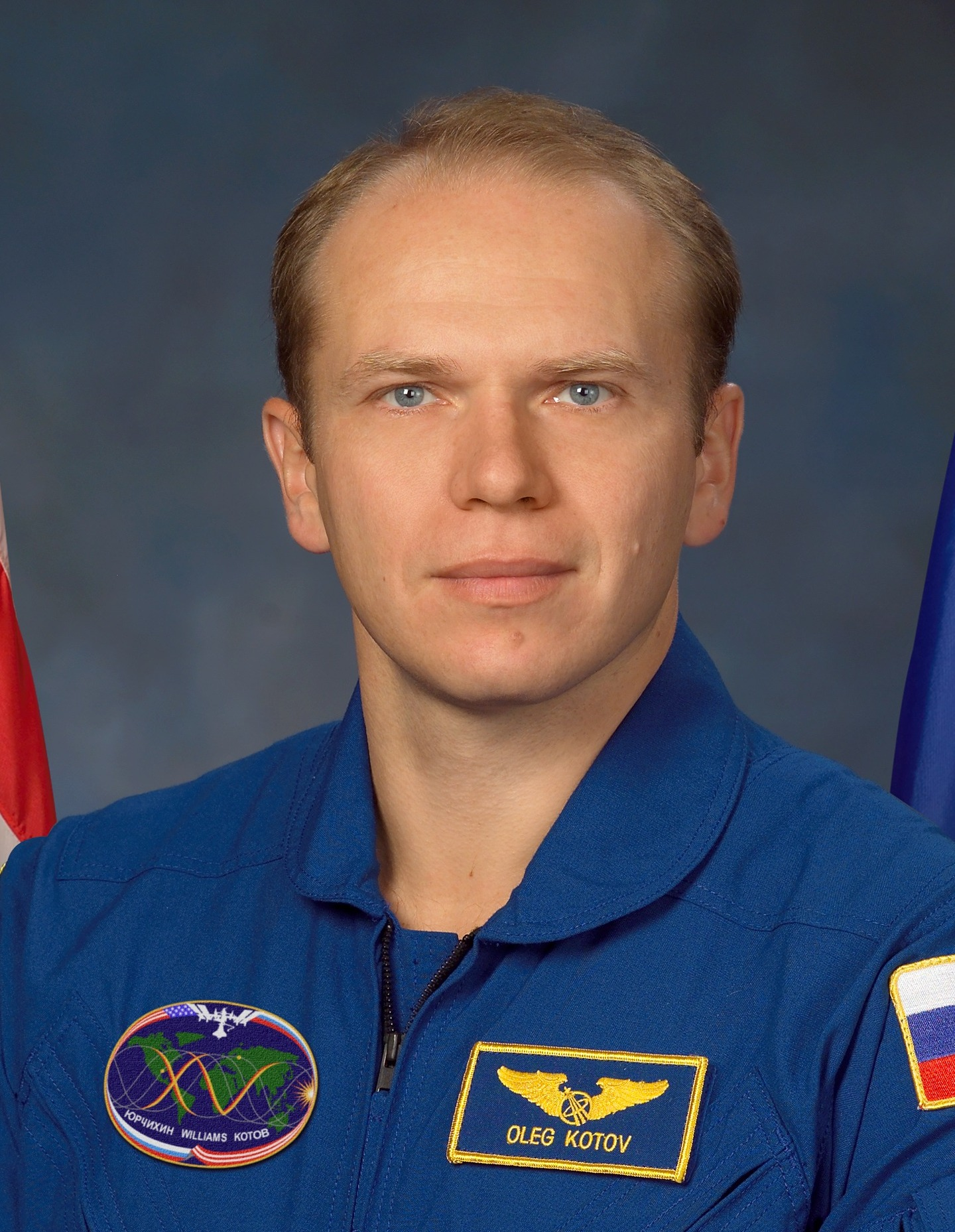
- Kotov in 2006
- Born: 27 October 1965 (age 60); Simferopol, Ukrainian SSR, Soviet Union
- Occupation: Physician
- Awards: Hero of the Russian Federation
- Space career

Roscosmos cosmonaut
- Status: Retired
- Rank: Lieutenant Colonel
- Time in space: 526 days 5 hours 4 minutes
- Selection: 1996 RKA Group
- Total EVAs: 6
- Total EVA time: 36 hours and 51 minutes
- Missions: Soyuz TMA-10 (Expedition 15), Soyuz TMA-17 (Expedition 22/23), Soyuz TMA-10M (Expedition 37/38)
- Mission insignia
- Retired: May 4, 2016

Oleg Valeriyevich Kotov (Russian: Олег Валериевич Котов) was born on 27 October 1965 in Simferopol, Crimean oblast in the Ukrainian SSR. After a career as a physician assigned to the Soviet space program, he joined the Russian cosmonaut corps. He has flown three long duration spaceflights on the International Space Station logging over 526 days in space. Most recently, Kotov flew on the Soyuz TMA-10M/Expedition 37/Expedition 38 long duration spaceflight, from September 2013 until March 2014.

== Personal ==
Kotov is married to Svetlana Nikolayevna Kotova (previously, Bunyakina). They have two children, Valeria Olegovna Kotova (daughter), born in 1994 and Dmitry Olegovich Kotov (son), born in 2002. Kotov's parents, Valeri Efimovich Kotov and Elena Ivanovna Kotova, reside in Moscow. He enjoys diving, computers, and photography.

== Education ==
Kotov finished high school in Moscow in 1982 and entered the S. M. Kirov Military Medical Academy, from which he graduated in 1988.

== Awards ==
Kotov was awarded the Hero of the Russian Federation medal, The Combat Heroism Russian Federation Armed Forces Medal of I and II degrees and the Service Medal of I, II and III degrees.

== Experience ==
After graduation from the Academy in 1988, Kotov served at the Gagarin Cosmonaut Training Center, where he held the positions of Deputy lead test-doctor and Lead test doctor. He dealt with problems of altitude physiology and space flight effects on a human body. He gained experience in practical training and medical support of spacewalks on Mir, and was a crew surgeon and instructor for biomedical training and science program training. He is a certified scuba diver.

== Roscosmos career ==
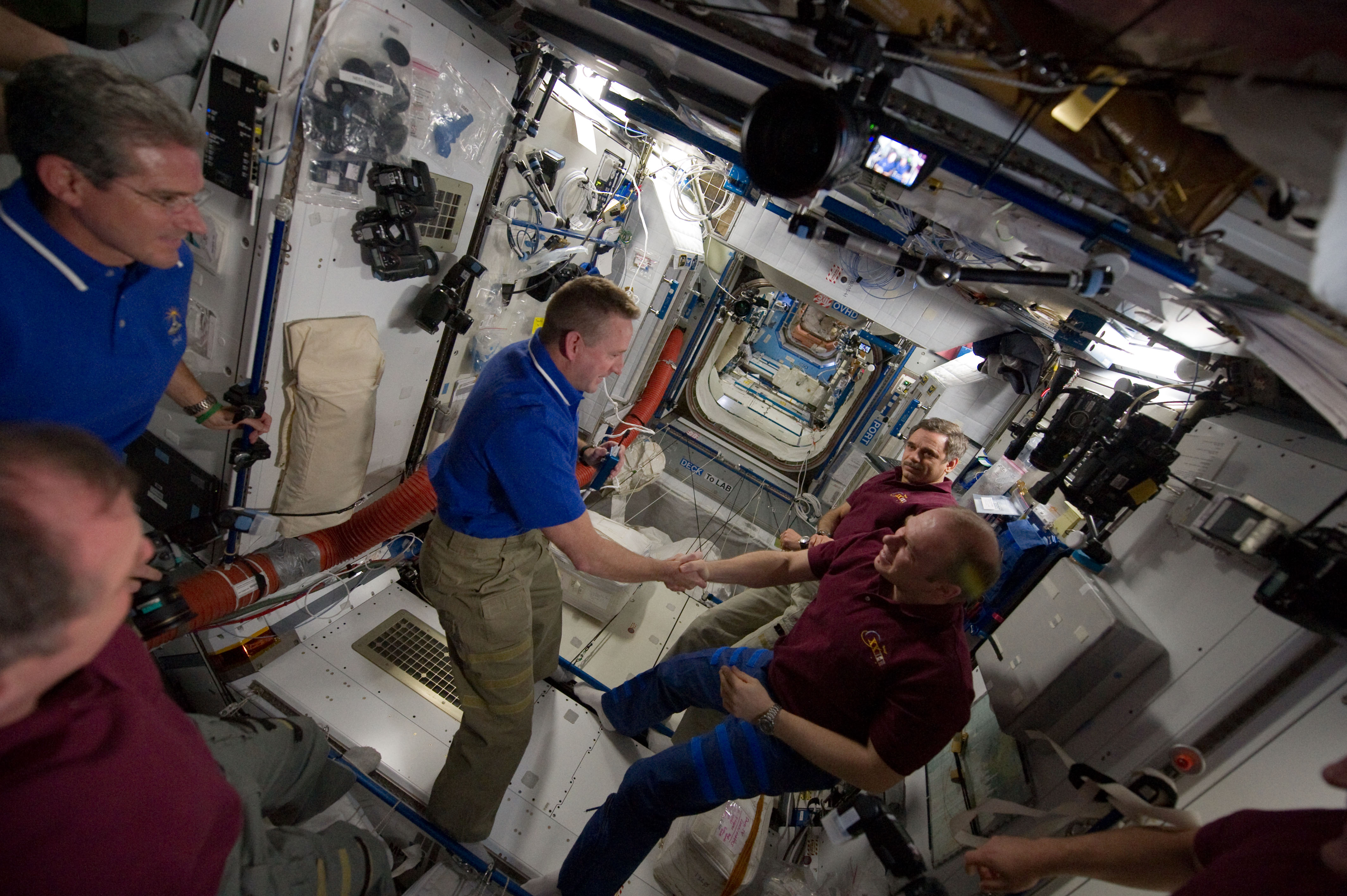
Oleg Kotov and STS-132 commander Kenneth Ham shake hands at the farewell ceremony.

In 1996 Kotov was selected as a cosmonaut candidate by the Gagarin Cosmonaut Training Center (GCTC). From June 1996 to March 1998, he completed a course of basic training for spaceflight. In March 1998, he received a test-cosmonaut qualification. Since July 1998, he has been a cosmonaut-researcher and test-cosmonaut of the Cosmonaut Office. From May–August 1998, he trained for a flight on the Soyuz and the Mir station as a backup crewmember to the Mir-26 mission.

Since October 1998, he participated in advanced training for ISS flights. He served as a flight engineer and Soyuz commander on the ISS-6 and ISS-13 backup crews.

From February–October 1999, Kotov served as a Representative of GCTC at the Johnson Space Center. During 2001–2002 he worked as a CAPCOM for Expedition-3 and 4 in mission control center, Moscow and Moscow Support Group in the Mission Control Center at Houston. In 2004 he became Chief of the CAPCOM Branch in the Cosmonaut Office.

=== Expedition 15 ===
He was a member (Flight Engineer) of the ISS Expedition 15, that launched on 7 April 2007 from Baikonur Cosmodrome, aboard Soyuz TMA-10 spacecraft, together with Fyodor Yurchikhin and space tourist Charles Simonyi.

On October 21, Kotov returned to Earth inside the Soyuz TMA-10 capsule after spending 196 days and 17 hours in space. The TMA-10 spacecraft undocked from the ISS at 07:14 UTC on October 21, and deorbit occurred at 09:47. During atmospheric re-entry, the spacecraft transitioned to a ballistic reentry, resulting in it landing west of Arkalyk, approximately 340 km (210 mi) northwest of the intended Kazakhstan landing site.

=== Expedition 22/23 ===
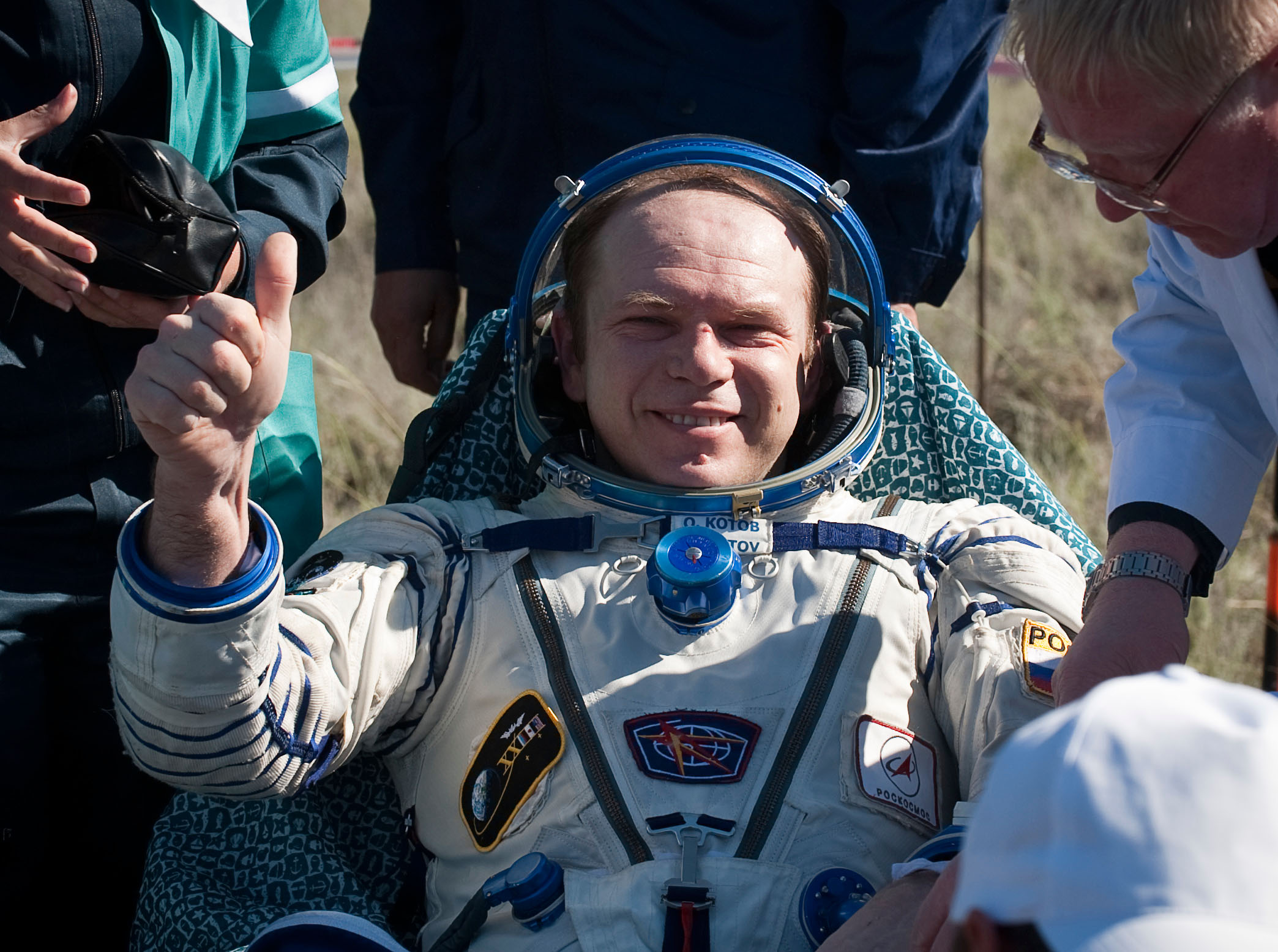
Oleg Kotov sitting in a chair outside the Soyuz TMA-17 spacecraft just minutes after landing.

Kotov commanded Soyuz TMA-17 and was assigned to Expedition 22 as a Flight Engineer and Expedition 23 as the Commander aboard the International Space Station.

On 1 May 2010 Kotov manually flew the final 1 km of the incoming Progress M-05M spacecraft to the ISS after it failed to return to the proper docking orientation following a series of thruster firings. Kotov using the station's Telerobotically Operated Rendezvous Unit (TORU) system took control and guided the spacecraft to successfully dock with the ISS. Later Russian Mission Control announced that Kotov's Progress M-05M rendezvous work may have set a new record.

Kotov returned to Earth on 2 June 2010 aboard the Soyuz TMA-17 spacecraft. The Soyuz capsule touched down at about 3:25 UTC on the central steppes of Kazakhstan.

=== Expedition 37/38 ===
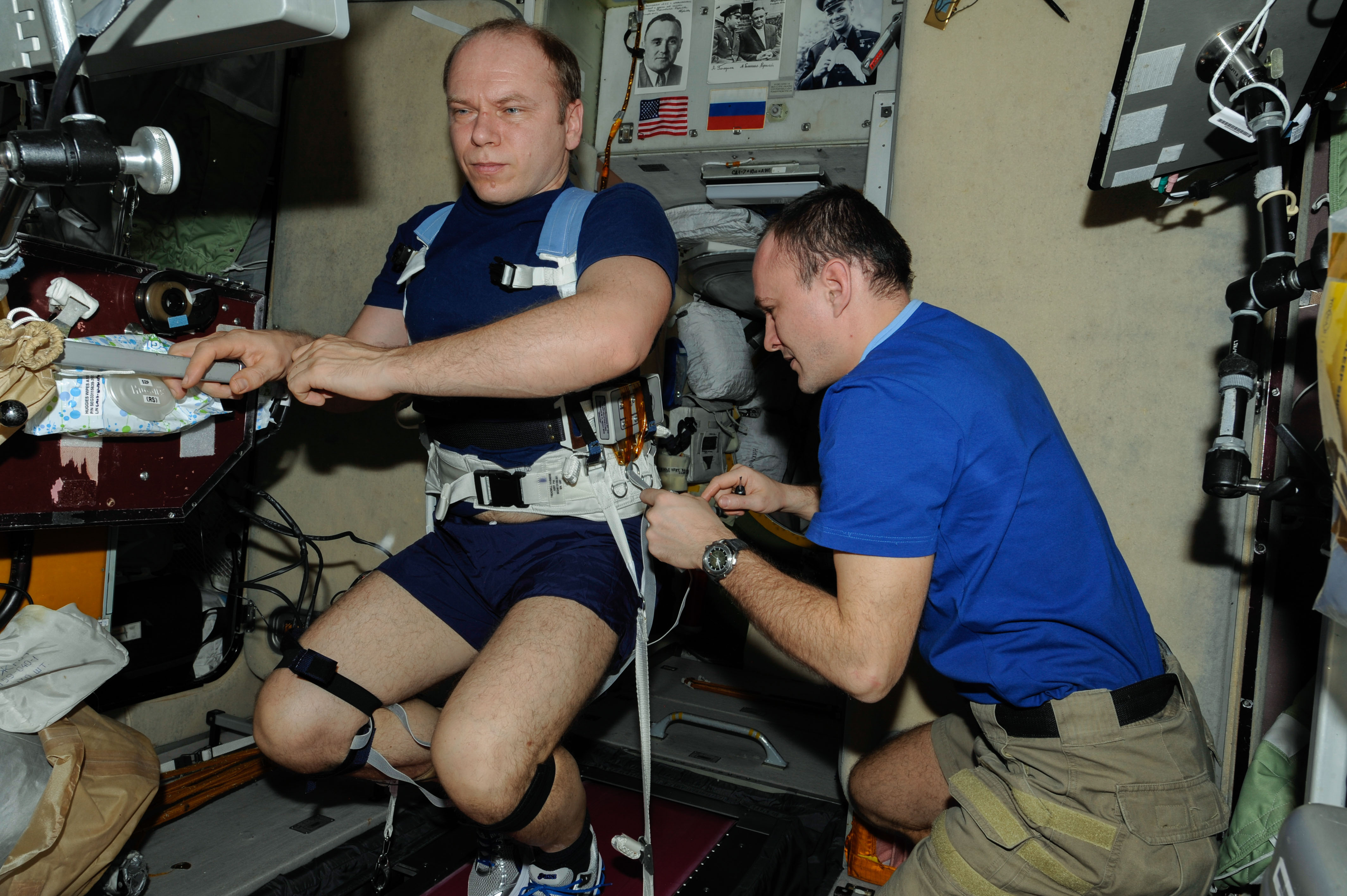
Oleg Kotov on Expedition 38 performs the Motocard experiment in the Zvezda Service Module.

Kotov launched on Soyuz TMA-10M on 25 September 2013, with Russian cosmonaut Sergey Ryazansky and American astronaut Michael Hopkins joined Expedition 37 as a Flight Engineer. On 7 November Kotov and rest of the five Expedition 37 crew members were joined by new Expedition 38 flight engineers, Mikhail Tyurin, Koichi Wakata and Rick Mastracchio. This was first time since October 2009 that nine people resided on the space station without the presence of a space shuttle. Soon after Kotov became the station commander for the second time since Expedition 23 in 2010.

Kotov and cosmonaut Ryazansky made history after they took an Olympic torch for a spacewalk for the first time ever on 9 November 2013. Kotov returned to Earth on 11 March 2014 after staying at the ISS for 166 days.

=== Spacewalks ===
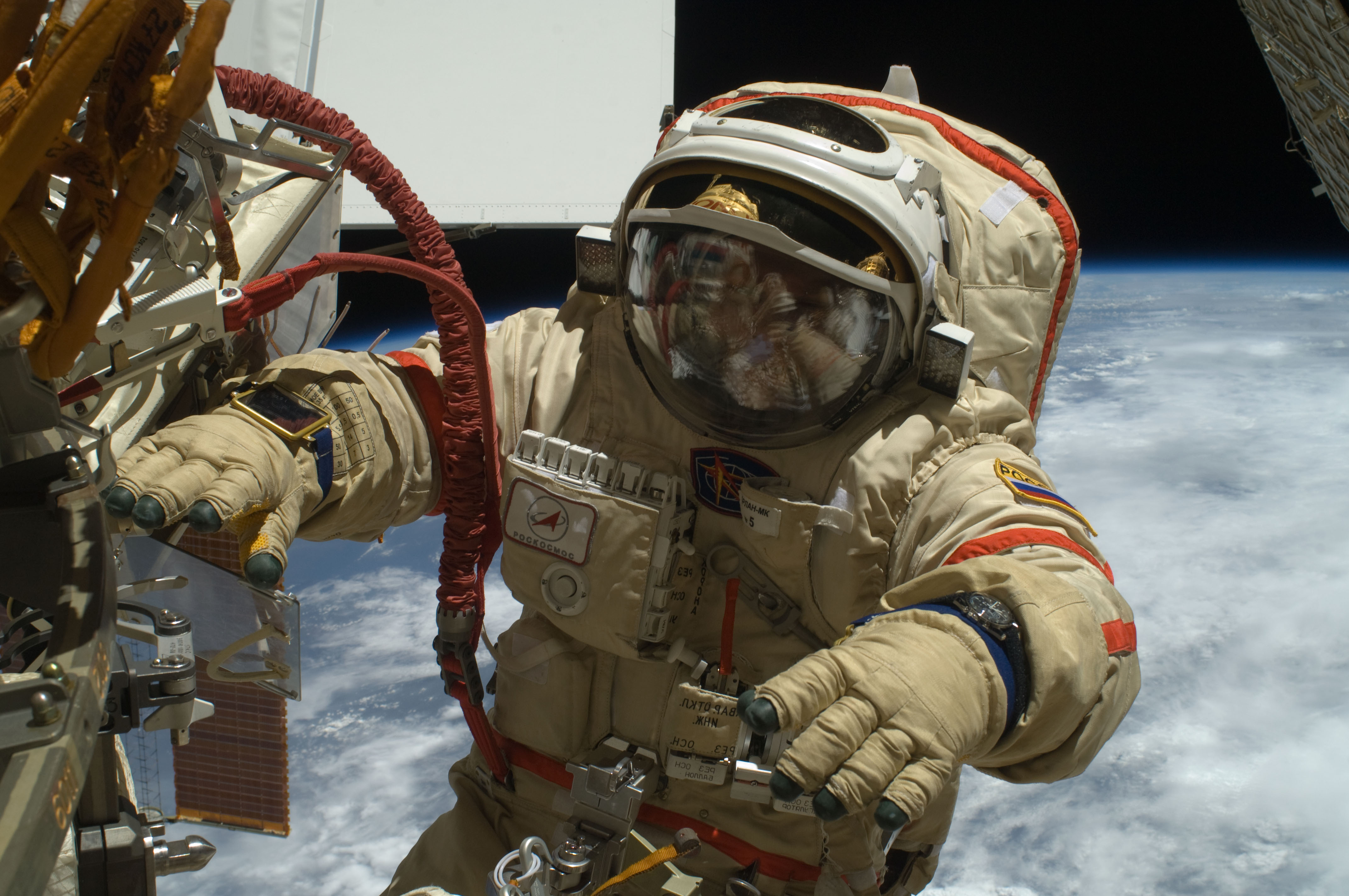
Oleg Kotov participates in a spacewalk on 14 January 2010

On 30 May 2007 at 19:05 GMT, accompanied by Fyodor Yurchikhin, Kotov began his first spacewalk, lasting 5 hours and 25 minutes, during which they installed protective panels to shield the ISS from space debris.

On 6 June 2007 Kotov performed his second spacewalk from the Pirs docking compartment airlock. Along with Yurchikhin, Kotov installed a section of Ethernet cable on the Zarya module, installed additional Service Module Debris Protection (SMDP) panels on Zvezda, and deployed a Russian scientific experiment. The two cosmonauts returned to the ISS at 4:00 p.m. EDT to wound up the 5 hours, 37 minutes spacewalk.

On 14 January 2010 Kotov again ventured outside the ISS with fellow Russian cosmonaut Maksim Surayev to begin his third spacewalk. The spacewalking duo connected cables between the Poisk and Zvezda modules, installed docking targets and Kurs aerials and attached additional handrails to exit hatches. The spacewalk lasted 5 hours and 44 minutes.

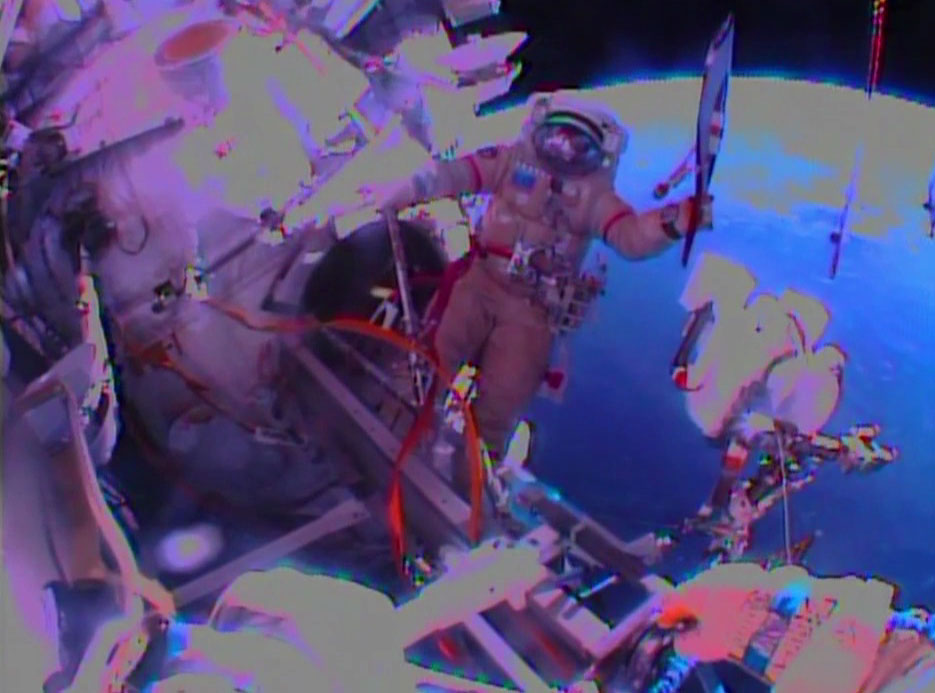
Oleg Kotov waves the Olympic torch outside the International Space Station during his fourth career spacewalk.

On 9 November 2013, Kotov performed his fourth spacewalk outside the ISS with Sergey Ryazansky. They took the Olympic torch for the 2014 Winter Olympic Games outside ISS. They also continued work on an extravehicular activity workstation and biaxial pointing platform by removing launch brackets and bolts, as well as retrieving an experimental package. The planned installation of a foot restraint on the mounting seat of the workstation was deferred to a future spacewalk after the spacewalkers noticed some issues with its alignment. The spacewalk lasted 5 hours 50 minutes.

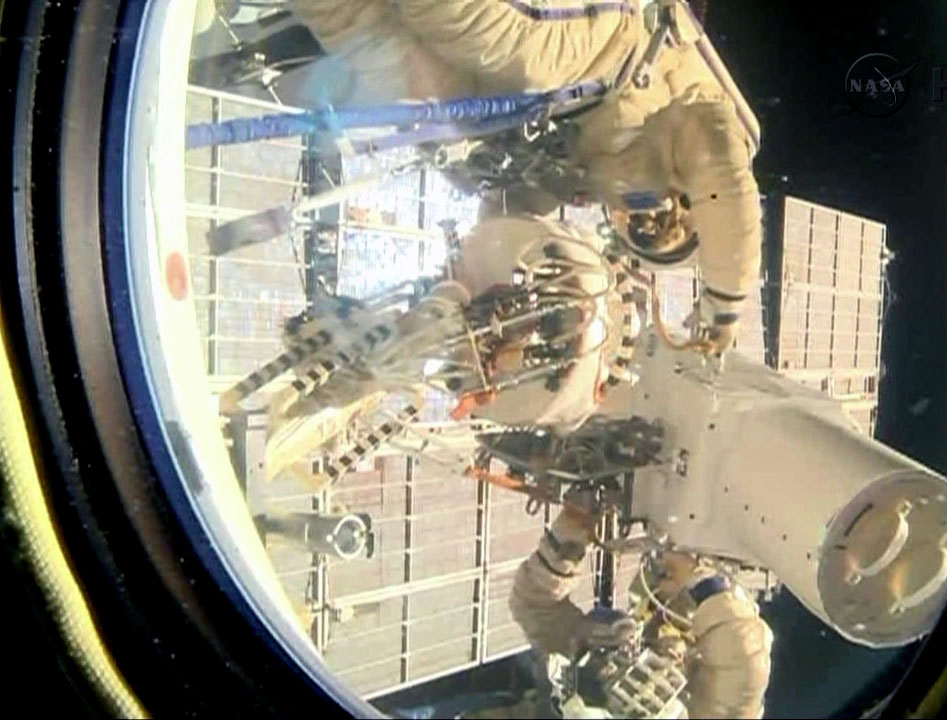
Kotov and Ryazansky remove the high resolution camera they installed earlier during the spacewalk on 27 December 2013.

On 27 December 2013, Kotov and Ryazansky were outside of the ISS to perform a spacewalk. The cosmonauts attached two (high and medium resolution) cameras as part of a commercial agreement between a Canadian firm and the Russian Federal Space Agency to provide Earth views to internet-based subscribers. Kotov routed the data and telemetry cables for the medium resolution camera, however, flight control team at the Russian Mission Control Center did not see the expected telemetry and electrical connectivity from the cameras. Eventually, the cosmonauts were instructed to remove the cameras and return them back inside the ISS for further analysis. In addition to the camera installation work, Kotov and Ryazansky also removed and jettisoned the Vsplesk experiment package designed to monitor seismic effects using high-energy particle streams in the near-Earth environment. The spacewalkers next attached the more sophisticated earthquake-monitoring Seismoprognoz experiment to a Zvezda handrail. The spacewalk lasted 8 hours and 7 minutes and extended the record for the longest Russian spacewalk set by Expedition 36 cosmonauts Fyodor Yurchikhin and Alexander Misurkin, who conducted a 7-hour, 29 minute spacewalk on 16 August 2013.

On 27 January 2014, Kotov did perform his sixth spacewalk outside the ISS with cosmonaut Ryazansky. The cosmonauts completed work that could not be finished up during their last spacewalk on December 27. After exiting the Pirs docking compartment, the two cosmonauts arrived at the outside of the Zvezda service module. They then installed a high resolution camera and a medium resolution camera to capture Earth imagery, however the medium resolution camera again experienced telemetry issues. Kotov and Ryazansky also removed a cassette container attached to the Pirs docking compartment, installed earlier as part of a materials exposure experiment. They also removed a worksite interface adapter attached to a portable data grapple fixture on the Zarya module to ensure that future operations with the Canadarm2 robotic arm will not be disrupted. The spacewalk marked the fourth EVA conducted during the Expedition 38 and lasted six hours and eight minutes.

Preceded by Jeffrey N. Williams	ISS Expedition Commander; 17 March to 2 June 2010	Succeeded by Aleksandr Skvortsov
Preceded by Fyodor Yurchikhin	ISS Expedition Commander; 10 November 2013 to 10 March 2014	Succeeded by Koichi Wakata
