= Expedition 37 =

Long-duration mission to the International Space Station

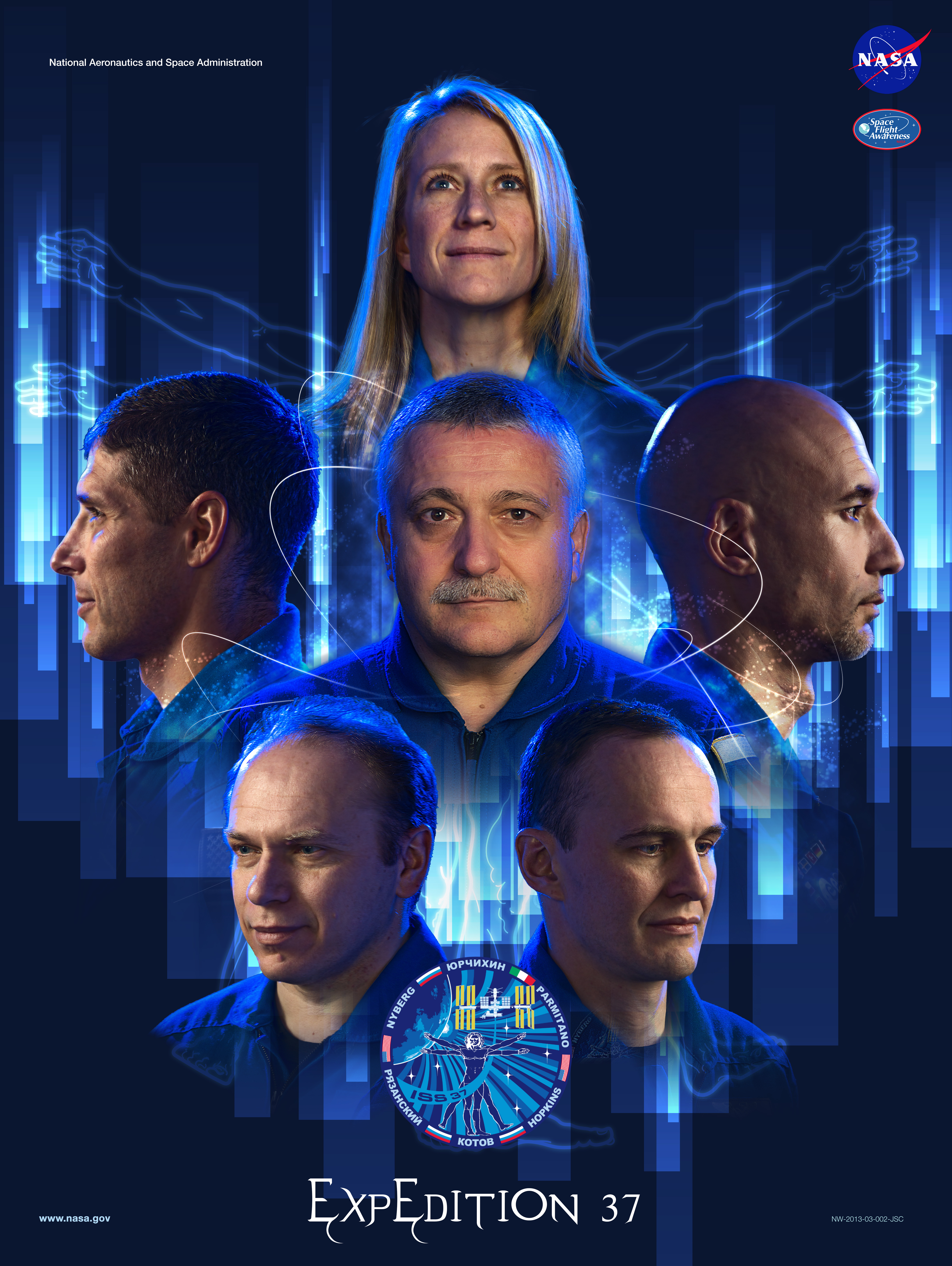
- Promotional Poster
- Mission type: Long-duration expedition

Expedition
- Space station: International Space Station
- Began: 10 September 2013
- Ended: 10 November 2013
- Arrived aboard: Soyuz TMA-09M; Soyuz TMA-10M
- Departed aboard: Soyuz TMA-09M; Soyuz TMA-10M

Crew
- Crew size: 6
- Members: Expedition 36/37: Fyodor Yurchikhin; Karen L. Nyberg; Luca Parmitano Expedition 37/38: Oleg Kotov; Sergey Ryazansky; Michael S. Hopkins
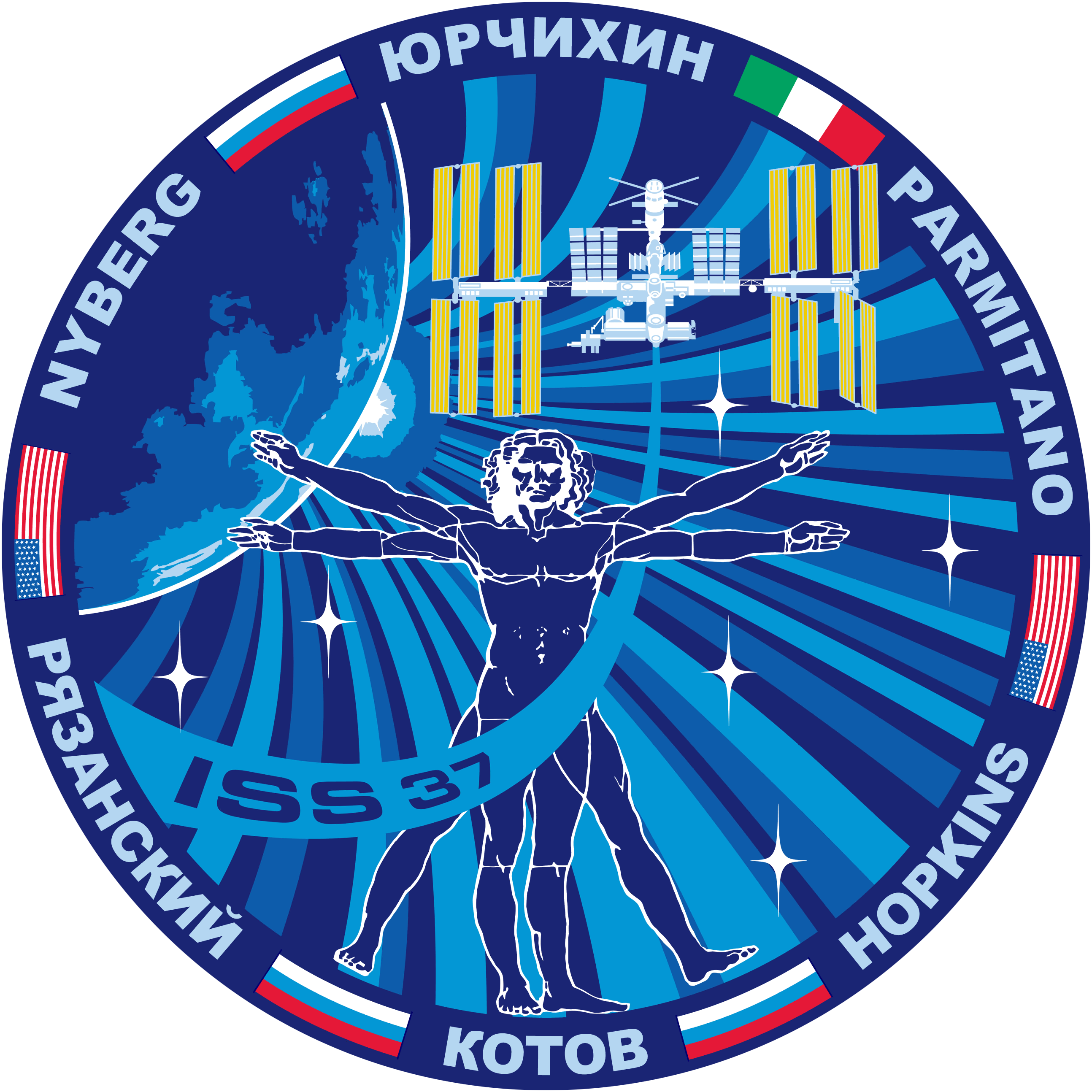
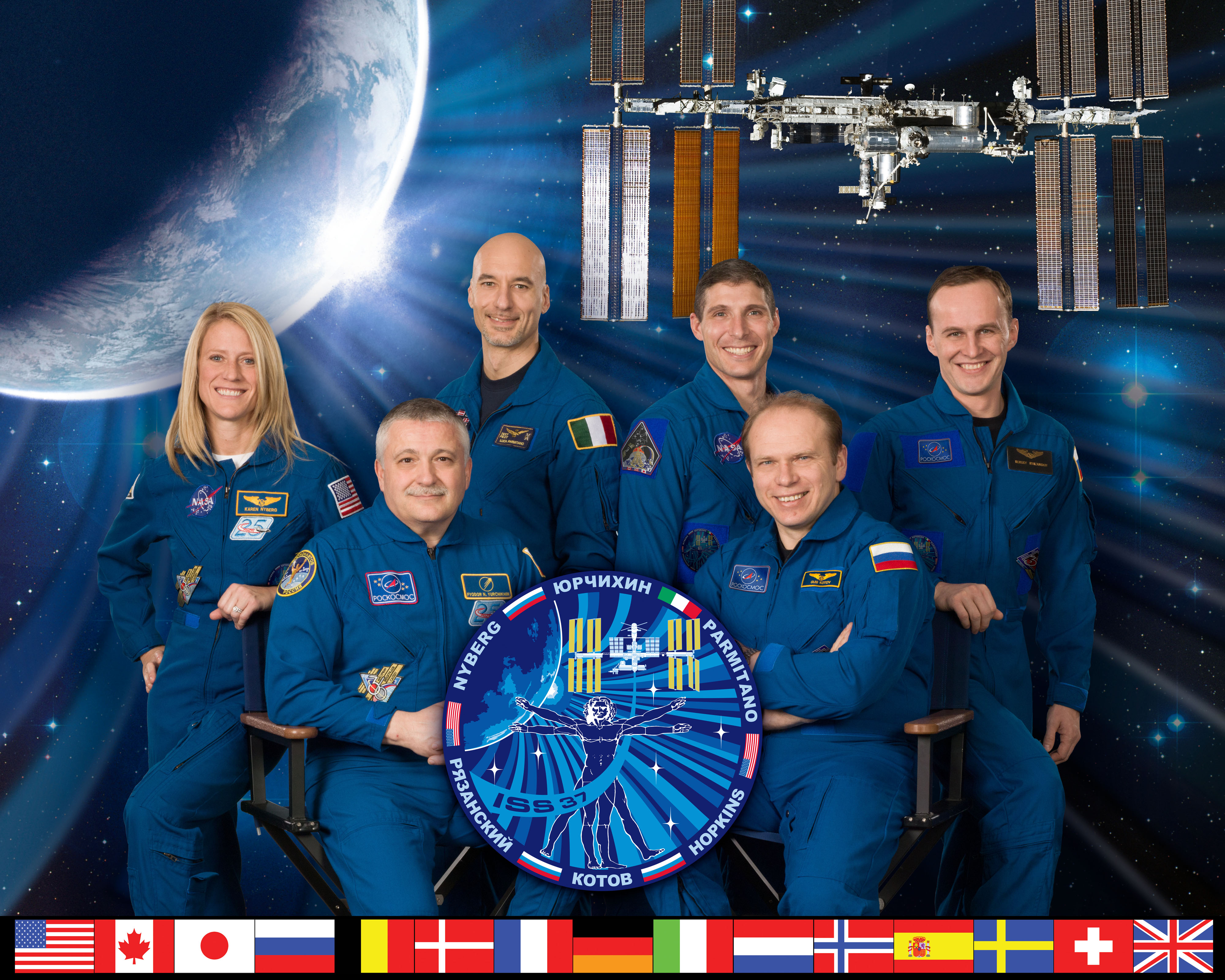
- Expedition 37 mission patch (l-r) Nyberg, Yurchikhin, Parmitano, Hopkins, Kotov and Ryazansky ISS expeditions

Expedition 37 was the 37th expedition to the International Space Station.

== Crew ==
Position	First Part (September 2013)	Second Part (September 2013 to November 2013)
Commander	Fyodor Yurchikhin, RSA; Fourth spaceflight	
Flight Engineer 1	Karen L. Nyberg, NASA; Second and last spaceflight	
Flight Engineer 2	Luca Parmitano, ESA; First spaceflight	
Flight Engineer 3		Oleg Kotov, RSA; Third and last spaceflight
Flight Engineer 4		Sergey Ryazansky, RSA; First spaceflight
Flight Engineer 5		Michael S. Hopkins, NASA; First spaceflight

NASA, ESA
