= Doug Hurley =

American astronaut (born 1966)

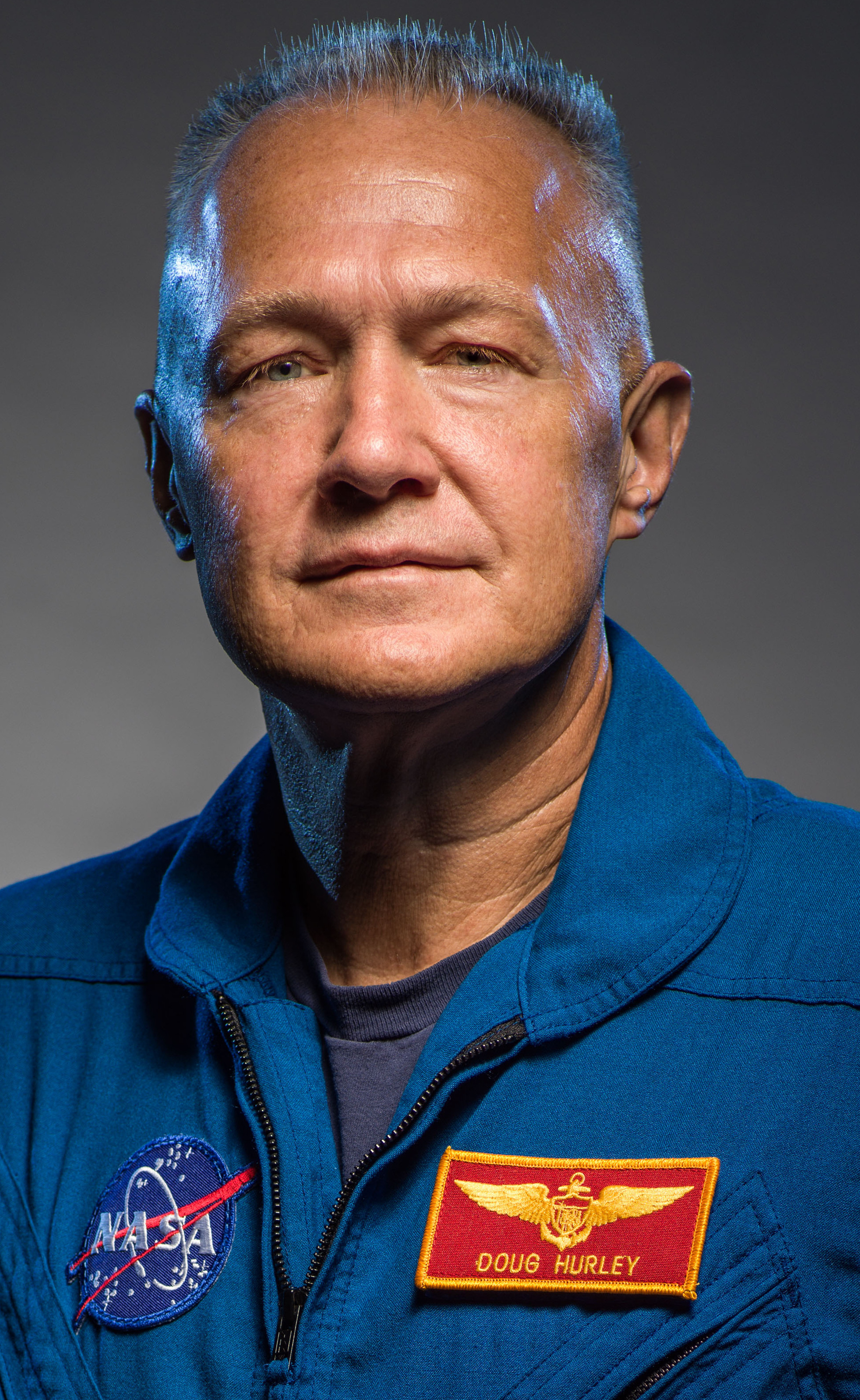
- Hurley in July 2018
- Born: Douglas Gerald Hurley; October 21, 1966 (age 60); Endicott, New York, U.S.
- Education: Tulane University (BS)
- Spouse: Karen Nyberg
- Children: 1
- Space career

NASA astronaut
- Rank: Colonel, USMC
- Time in space: 92d 10h 38m
- Selection: NASA Group 18 (2000)
- Mission: STS-127; STS-135; SpX-DM2 (Expedition 63)
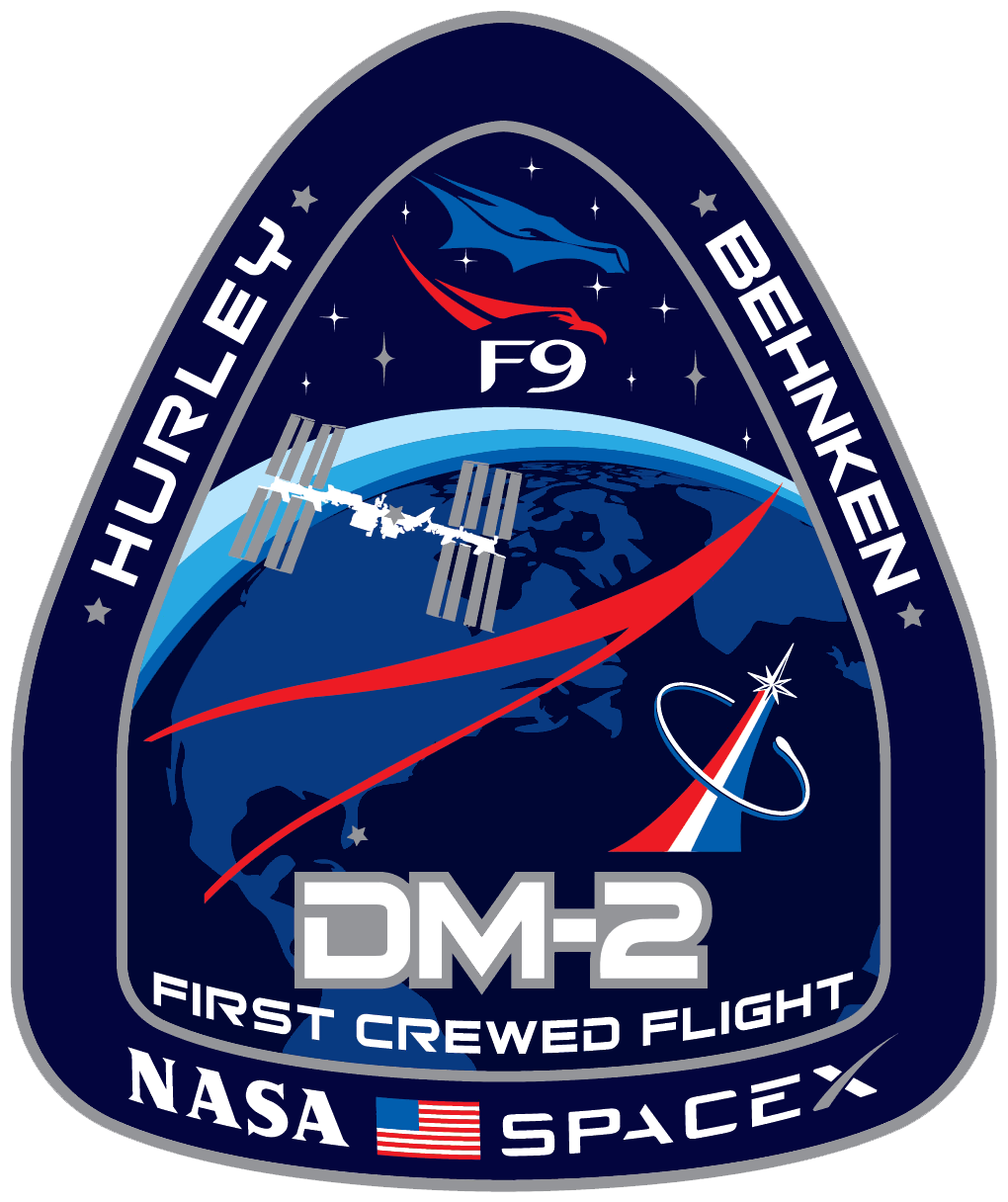
- Mission insignia
- Retired: July 16, 2021
- Website: Official website

Douglas Gerald Hurley (born October 21, 1966) is an American engineer, former Marine Corps pilot, and former NASA astronaut. He piloted Space Shuttle missions STS-127 (July 2009) and STS-135 (July 2011), the final flight of the Space Shuttle program. He launched into space for the third time as commander of Crew Dragon Demo-2, the first crewed spaceflight from American soil since STS-135 and became, together with Bob Behnken, the first astronaut in history launching aboard a commercial orbital spacecraft. He was also the first Marine to fly the F/A-18 E/F Super Hornet. His call sign is "Chunky", and he was sometimes referred to by this name on the communication loops.

== Early years and education ==
Hurley was born on October 21, 1966, in Endicott, New York, and spent his childhood in Apalachin, New York. He graduated from the Owego Free Academy in Owego, New York in 1984 and graduated magna cum laude with honors from Tulane University, earning his Bachelor of Science degree in civil engineering in 1988. He was also a distinguished graduate from both Tulane's Naval Reserve Officer Training Corps (NROTC) program and from USMC Officer Candidates School.

== Marine Corps career ==
Hurley received his commission as a second lieutenant in the United States Marine Corps from the Naval Reserve Officer Training Corps at Tulane University, New Orleans, Louisiana, in 1988. After graduation, he attended The Basic School at Marine Corps Base Quantico, Virginia, and later the Infantry Officers Course. Following aviation indoctrination at Naval Air Station Pensacola, Florida, he entered flight training in Texas in 1989; he was a distinguished graduate of the U.S. Navy Pilot Training program and was designated a Naval Aviator in August 1991.

Hurley then reported to VMFAT-101 at Marine Corps Air Station El Toro, California for initial F/A-18 Hornet training. Upon completion of training, he was assigned to VMFA(AW)-225 where he made three overseas deployments to the Western Pacific. While assigned to VMFA(AW)-225, he attended the United States Marine Aviation Weapons and Tactics Instructor Course, the Marine Division Tactics Course and the Aviation Safety Officers Course at the Naval Postgraduate School in Monterey, California. Over his four-and-a-half years with the "Vikings", he served as the aviation safety officer and the pilot training officer.

Hurley was then selected to attend the United States Naval Test Pilot School at Naval Air Station Patuxent River, Maryland and began the course in January 1997. After graduation in December 1997, he was assigned to the Naval Strike Aircraft Test Squadron (VX-23) as an F/A-18 project officer and test pilot. At "Strike", he participated in a variety of flight testing, including flying qualities, ordnance separation and systems testing and became the first Marine pilot to fly the F/A-18 E/F Super Hornet. He was serving as the operations officer when selected for the astronaut program. Hurley has logged over 5,500 hours in more than 25 types of aircraft.

== NASA career ==
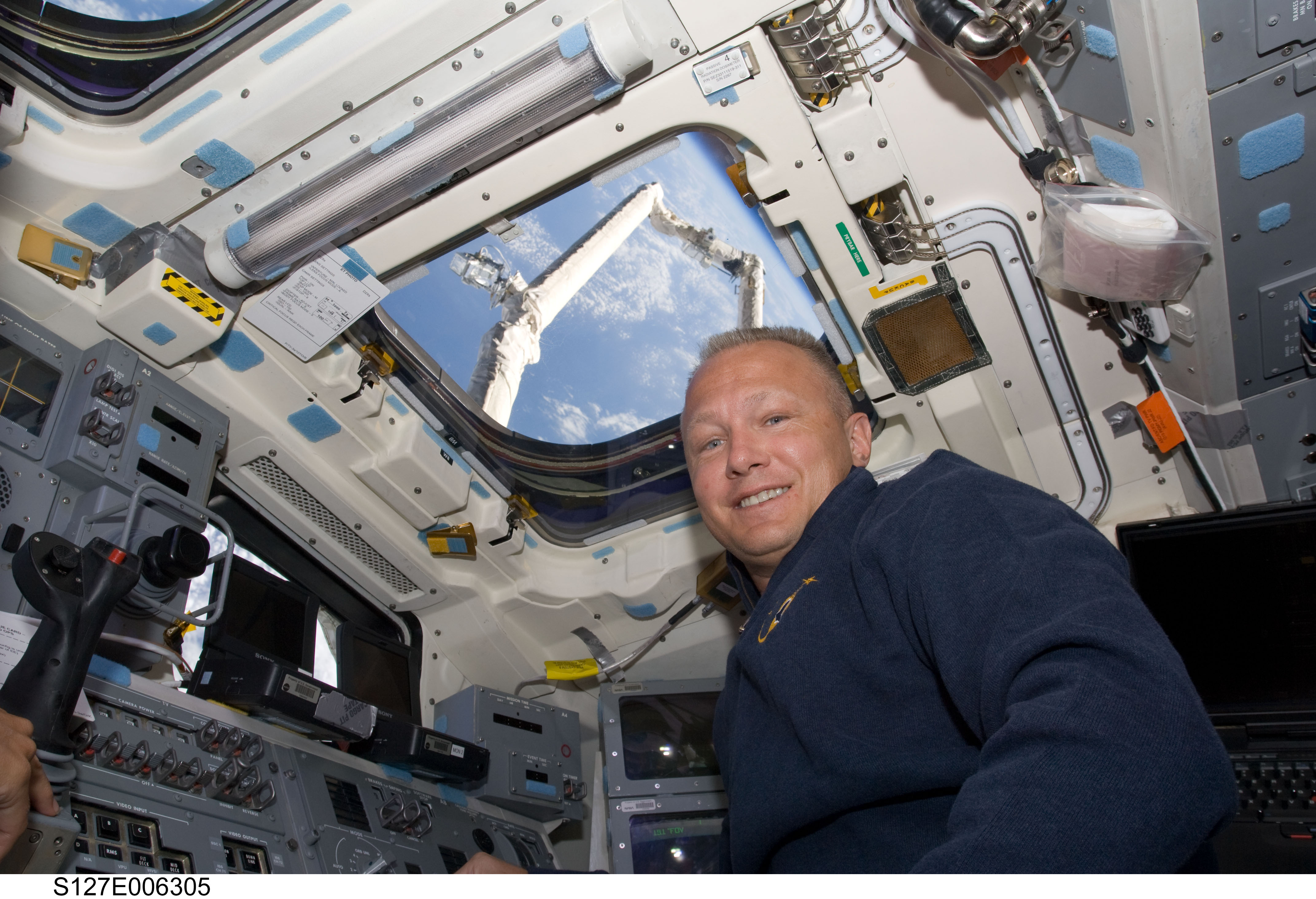
Hurley during the STS-127 mission in July 2009

Selected as a pilot by NASA in July 2000, Hurley reported for training in August 2000. Following the completion of two years of training and evaluation, he was assigned technical duties in the Astronaut Office which included Kennedy Operations Support as a "Cape Crusader," where he was the lead ASP (Astronaut Support Personnel) for Space Shuttle missions STS-107 and STS-121. He also worked shuttle landing and rollout, served on the Columbia Reconstruction Team at Kennedy Space Center and in the Exploration Branch in support of the selection of the Orion crew exploration vehicle.

He also served as the NASA Director of Operations at the Gagarin Cosmonaut Training Center in Star City, Russia.

=== STS-127 ===
In 2009, he was the pilot on STS-127, ISS Assembly Mission 2J/A, which delivered the Japanese-built Exposed Facility (JEM-EF) and the Experiment Logistics Module Exposed Section (ELM-ES) to the International Space Station (ISS). This mission launched on July 15 and landed back at Kennedy SLF Runway 15 on July 31. The mission duration was 15 days, 16 hours, 45 minutes.

=== STS-135 ===
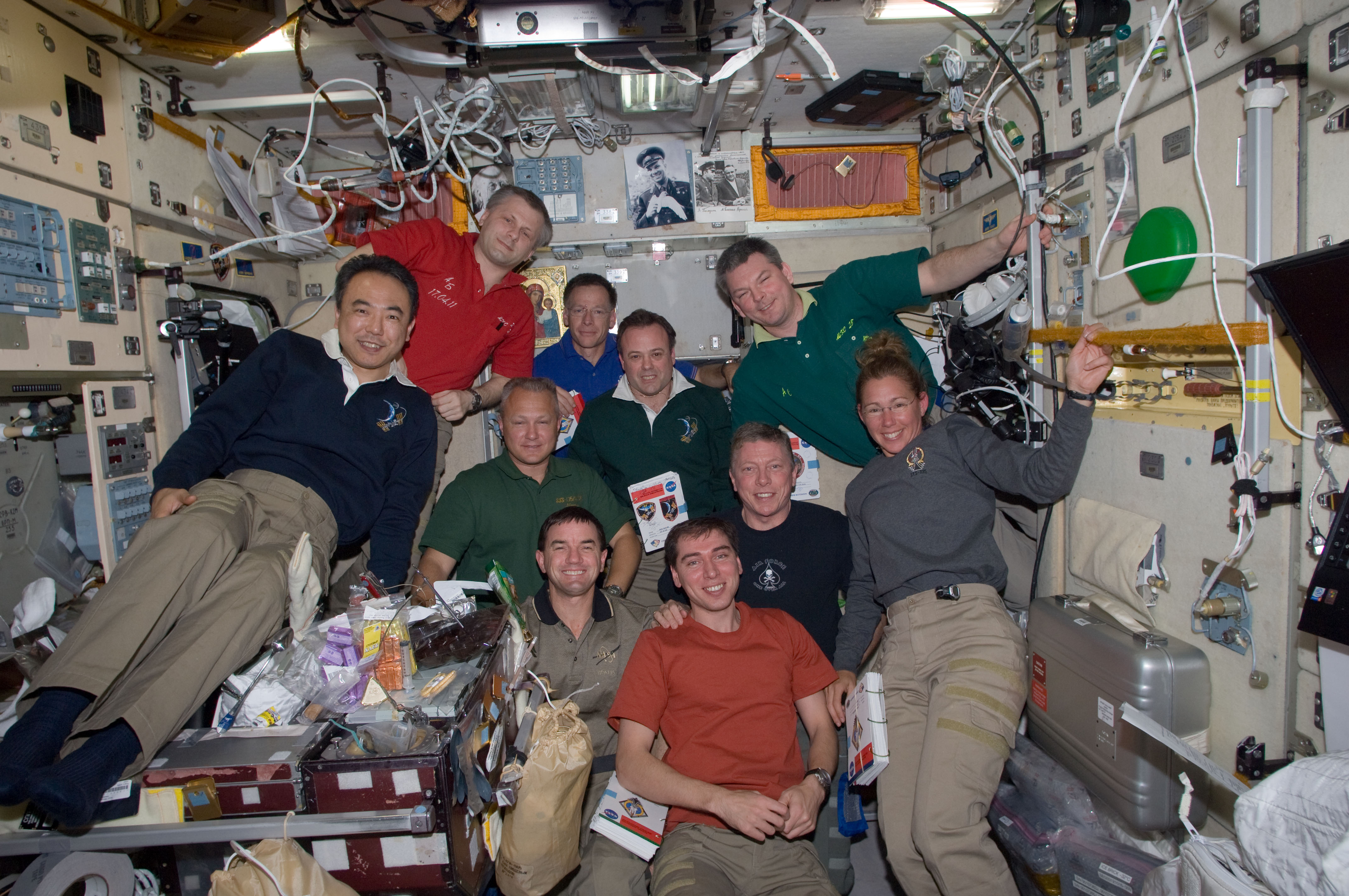
STS-135 and Expedition 28 crews inside the Zvezda service module on the ISS in July 2011

In July 2011, Hurley returned to space on the final shuttle flight, STS-135 on the Space Shuttle Atlantis. This mission launched on July 8 and landed back at Kennedy SLF Runway 15 on July 21. The mission delivered the Multi-Purpose Logistics Module (MPLM) Raffaello and a Lightweight Multi-Purpose Carrier (LMC) to the International Space Station and tested a system which investigated the potential of robotically refueling existing spacecraft. STS-135 mission duration was 12 days, 18 hours, 27 minutes and 56 seconds.

After returning to Earth, he served as the Assistant Director, New Programs for the Flight Crew Operations Directorate (FCOD) at Johnson Space Center. In August 2014, he became the Assistant Director for the Commercial Crew Program following the merger of Flight Operations and Mission Operations.

=== SpaceX-DM2 ===
In July 2015, NASA announced Hurley as one of the first astronauts for U.S. commercial spaceflights. Subsequently, he started working with Boeing and SpaceX to train in their commercial crew vehicles, along with the other chosen astronauts Sunita Williams, Robert Behnken and Eric Boe. In August 2018, Hurley was assigned to SpaceX-DM2, the first test flight of the SpaceX Crew Dragon. Following the in-flight abort test of Crew Dragon, Hurley was confirmed to be the flight's commander. Hurley and fellow crewmember Bob Behnken were humorously compared in news and social media to the fictional brothers Bob and Doug McKenzie because of their friendship when they participated in the first commercial astronaut launch on SpaceX Crew Dragon Demo-2. Crew Dragon successfully launched on May 30, 2020, and successfully docked with the International Space Station on May 31, 2020. The crew joined the ISS Expedition 63 crew, which consisted of NASA astronaut and ISS commander Chris Cassidy and Russian cosmonauts Ivan Vagner and Anatoli Ivanishin. Crew Dragon undocked from the International Space Station on August 1, 2020, and successfully returned to Earth on August 2, 2020, after splashing down in the Gulf of Mexico off the coast of Pensacola, Florida.

Demo-2 Gallery
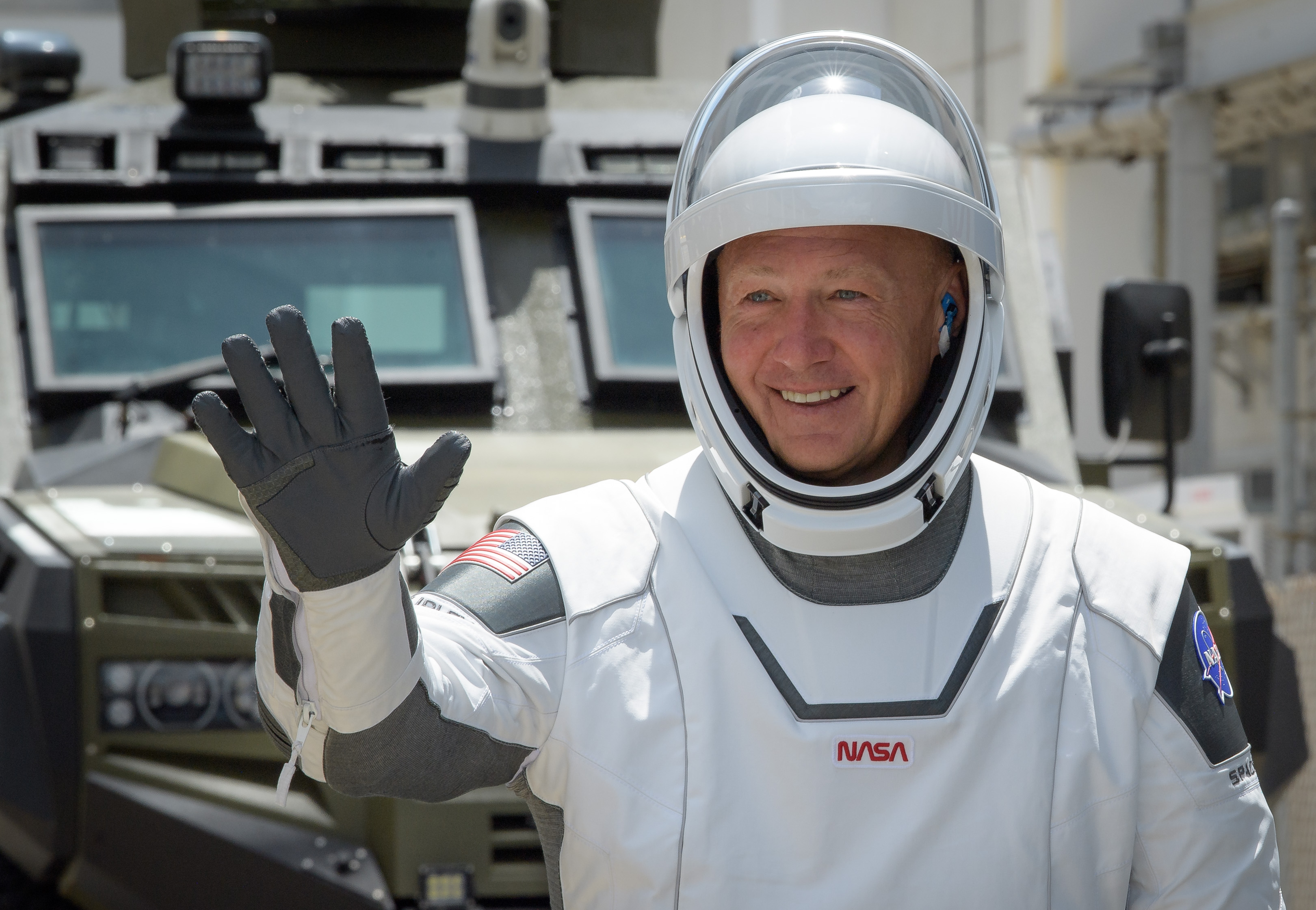
Douglas Hurley, departing the Neil A. Armstrong Operations and Checkout Building before Demo-2 launch.

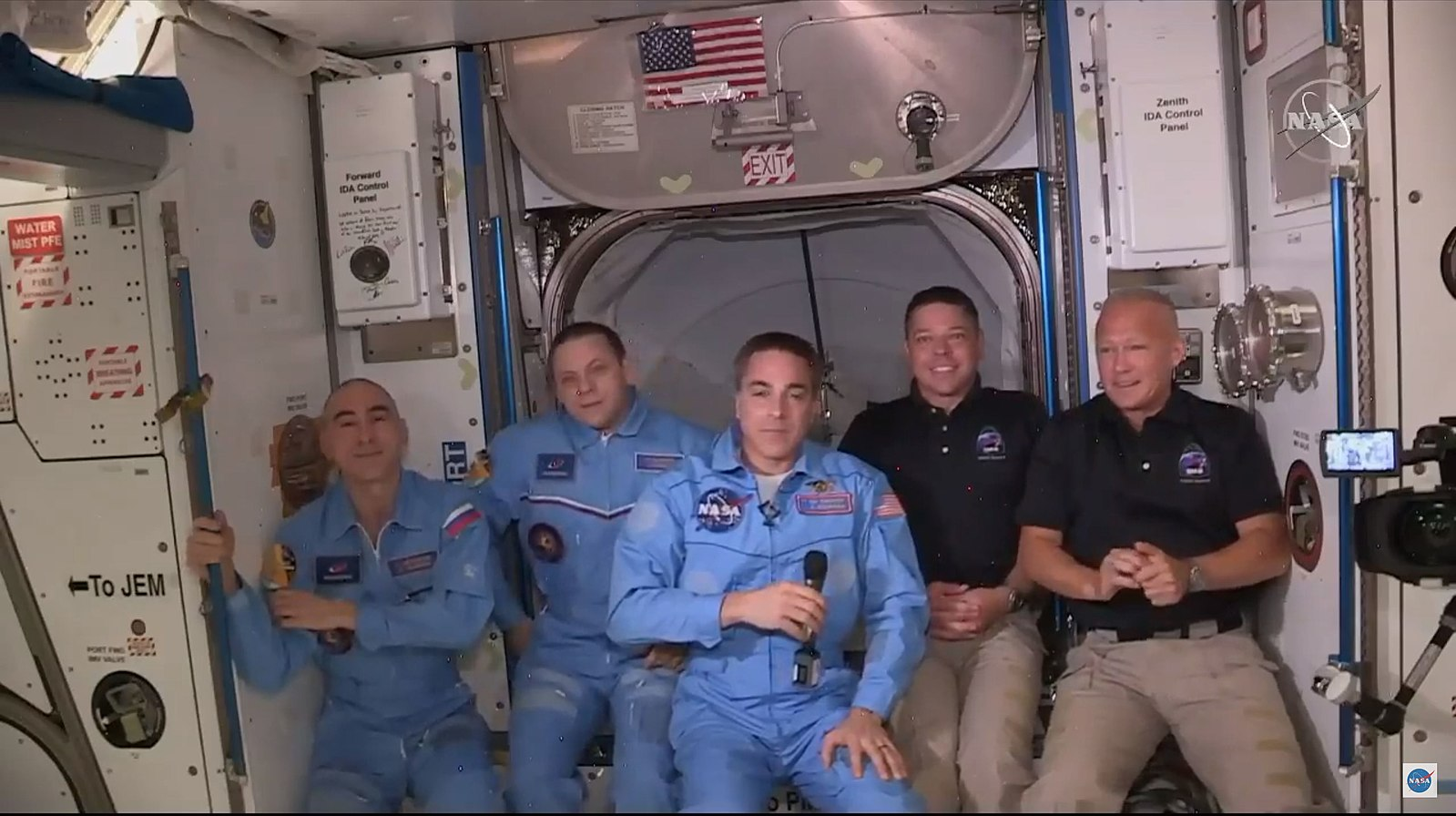
ISS and Demo 2 crews after hatch opening

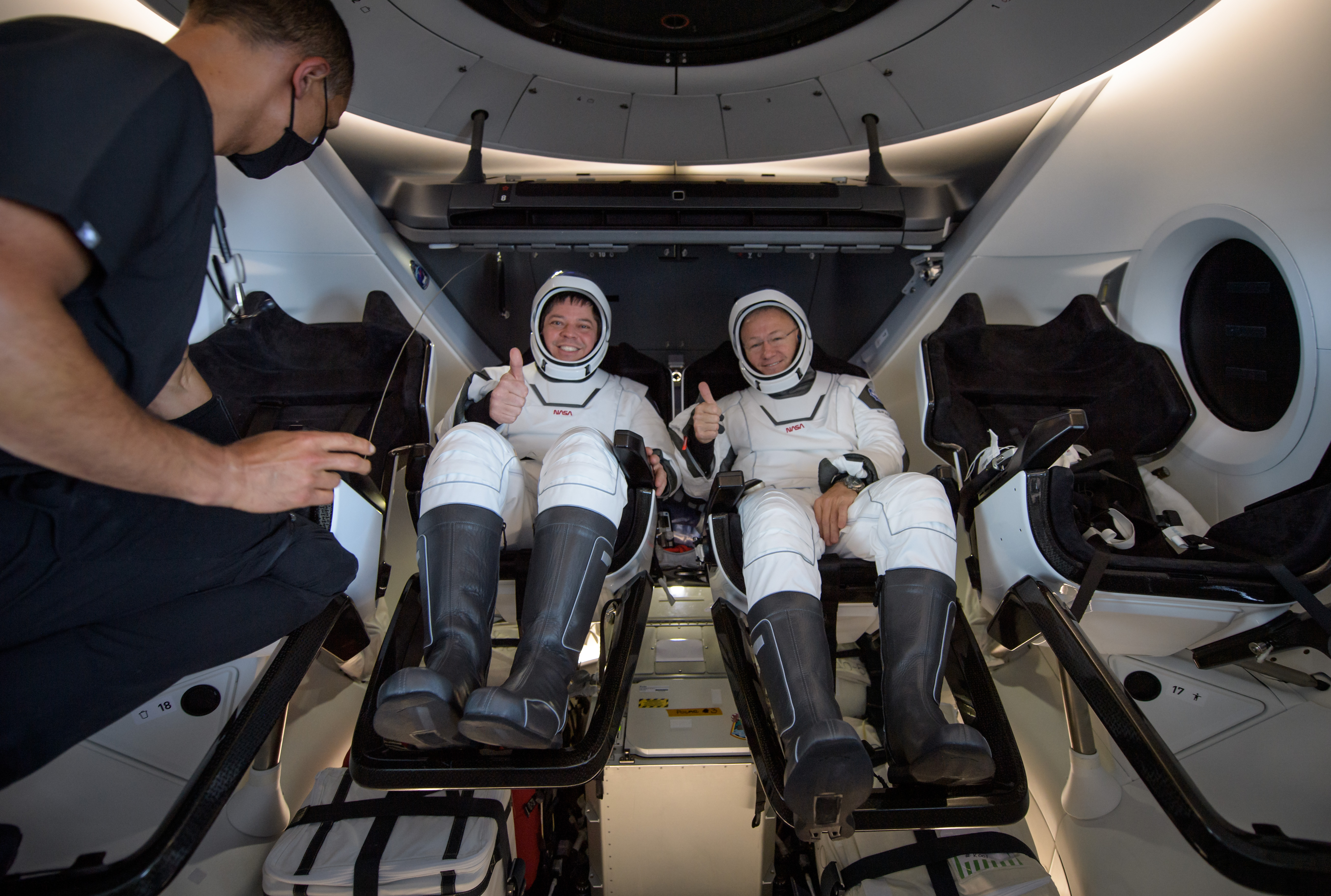
Robert Behnken, and Douglas Hurley are seen inside Endeavour onboard GO Navigator after splashdown.

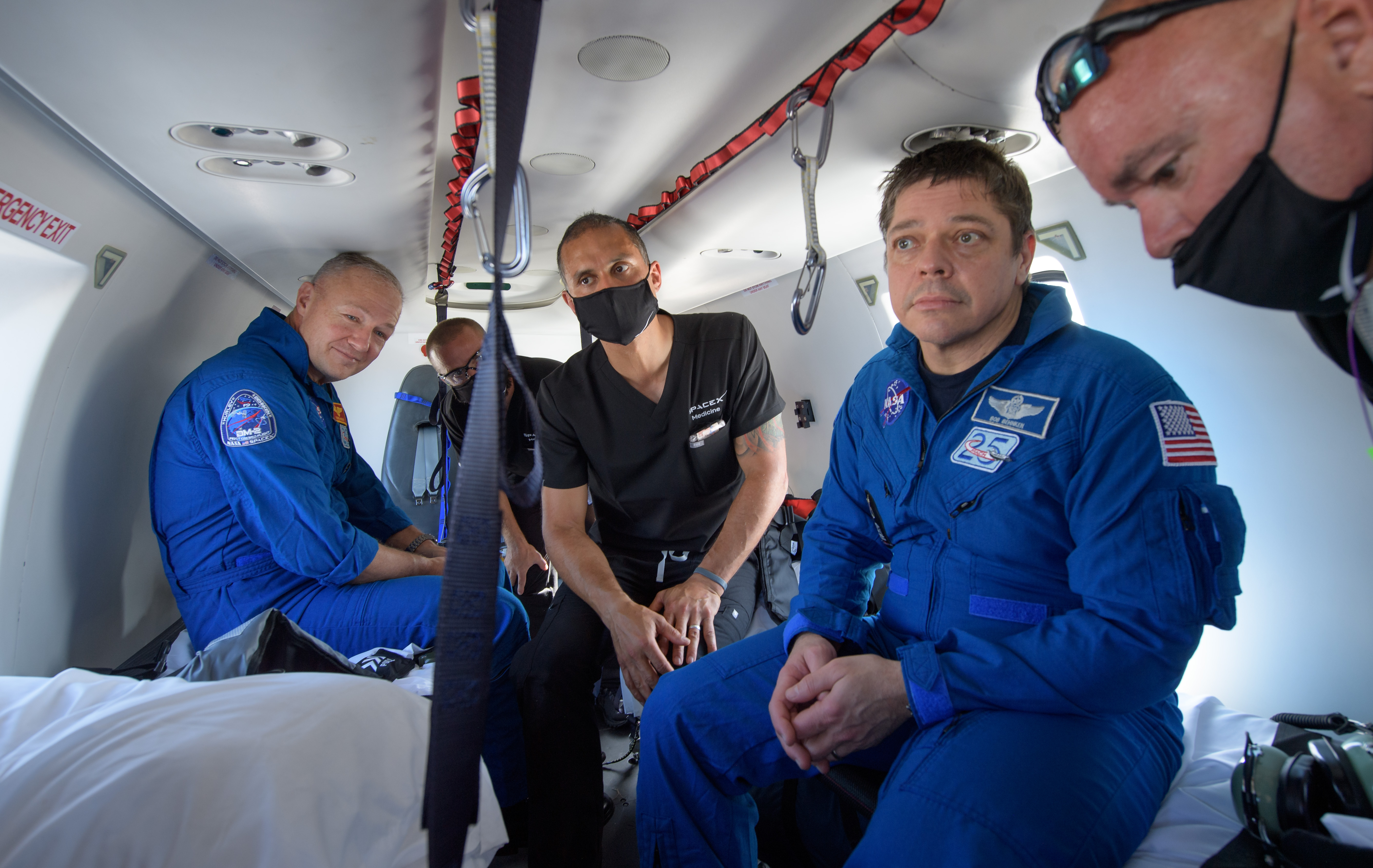
Douglas Hurley prepares to depart a helicopter at Naval Air Station Pensacola.

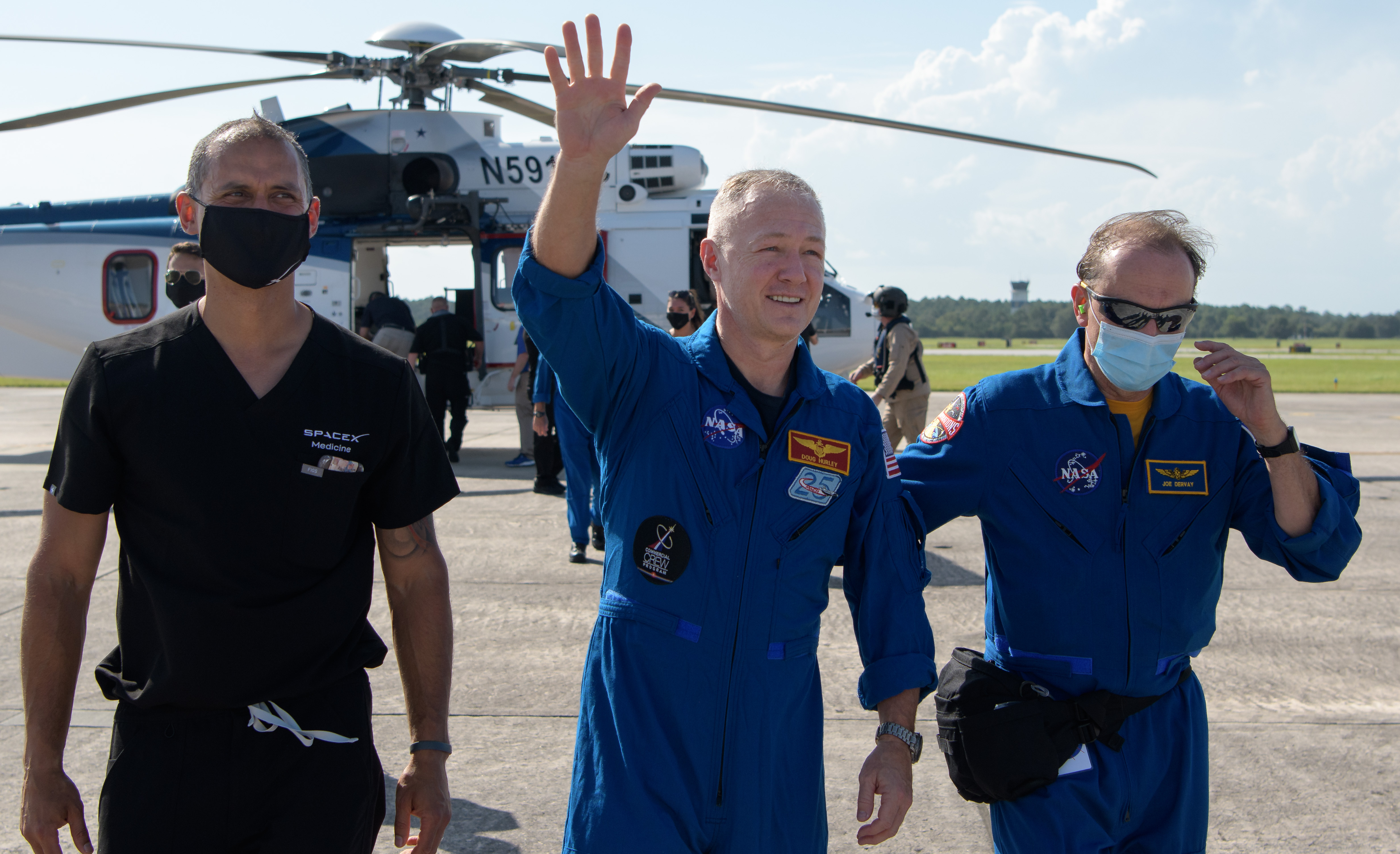
Douglas Hurley waves to onlookers as he boards a plane at Naval Air Station Pensacola.

=== Retirement from NASA ===
On July 16, 2021, NASA announced that Hurley would be retiring from the agency after 21 years of service. In the announcement released on the NASA website, NASA administrator Bill Nelson stated, "Doug Hurley is an exceptional astronaut whose leadership and expertise have been invaluable to NASA's space program. His impact on the agency transcends his impressive work in spaceflight, inspiring us to take on bold endeavors. I extend my deepest gratitude to Doug and wish him success in his next adventure."

== Honors ==
- Hurley is a recipient of the Stephen A. Hazelrigg Memorial Award for best test pilot/engineer team, Naval Strike Aircraft Test Squadron. He was awarded the Meritorious Service Medal, two Navy and Marine Corps Commendation Medals and various other service awards. He received the NASA Superior Accomplishment Award in 2004, 2005, 2006 and 2007.
- SpaceX purchased these two ships for towing and supporting autonomous spaceport drone ship and fairing recovery operations on the east coast in May 2021. These two ships were named in honour of Hurley and his Demo-2, crewmate, Bob Behnken as Doug and Bob. The earlier names of the ships, Bob and Doug were Ella G and Ingrid respectively.
- On January 31, 2023, Hurley was awarded the Congressional Space Medal of Honor for NASA's SpaceX Demonstration Mission-2 (Demo-2) to the International Space Station in 2020.

== Personal life ==
Hurley is married to fellow NASA astronaut Karen Nyberg. They have one son and live in League City, Texas.
