= Soyuz TMA-10M =

2013 Russian crewed spaceflight to the ISS

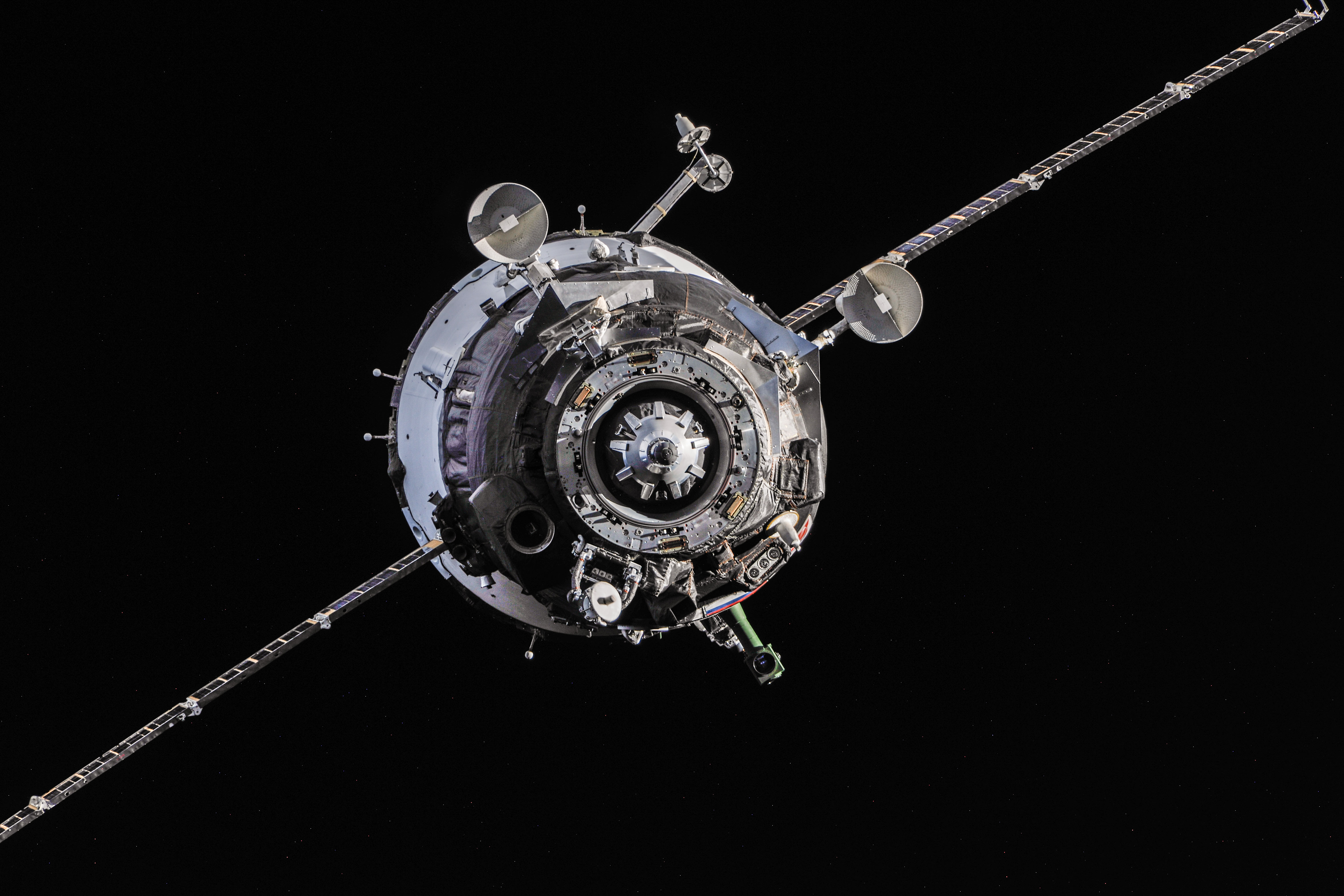
- Soyuz TMA-10M spacecraft approaches the ISS, 26 September 2013
- Mission type: ISS crew rotation
- Operator: Roscosmos
- COSPAR ID: 2013-054A
- SATCAT no.: 39263
- Mission duration: 166 days, 6 hours, 26 minutes

Spacecraft properties
- Spacecraft: Soyuz 11F732A47 No.710
- Spacecraft type: Soyuz-TMA 11F747
- Manufacturer: RKK Energia

Crew
- Crew size: 3
- Members: Oleg V. Kotov; Sergey Ryazansky; Michael S. Hopkins
- Callsign: Pulsar

Start of mission
- Launch date: 25 September 2013, 20:58:50 UTC
- Rocket: Soyuz-FG
- Launch site: Baikonur 1/5

End of mission
- Landing date: 11 March 2014, 03:24 UTC

Orbital parameters
- Reference system: Geocentric
- Regime: Low Earth
- Perigee altitude: 420 kilometres (260 mi)
- Apogee altitude: 424 kilometres (263 mi)
- Inclination: 51.65 degrees
- Period: 92.87 minutes
- Epoch: 27 September 2013, 01:37:25 UTC

Docking with ISS
- Docking port: Poisk zenith
- Docking date: 26 September 2013, 02:45 UTC
- Undocking date: 11 March 2014, 00:02 UTC
- Time docked: 165 days, 21 hours, 17 minutes
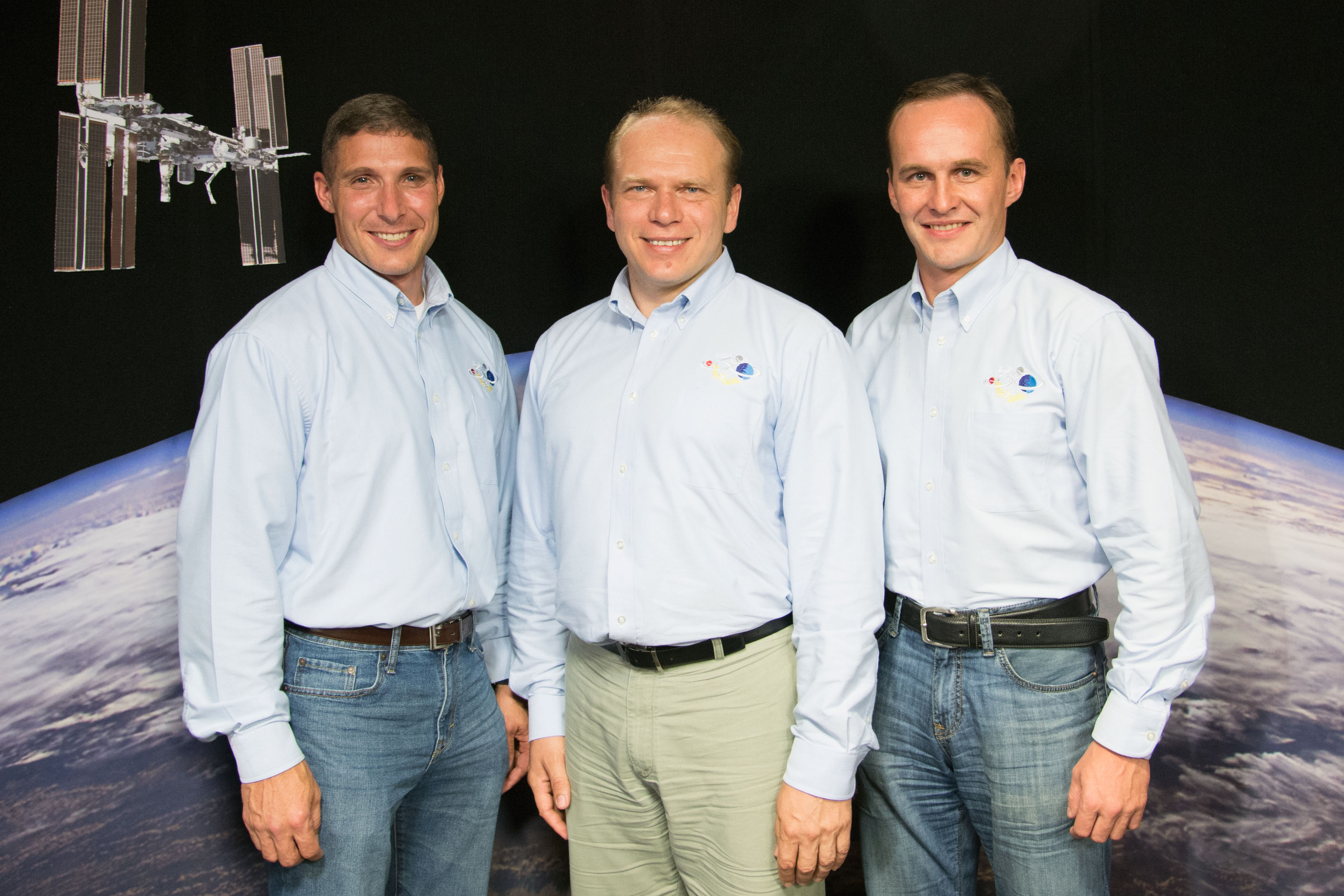
- (l-r) Hopkins, Kotov and Ryazansky Soyuz programme (Crewed missions)

Soyuz TMA-10M was a 2013 flight to the International Space Station. It transported three members of the Expedition 37 crew to the International Space Station. TMA-10M is the 119th flight of a Soyuz spacecraft, the first flight launching in 1967. The Soyuz remained on board the space station for the Expedition 38/39 increment to serve as an emergency escape vehicle.

== Crew ==
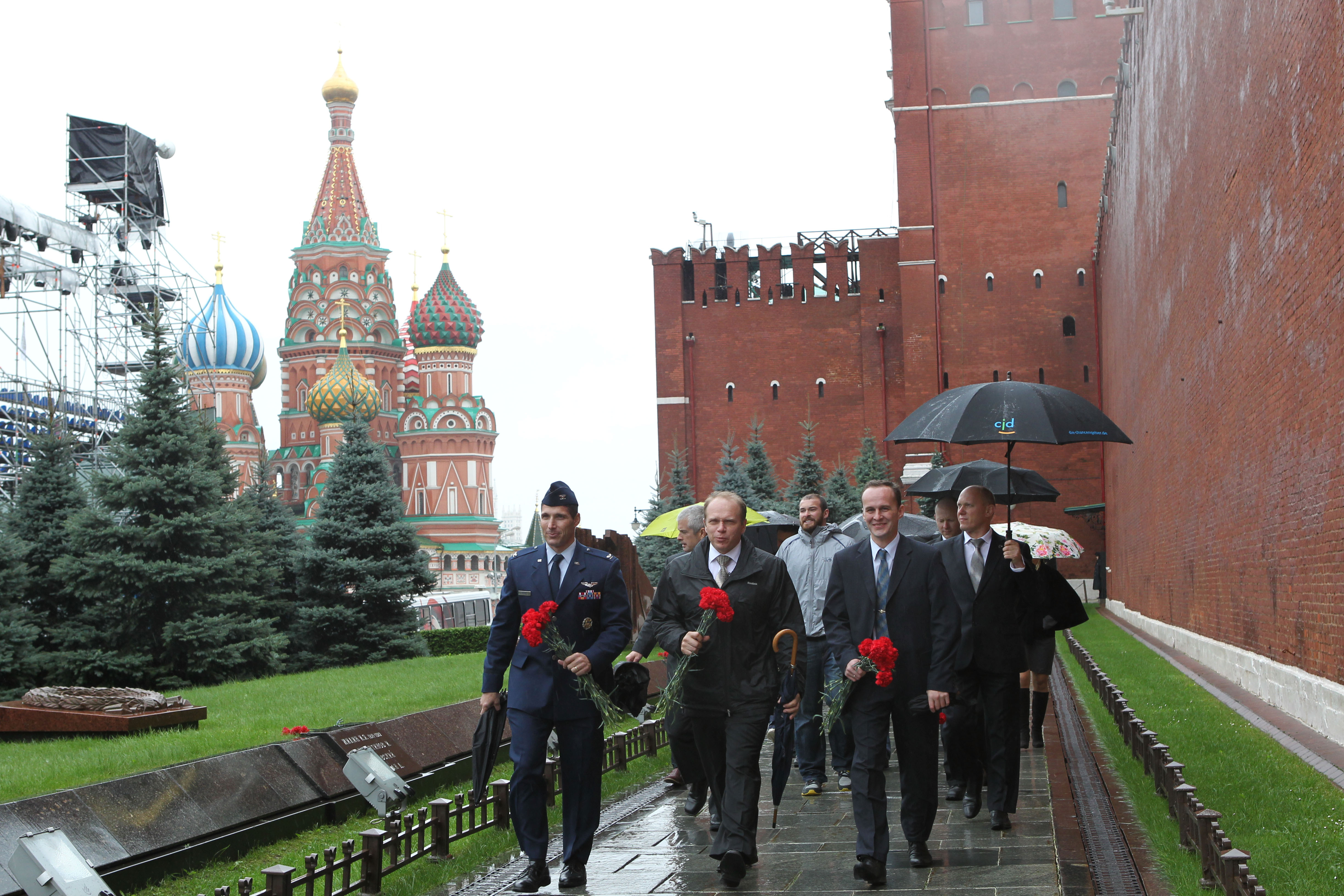
The Soyuz TMA-10M crew members conduct their ceremonial tour of Red Square on 6 September 2013.

Position	Crew Member
Commander	(Russia) Oleg Kotov, Roscosmos; Expedition 37; Third and last spaceflight
Flight Engineer 1	(Russia) Sergey Ryazansky, Roscosmos; Expedition 37; First spaceflight
Flight Engineer 2	(United States) Michael Hopkins, NASA; Expedition 37; First spaceflight

=== Backup crew ===
Position	Crew Member
Commander	(Russia) Aleksandr Skvortsov, Roscosmos
Flight Engineer 1	(Russia) Oleg Artemyev, Roscosmos
Flight Engineer 2	(United States) Steven Swanson, NASA
