= Vining, Minnesota =

City in Minnesota, United States

- City
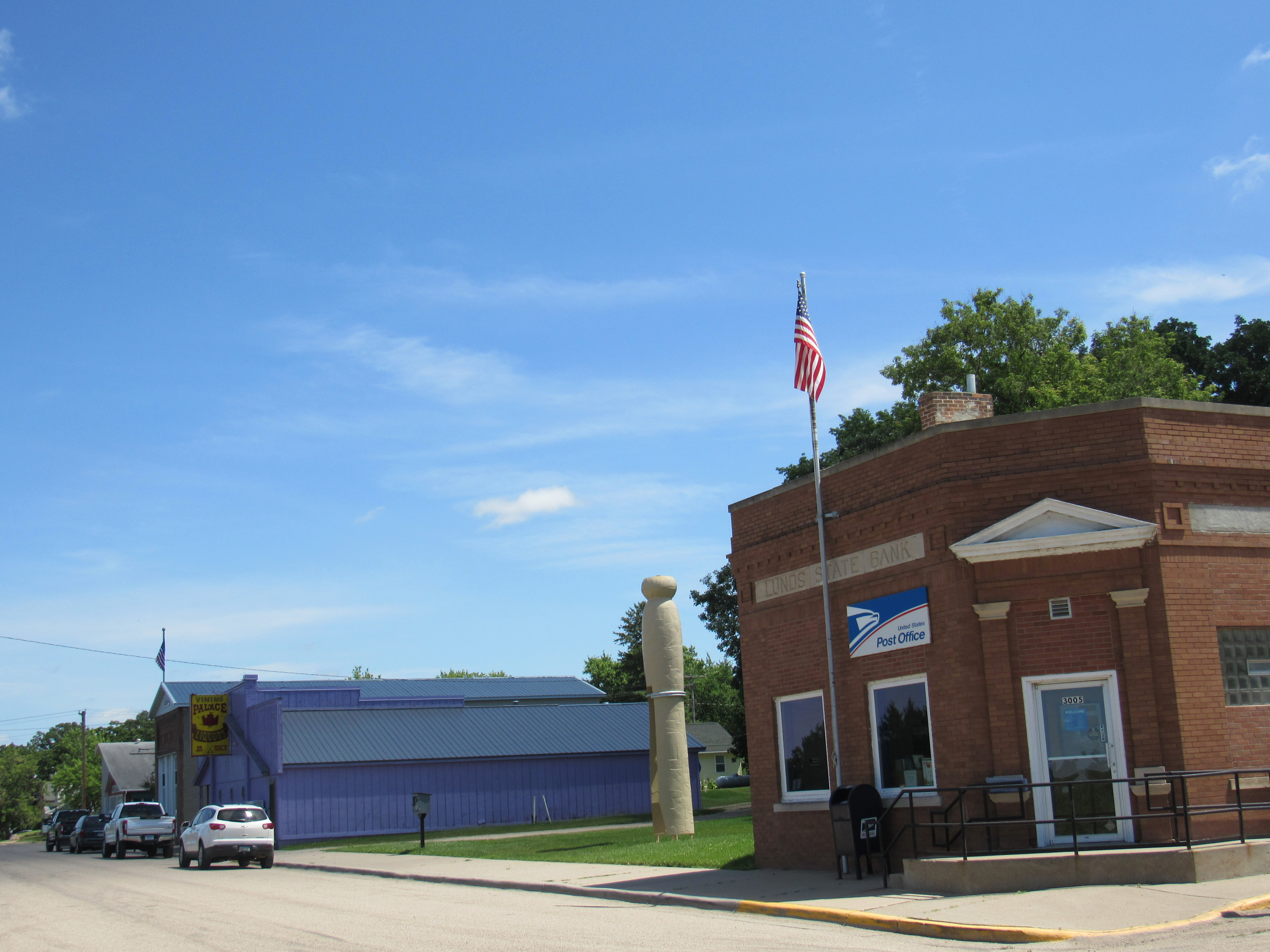
- Buildings along Front Street.

- Location of Vining, Minnesota
- Coordinates: 46°15′43″N 95°32′06″W
- Country: United States
- State: Minnesota
- County: Otter Tail
- Platted: September 1882
- Incorporated: April 26, 1908

Government
  - Mayor: Lynda Rubink

Area
  - Total: 1.189 sq mi (3.079 km^{2})
  - Land: 1.150 sq mi (2.979 km^{2})
  - Water: 0.039 sq mi (0.100 km^{2})
- Elevation: 1,401 ft (427 m)

Population (2020)
  - Total: 62
  - Estimate (2022): 60
  - Density: 53.9/sq mi (20.81/km^{2})
- Time zone: UTC−6 (Central (CST))
  - Summer (DST): UTC−5 (CDT)
- ZIP Code: 56588
- Area code: 218
- FIPS code: 27-67216
- GNIS feature ID: 2397145
- Sales tax: 7.375%

Vining is a city in Otter Tail County, Minnesota, United States. The population was 62 at the 2020 census.

== History ==
Vining was platted in 1882. A post office has been in operation at Vining since 1882. Vining was incorporated in 1909.

Nyberg Park, located on Front Street, features a collection of scrap metal sculptures created by Vining resident Ken Nyberg.

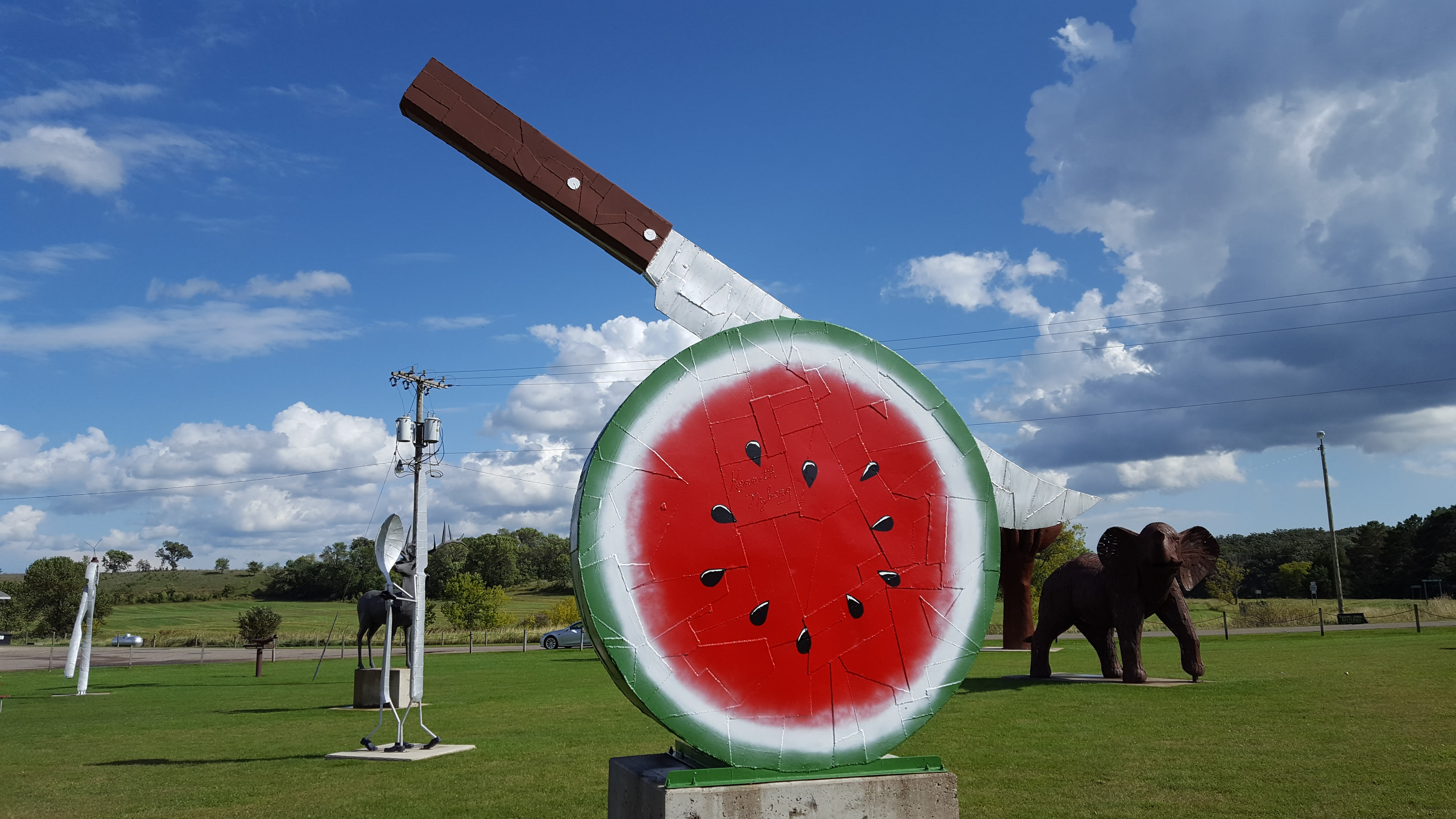
Metal sculptures at Nyberg Park.

== Geography ==
According to the United States Census Bureau, the city has a total area of 1.189 square miles (3.08 km^{2}), of which 1.150 square miles (2.98 km^{2}) is land and 0.039 square miles (0.10 km^{2}) is water.

Minnesota State Highway 210 serves as a main route in the community.

== Demographics ==
Historical population
Census	Pop.	Note	%±
1900	249		—
1910	212		−14.9%
1920	241		13.7%
1930	222		−7.9%
1940	176		−20.7%
1950	180		2.3%
1960	136		−24.4%
1970	121		−11.0%
1980	87		−28.1%
1990	84		−3.4%
2000	68		−19.0%
2010	78		14.7%
2020	62		−20.5%
2022 (est.)	60		−3.2%
U.S. Decennial Census; 2020 Census

=== 2010 census ===
As of the 2010 census, there were 78 people, 34 households, and 20 families living in the city. The population density was 60.9 inhabitants per square mile (23.5/km^{2}). There were 43 housing units at an average density of 33.6 per square mile (13.0/km^{2}). The racial makeup of the city was 91.0% White and 9.0% from two or more races. Hispanic or Latino of any race were 1.3% of the population.

There were 34 households, of which 17.6% had children under the age of 18 living with them, 44.1% were married couples living together, 8.8% had a female householder with no husband present, 5.9% had a male householder with no wife present, and 41.2% were non-families. 41.2% of all households were made up of individuals, and 23.5% had someone living alone who was 65 years of age or older. The average household size was 2.29 and the average family size was 3.00.

The median age in the city was 46.5 years. 20.5% of residents were under the age of 18; 11.5% were between the ages of 18 and 24; 17.8% were from 25 to 44; 21.7% were from 45 to 64; and 28.2% were 65 years of age or older. The gender makeup of the city was 52.6% male and 47.4% female.

=== 2000 census ===
As of the 2000 census, there were 68 people, 32 households, and 20 families living in the city. The population density was 53.6 inhabitants per square mile (20.7/km^{2}). There were 46 housing units at an average density of 36.3 per square mile (14.0/km^{2}). The racial makeup of the city was 95.59% White, and 4.41% from two or more races.

There were 32 households, out of which 21.9% had children under the age of 18 living with them, 56.3% were married couples living together, 3.1% had a female householder with no husband present, and 37.5% were non-families. 37.5% of all households were made up of individuals, and 21.9% had someone living alone who was 65 years of age or older. The average household size was 2.13 and the average family size was 2.75.

In the city, the population was spread out, with 19.1% under the age of 18, 2.9% from 18 to 24, 25.0% from 25 to 44, 20.6% from 45 to 64, and 32.4% who were 65 years of age or older. The median age was 50 years. For every 100 females, there were 106.1 males. For every 100 females age 18 and over, there were 96.4 males.

The median income for a household in the city was $21,250, and the median income for a family was $41,875. Males had a median income of $26,667 versus $21,875 for females. The per capita income for the city was $17,866. There were no families and 9.4% of the population living below the poverty line, including no under eighteens and 11.8% of those over 64.

== Notable person ==
Vining is the hometown of NASA astronaut Karen Nyberg.
