= Karen Nyberg =

American mechanical engineer and astronaut (born 1969)

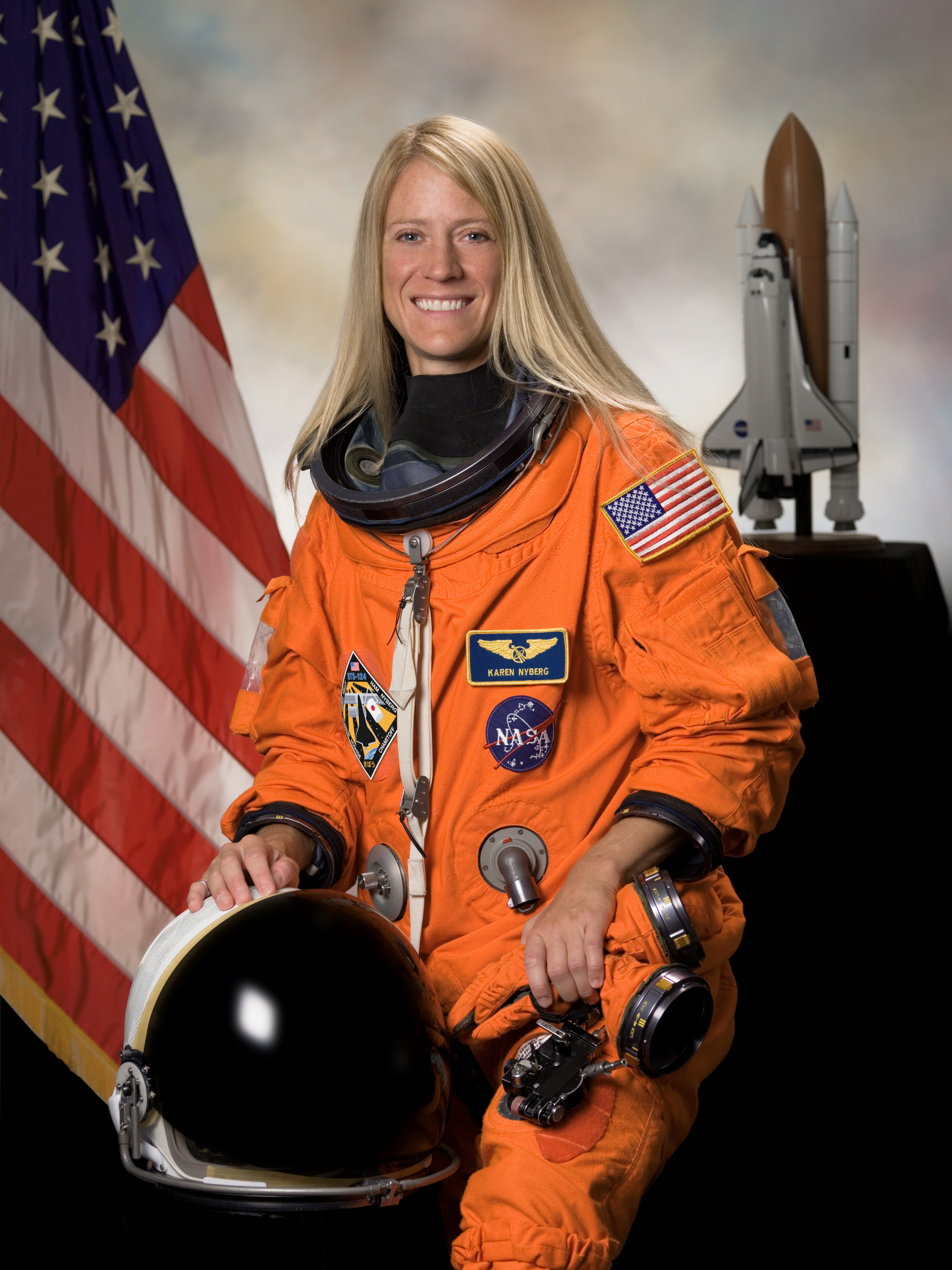
- Born: Karen LuJean Nyberg; October 7, 1969 (age 57); Parkers Prairie, Minnesota, U.S.
- Education: University of North Dakota (BS); University of Texas, Austin (MS); University of Texas, Austin (PhD)
- Spouse: Doug Hurley
- Space career

NASA astronaut
- Time in space: 180d, 31m, 07s
- Selection: NASA Group 18 (2000)
- Mission: STS-124; Soyuz TMA-09M (Expedition 36/37)
- Mission insignia
- Retired: March 31, 2020
- Website: Official website

Karen LuJean Nyberg (born October 7, 1969) is an American mechanical engineer and retired NASA astronaut. Nyberg became the 50th woman in space on her first mission in 2008. Nyberg holds a Ph.D. in mechanical engineering. She started her space career in 1991 and spent a total of 180 days in space in 2008 and 2013 as a mission specialist on STS-124 and a flight engineer on Soyuz TMA-09M.

== Early life and education ==
Nyberg was born on October 7, 1969, in Parkers Prairie, Minnesota, to parents Kenneth and Phyllis Nyberg. She graduated from the public high school in Henning, Minnesota, in 1988.

Nyberg graduated summa cum laude with a bachelor's degree in mechanical engineering from the University of North Dakota in 1994. She continued her studies at the University of Texas at Austin, earning a master of science in mechanical engineering in 1996. Her studies centered on human thermoregulation and experimental metabolic testing and control, and focusing on the control of thermal neutrality in space suits. This work at the Austin BioHeat Transfer Laboratory led to her doctorate in mechanical engineering in 1998, also from the University of Texas at Austin.

== Career ==
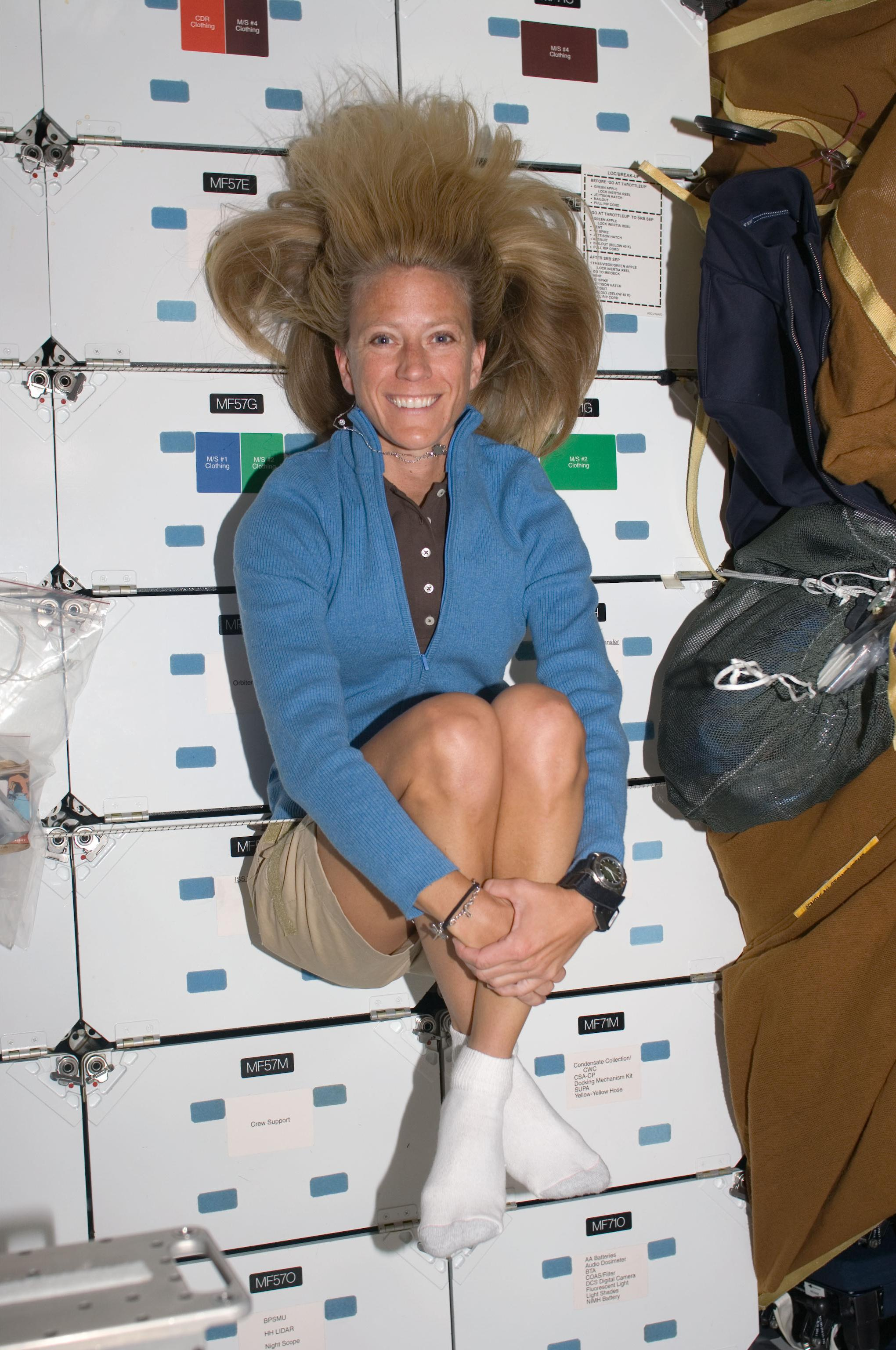
Karen Nyberg weightless on the middeck of Discovery while docked with the ISS

She was selected as an astronaut candidate by NASA in July 2000. After two years of training and evaluation she qualified as a mission specialist and was assigned for technical duties in the Astronaut Office Station Operations Branch. She was crew support astronaut for the Expedition 6 crew during their six-month mission on the ISS. In July 2006, Nyberg took part in NEEMO 10, a deep-sea training and simulation exercise at the Aquarius underwater laboratory to help NASA prepare for the return of astronauts to the Moon and crewed missions to Mars. Nyberg and her crewmates lived and worked underwater for seven days.

Nyberg was in the crew of STS-124, which flew to the ISS in May 2008. This was the second of three flights to deliver components to complete the Japanese Kibō laboratory. In May 2009, she was assigned to the STS-132 mission, which launched in May 2010, but had to be replaced three months after assignment due to a temporary medical condition. Nyberg then served in a technical role until she received her next assignment, as a flight engineer on the Expedition 36/37.

In 2013 Nyberg served as a flight engineer on ISS Expedition 36 and Expedition 37, having launched on Soyuz TMA-09M. On the 50th anniversary on June 16, 2013, of Vostok 6, the first spaceshot by a woman, Valentina Tereshkova, Nyberg was one of only two women then in space, the other being Chinese astronaut Wang Yaping aboard the Tiangong-1 on the Shenzhou 10 mission. In September she posted a photograph of a stuffed dinosaur she had created in orbit from space station scraps, which is thought to be the first stuffed animal handcrafted in space. Stuffed animals are often taken to space, for sentimental purposes but also because they are good zero-gravity indicators: they start to float when entering the orbit. During this mission, Nyberg completed diverse tasks, for example simulating an emergency scenario training.

Since the end of her 2013 mission, Nyberg has worked for NASA in the Space Shuttle branch, the Exploration branch, and as Chief of the Robotics branch.

Nyberg retired from NASA in March 2020.

== Personal life ==
Nyberg's hometown is Vining, Minnesota. She is of Norwegian ancestry. She is married to fellow astronaut Doug Hurley and they have a son. They reside together in League City, Texas. Her recreational interests include running, sewing and quilting, drawing and painting, backpacking, playing piano, and spending time with her family.

== Awards and honors ==
She has won a host of awards including the UND Young Alumni Achievement Award (2004); Space Act Award (1993); NASA JSC Patent Application Award (1993); NASA Tech Briefs Award (1993); NASA JSC Cooperative Education Special Achievement Award (1994); Joyce Medalen Society of Women Engineers Award (1993–94); D.J. Robertson Award of Academic Achievement (1992) and University of North Dakota School of Engineering & Mines Meritorious Service Award (1991–1992).

She was awarded the NASA Distinguished Service Medal in 2014. It is the highest form of recognition by NASA for Government employees.
