= Expedition 36 =

Long-duration mission to the International Space Station

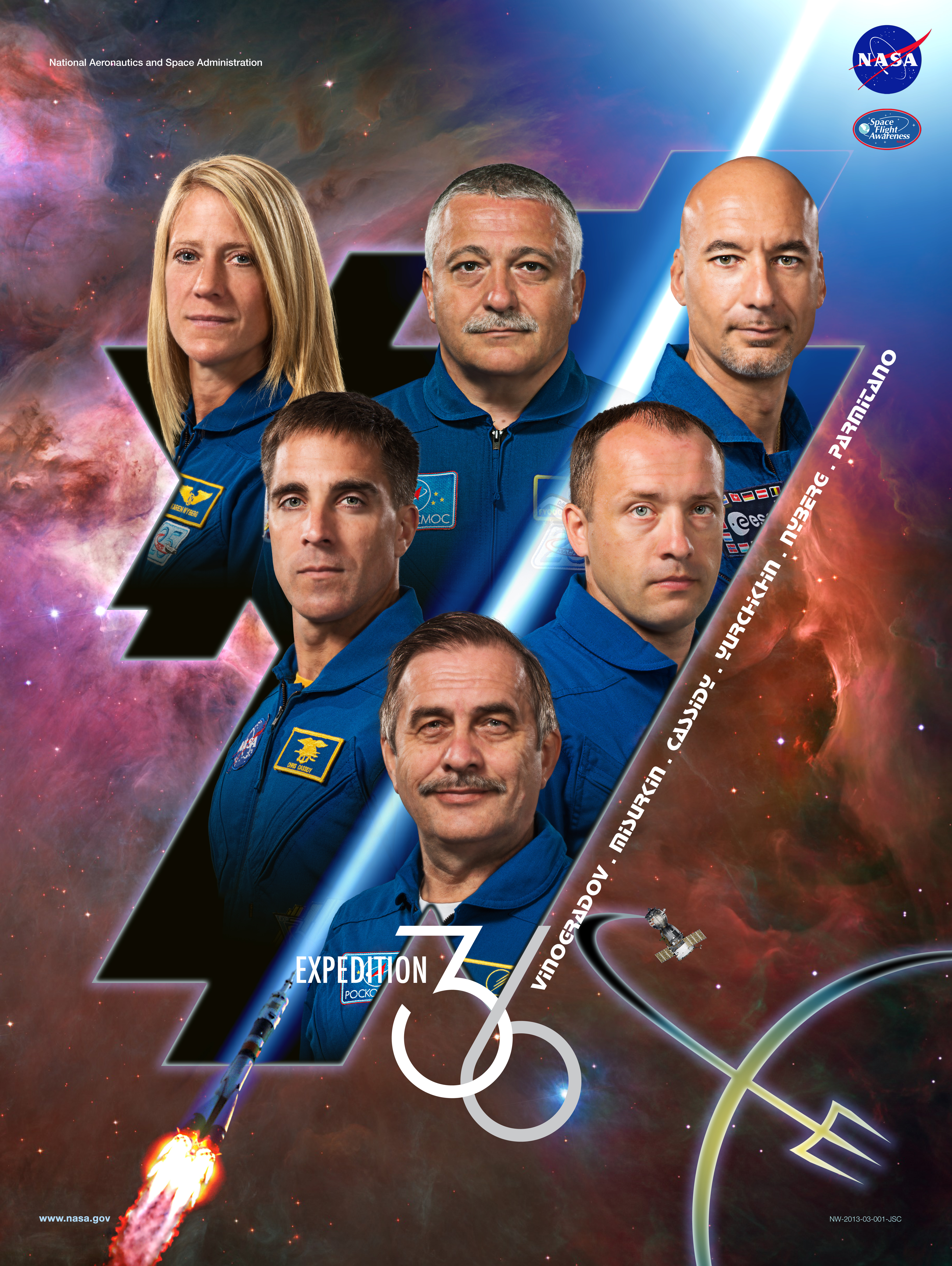
- Promotional Poster
- Mission type: Long-duration expedition

Expedition
- Space station: International Space Station
- Began: 13 May 2013
- Ended: 10 September 2013
- Arrived aboard: Soyuz TMA-08M; Soyuz TMA-09M
- Departed aboard: Soyuz TMA-08M; Soyuz TMA-09M

Crew
- Crew size: 7
- Members: Expedition 35/36: Pavel Vinogradov; Aleksandr Misurkin; Chris Cassidy Expedition 36/37: Karen L. Nyberg; Fyodor Yurchikhin; Luca Parmitano
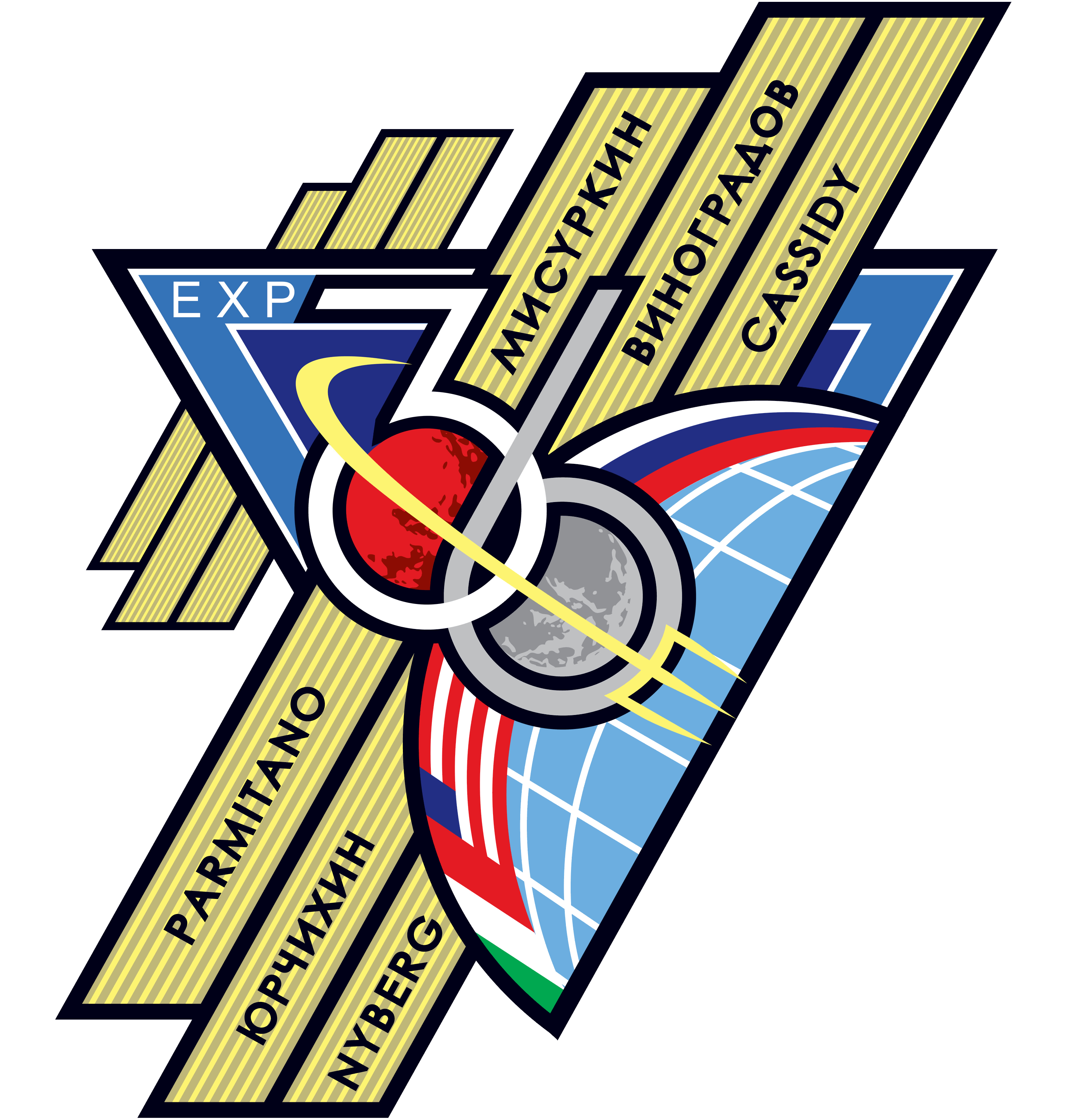
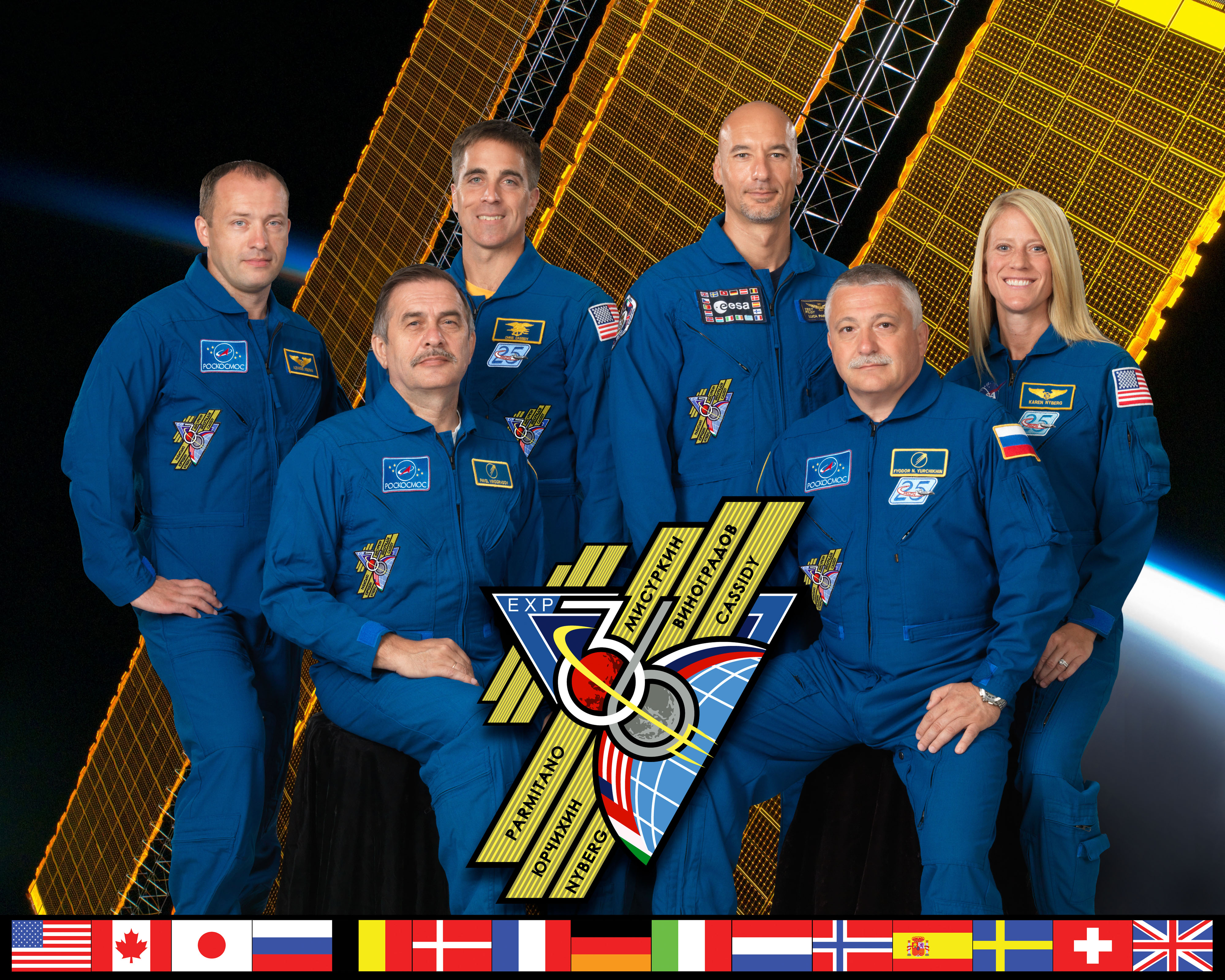
- Expedition 36 mission patch (l-r) Misurkin, Vinogradov, Cassidy, Parmitano, Yurchikhin and Nyberg ISS expeditions

Expedition 36 was the 36th long-duration mission to the International Space Station.

== Crew ==
Position	First Part (May 2013)	Second Part (May 2013 to September 2013)
Commander	Pavel Vinogradov, RSA; Third and last spaceflight	
Flight Engineer 1	Aleksandr Misurkin, RSA; First spaceflight	
Flight Engineer 2	Chris Cassidy, NASA; Second spaceflight	
Flight Engineer 3		Karen L. Nyberg, NASA; Second and last spaceflight
Flight Engineer 4		Fyodor Yurchikhin, RSA; Fourth spaceflight
Flight Engineer 5		Luca Parmitano, ESA; First spaceflight

NASA

== Mission ==
On 2013 June 16, the 50th anniversary of Vostok 6, the first spaceshot by a woman, Valentina Tereshkova, Karen L. Nyberg was one of two women in space, the other being Wang Yaping aboard Tiangong-1 on the Shenzhou 10 mission.

On 2013 July 16, during EVA-23, Luca Parmitano reported that water was steadily leaking into his helmet. Flight controllers elected to abort the EVA immediately, and Parmitano made his way back to the Quest airlock, followed by Chris Cassidy, with whom he was performing the EVA. The airlock began re-pressurizing after a 1-hour and 32 minute spacewalk, and by this time Parmitano was having difficulty seeing, hearing, and speaking due to the amount of water in his suit. After re-pressurization, commander Pavel Vinogradov and crew member Fyodor Yurchikhin quickly removed Parmitano's helmet and soaked up the water with towels. Despite the incident, Parmitano was reported to be in good spirits and suffered no injury.
