= Soyuz TMA-09M =

2013 Russian crewed spaceflight to the ISS

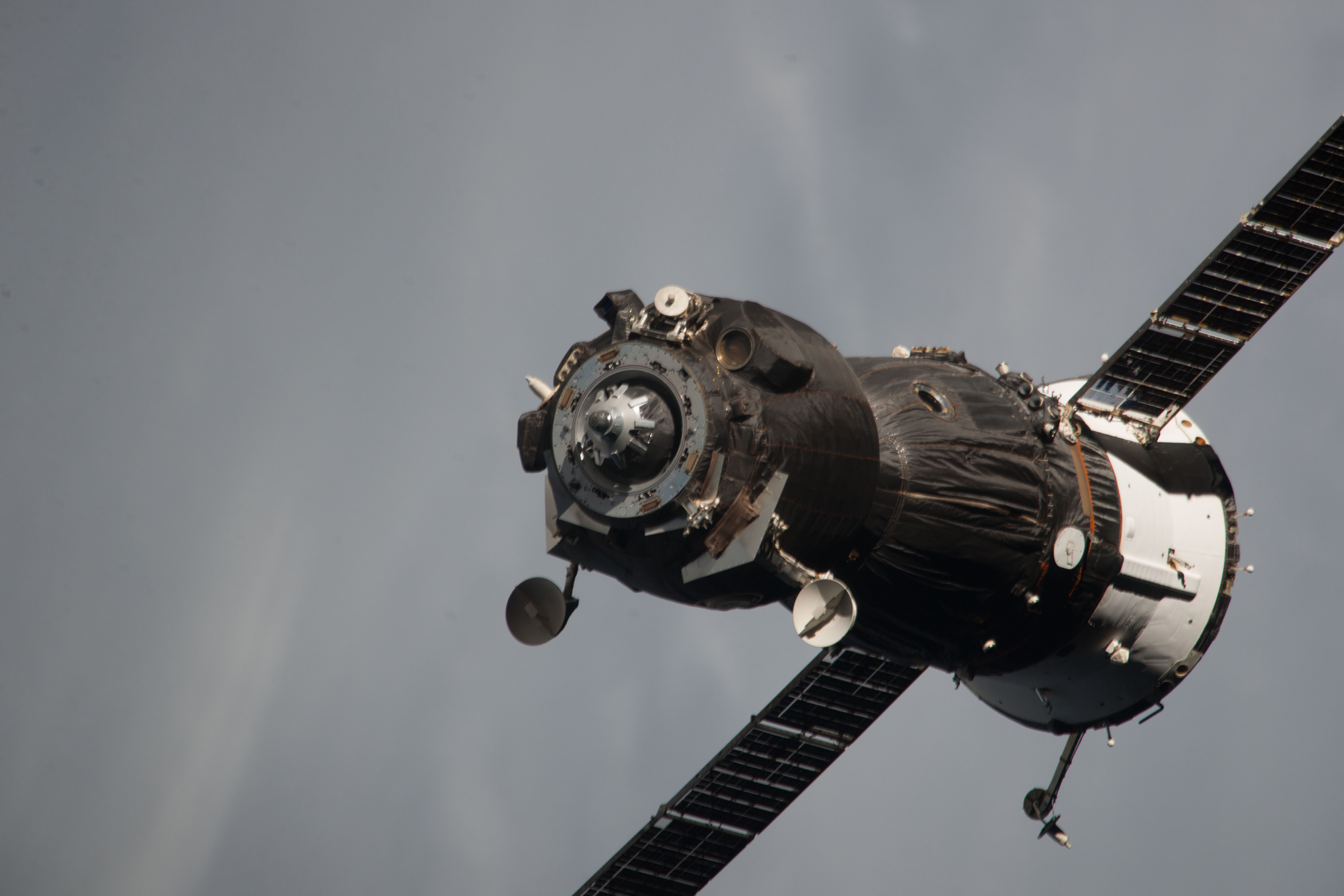
- Soyuz TMA-09M departing from the ISS, 10 November 2013
- Mission type: ISS crew rotation
- Operator: Roscosmos
- COSPAR ID: 2013-025A
- SATCAT no.: 39170
- Mission duration: 166 days, 6 hours, 18 minutes

Spacecraft properties
- Spacecraft: Soyuz 11F732A47 No.709
- Spacecraft type: Soyuz-TMA 11F747
- Manufacturer: RKK Energia

Crew
- Crew size: 3
- Members: Fyodor Yurchikhin; Karen L. Nyberg; Luca Parmitano
- Callsign: Olympus

Start of mission
- Launch date: 28 May 2013, 20:31:24 UTC
- Rocket: Soyuz-FG
- Launch site: Baikonur 1/5

End of mission
- Landing date: 11 November 2013, 02:49 UTC

Orbital parameters
- Reference system: Geocentric
- Regime: Low Earth
- Perigee altitude: 408 kilometres (254 mi)
- Apogee altitude: 422 kilometres (262 mi)
- Inclination: 51.65 degrees
- Period: 92.87 minutes
- Epoch: 29 May 2013, 02:47:30 UTC

Docking with ISS
- Docking port: Rassvet nadir
- Docking date: 29 May 2013, 02:10 UTC
- Undocking date: 1 November 2013, 23:26 UTC
- Time docked: 156 days

Docking with ISS (Relocation)
- Docking port: Zvezda aft
- Docking date: 1 November 2013; 08:33 UTC
- Undocking date: 10 November 2013; 08:54 UTC
- Time docked: 9d 21m
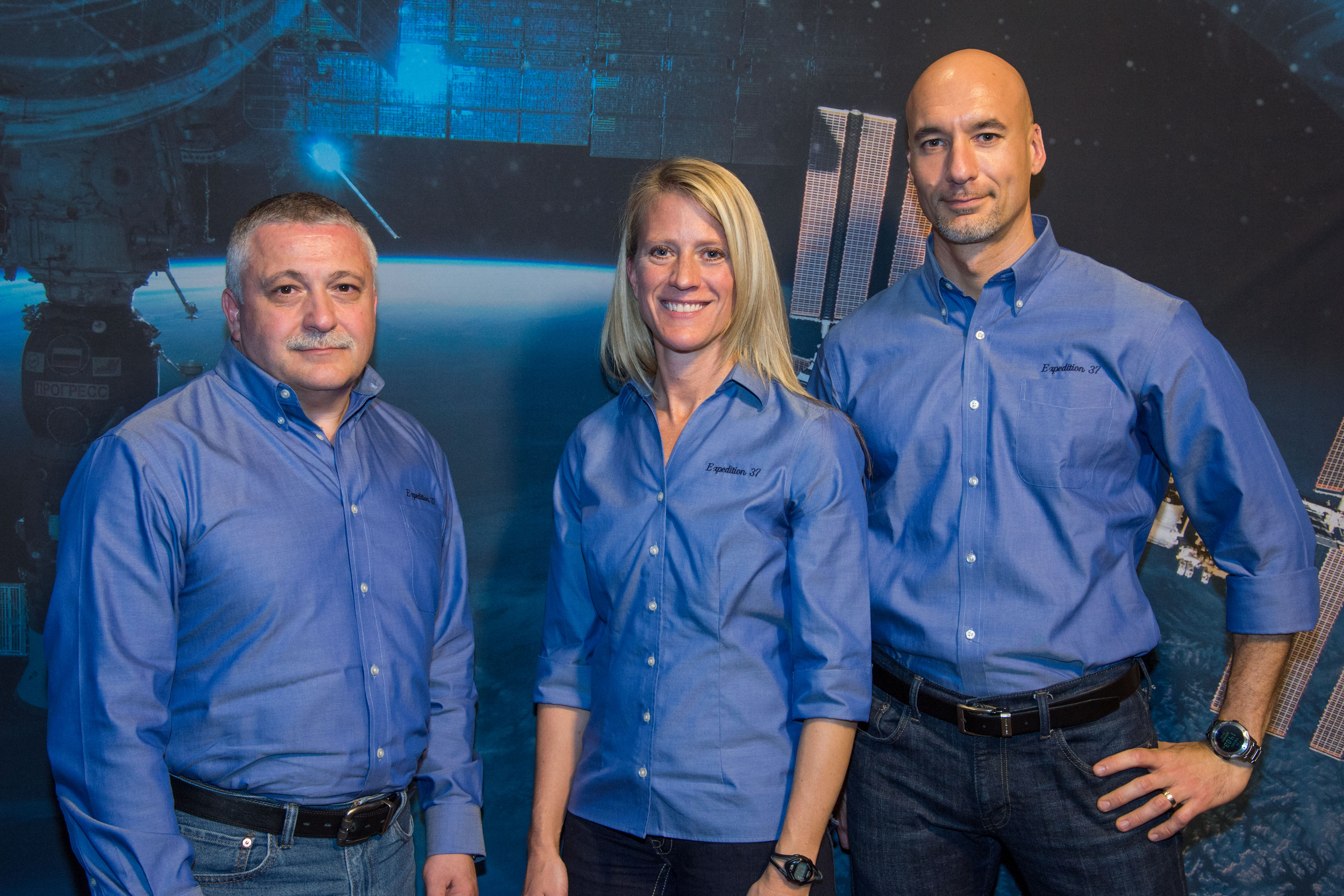
- (l-r) Yurchikhin, Nyberg and Parmitano Soyuz programme

Soyuz TMA-09M was a Russian Soyuz mission to the International Space Station. It transported three members of the Expedition 36 crew to the space station. The Soyuz remained docked to the space station during Expeditions 36 and 37 to serve as an emergency escape vehicle. The spacecraft landed on 11 November 2013, carrying the same three cosmonauts who were aboard for launch. The crew of Soyuz TMA-09M consisted of Fyodor Yurchikhin of Roscosmos, Karen Nyberg of NASA and Luca Parmitano of the European Space Agency. The European segment of the mission was called "Volare".

== Crew ==
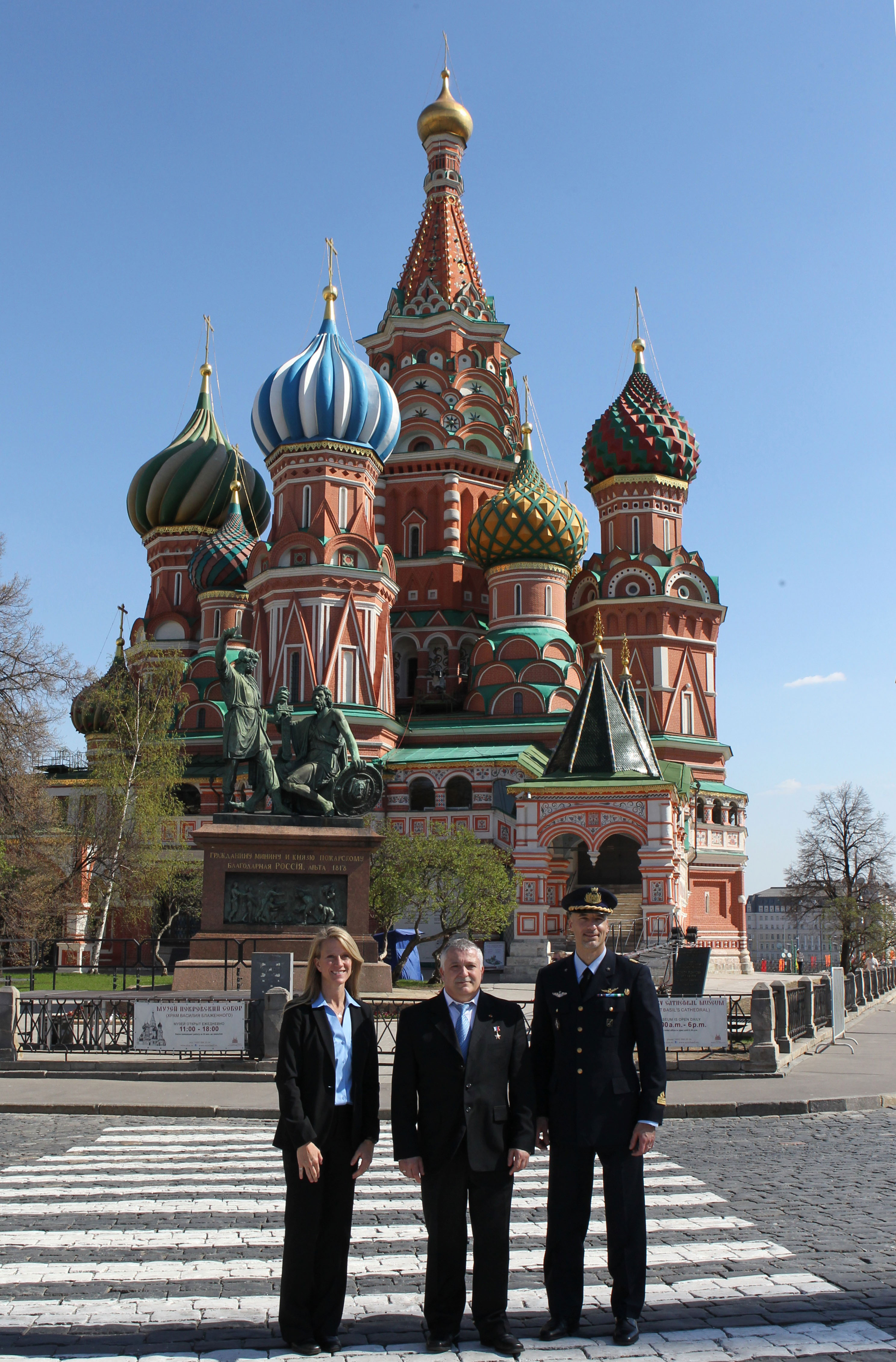
The Soyuz TMA-09M crew members conduct their ceremonial tour of Red Square on 8 May 2013.

Position	Crew Member
Commander	(Russia) Fyodor Yurchikhin, Roscosmos; Expedition 36; Fourth spaceflight
Flight Engineer 1	(Italy) Luca Parmitano, ESA; Expedition 36; First spaceflight
Flight Engineer 2	(United States) Karen L. Nyberg, NASA; Expedition 36; Second and last spaceflight

=== Backup crew ===
Position	Crew Member
Commander	(Russia) Mikhail Tyurin, Roscosmos
Flight Engineer 1	(United States) Richard Mastracchio, NASA
Flight Engineer 2	(Japan) Koichi Wakata, JAXA

== Launch and docking ==
Soyuz TMA-09M was launched from Site 1/5 at the Baikonur Cosmodrome in Kazakhstan. Launch took place at 20:31:00 UTC on 28 May 2013, with a Soyuz-FG carrier rocket propelling the spacecraft into low Earth orbit. The spacecraft separated from the upper stage of the carrier rocket nine minutes after liftoff.

Docking with the ISS, using the nadir port of the Rassvet module, occurred at 02:10 UTC on 29 May, less than six hours after launch as part of a fast rendezvous profile designed to minimise the time the crew must spend in the cramped Soyuz spacecraft.
