= Mike Hopkins (astronaut) =

American astronaut (born 1968)

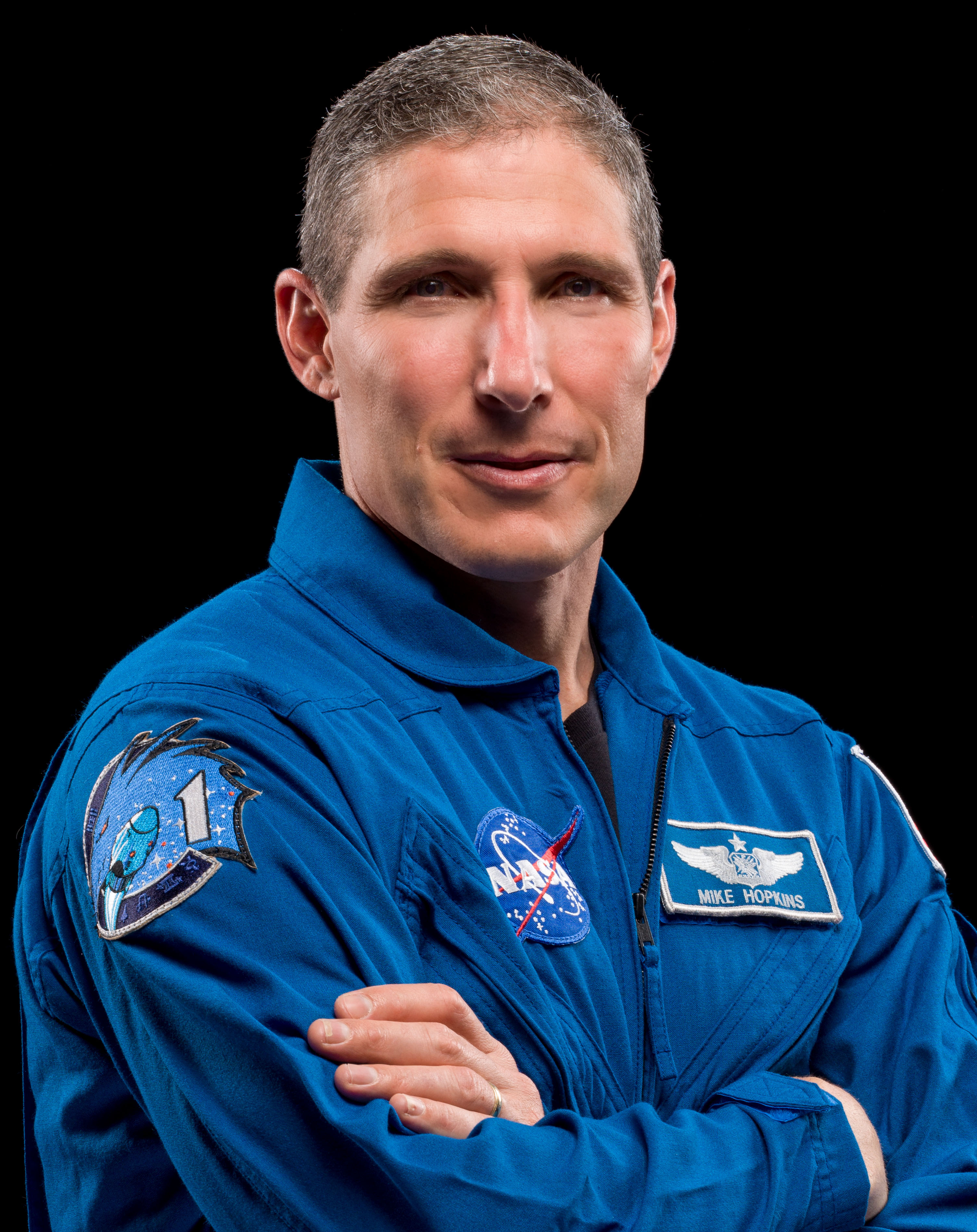
- Official portrait, 2020
- Born: Michael Scott Hopkins; December 28, 1968 (age 57); Lebanon, Missouri, US
- Education: University of Illinois, Urbana-Champaign (BS); Stanford University (MS)
- Space career

NASA astronaut
- Rank: Colonel, USSF
- Time in space: 333d 12h 54m
- Selection: NASA Group 20 (2009)
- Total EVAs: 5
- Total EVA time: 32h 1m
- Missions: Soyuz TMA-10M (Expedition 37/38); SpaceX Crew-1 (Expedition 64/65)
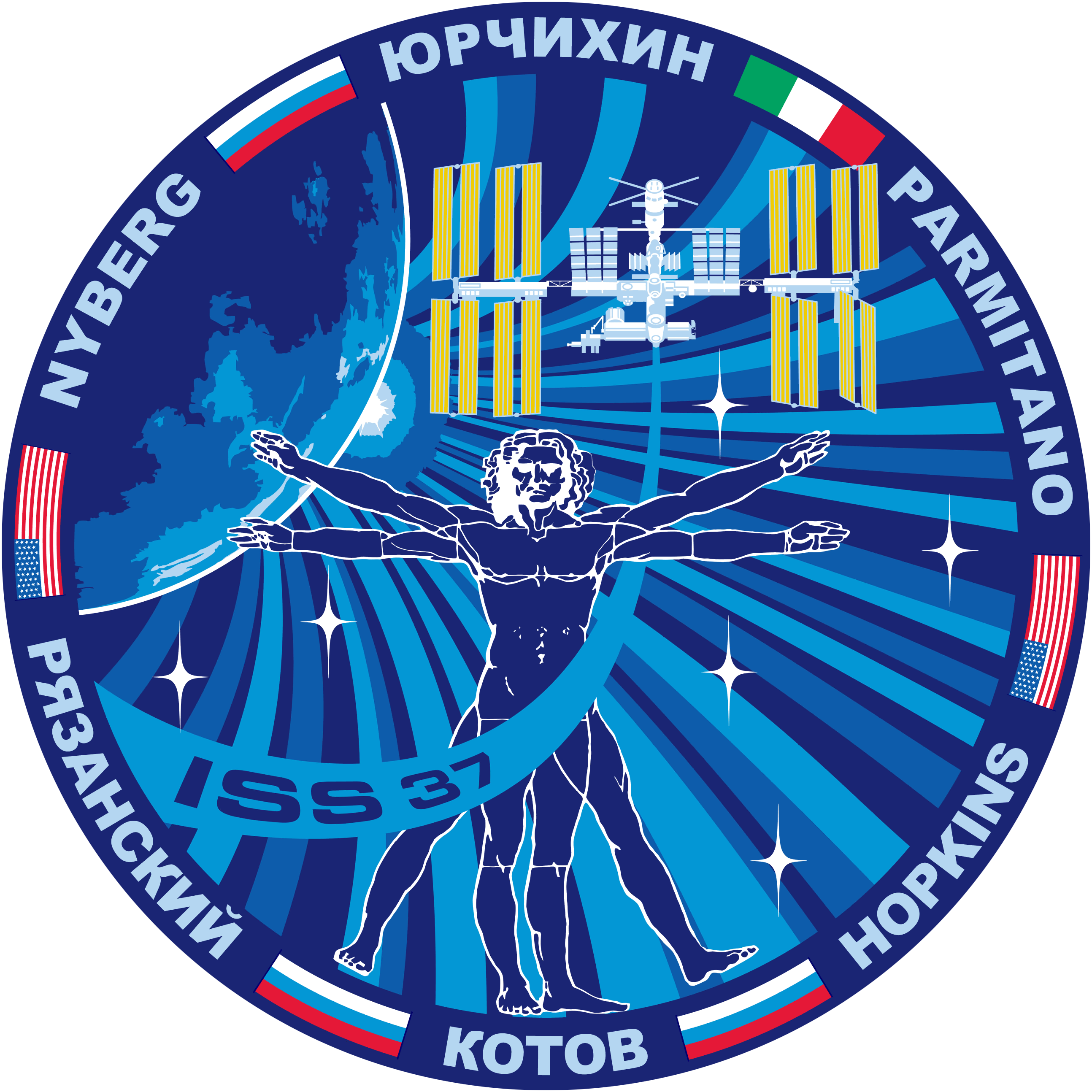
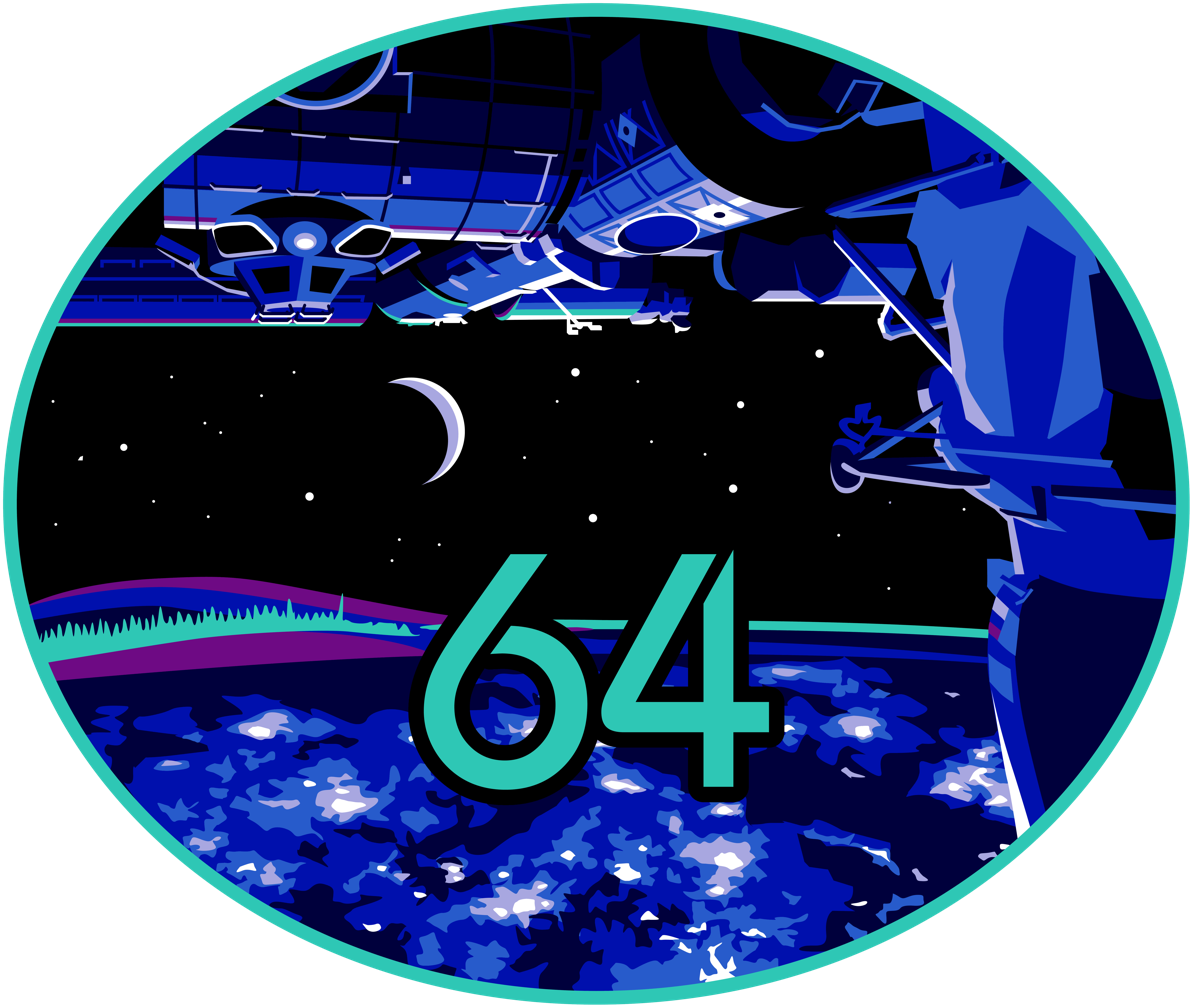
- Mission insignia
- Retired: May 1, 2023

Michael Scott Hopkins (born December 28, 1968) is a United States Space Force colonel and a retired NASA astronaut. Hopkins was selected in June 2009 as a member of the NASA Astronaut Group 20. He made his first spaceflight as a flight engineer on Soyuz TMA-10M for Expedition 37/38 from September 2013 until March 2014. He is the first member of his astronaut class to fly in space. Hopkins is the first astronaut to transfer to the U.S. Space Force, participating in a transfer ceremony on the International Space Station. Prior to his transfer, he served over 27 years in the United States Air Force.

== Biography ==
=== Early life and education ===
Michael Scott Hopkins was born on December 28, 1968, in Lebanon, Missouri and grew up on a farm in Richland, Missouri in a United Methodist family. After graduating from the School of the Osage High School in Lake of the Ozarks, Missouri, in 1987, he entered the University of Illinois at Urbana-Champaign. While there, he played defensive back for the Illinois Fighting Illini football team and was awarded the Big Ten Medal of Honor, which recognizes one male and one female student from the graduating class of each Big Ten member school, for demonstrating joint athletic and academic excellence throughout their college career. He graduated in 1991 with a Bachelor of Science degree in aerospace engineering from University of Illinois Urbana-Champaign. He followed his undergraduate studies with a Master of Science degree in aerospace engineering from Stanford University, which he earned in 1992.

=== Military career ===
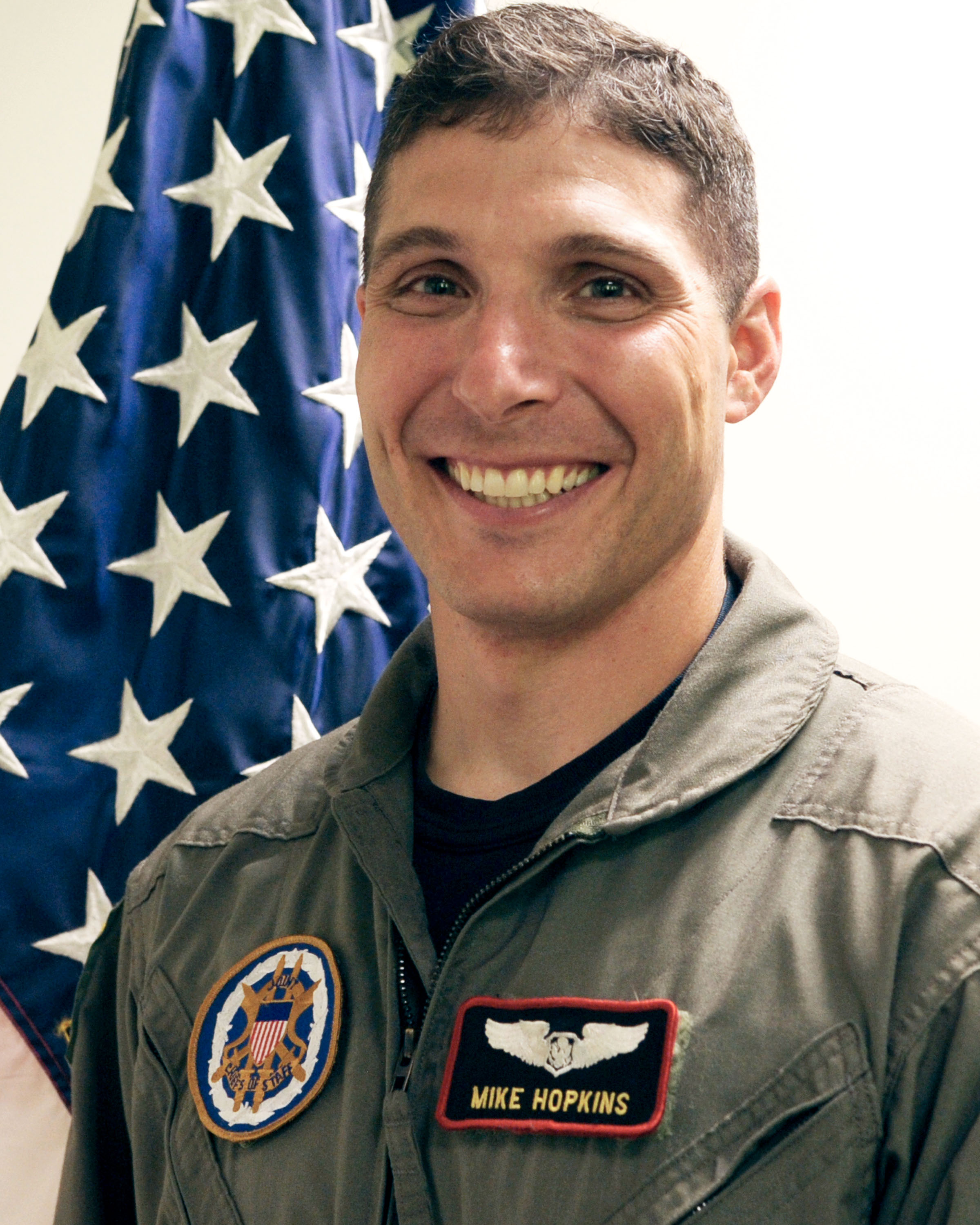
Mike Hopkins in flight suit while serving as special assistant to the Vice Chairman of the Joint Chiefs of Staff

Hopkins received his commission in the United States Air Force via the Air Force ROTC from the University of Illinois, where he was a distinguished graduate. After graduating with his bachelor's degree, he was commissioned a second lieutenant in January 1992. Early in his Air Force career, he was stationed at Kirtland Air Force Base in Albuquerque, New Mexico working on advanced space system technologies. In 1996, he attended the U.S. Air Force Test Pilot School as a flight test engineer. He graduated in class 96B as a Distinguished graduate and top flight test engineer. Following Test Pilot School he was assigned to the 418th Flight Test Squadron testing the C-17 and C-130 aircraft. In 1999, he was sent to Canada on an exchange program. While there he lived in Cold Lake, Alberta working with the Canadian Flight Test Center. In 2002, he was selected as an Olmsted Scholar by the George and Carol Olmsted Foundation and was sent to the Defense Language Institute in Monterey, California studying foreign language. After six months of language training, he was sent to Parma, Italy studying political science at the Università degli Studi di Parma. In 2005, Hopkins was assigned to the U.S. Air Force Rapid Capabilities Project Office at the Pentagon where he was a project engineer and program manager. Following this assignment, in 2008 he was assigned as a special assistant to the vice chairman of the Joint Chiefs of Staff, General James Cartwright. He was working with the Joint Chiefs when he was assigned to be an astronaut candidate.

== NASA career ==
In 2009, Hopkins was one of nine astronauts selected by NASA as part of NASA Astronaut Group 20. He began training alongside his Group mates and five international mission specialists later that year at the Johnson Space Center. He completed his training in November 2011 after two years of scientific and technical briefings, intensive instruction in International Space Station systems, spacewalks, robotics, physiological training, T-38 flight training, and water and wilderness survival training.

Following the completion of his astronaut training, Hopkins became available to work other jobs in the NASA Astronaut Office, as well as being eligible for a future flight assignment.

=== Expedition 37/38 ===
In February 2011, Hopkins was assigned to the crew of ISS Expedition 37/38, becoming the first member of his astronaut class to be given a flight assignment. He began training alongside Russian cosmonauts Oleg Kotov and Sergey Ryazansky for a long-duration flight to the Space Station.

On September 25, 2013, Hopkins, Kotov, and Ryazansky launched on board the Soyuz TMA-10M spacecraft. The trio docked with the International Space Station several hours later, joining the Expedition 37 crew, which included Roscosmos cosmonaut Fyodor Yurchikhin, NASA astronaut Karen Nyberg, and ESA astronaut Luca Parmitano. Shortly before their arrival aboard the station, the existing crew had welcomed the Orbital Sciences Corporation Orb-D1 mission, the first demonstration flight of Orbital's Cygnus unmanned resupply spacecraft, flying under the Commercial Resupply Services contract.

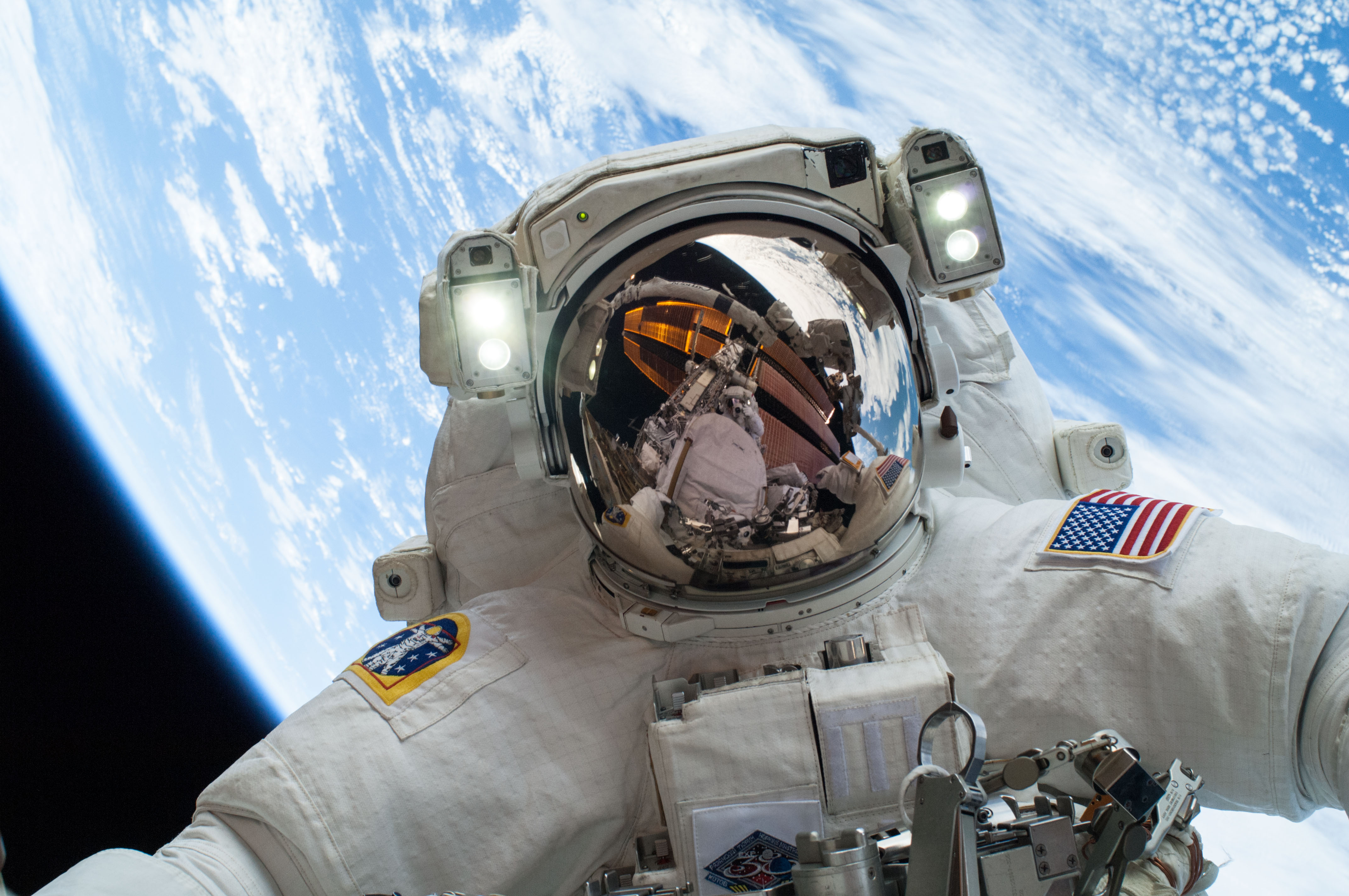
Hopkins during an EVA with Rick Mastracchio

Following the departure of Soyuz TMA-09M, carrying Yurchikin, Nyberg, and Parmitano, Hopkins and his two crewmates joined the Expedition 38 crew, with Kotov taking over as Station commander. Just prior to the departure of Soyuz TMA-09M, they had been joined by the remaining three Expedition 38 crew members: Roscosmos cosmonaut Mikhail Tyurin; NASA astronaut Rick Mastracchio; and JAXA astronaut Koichi Wakata, who had arrived aboard Soyuz TMA-11M. This unusual "direct handover" was in order to allow the crew of Soyuz TMA-11M to bring up an Olympic torch, to be returned by the crew of Soyuz TMA-09M days later as part of the Olympic Torch Relay for the 2014 Winter Olympics in Sochi, Russia.

During Expedition 38, Hopkins participated in two spacewalks, alongside Mastracchio, lasting 5 hours and 28 minutes and 7 hours and 30 minutes, respectively. During the spacewalks, Mastracchio and Hopkins performed maintenance and upgrades on the exterior of the station. Also during ISS-38, Hopkins was aboard the station for the berthing and release of Cygnus CRS Orb-1, the first operational flight of the Cygnus spacecraft.

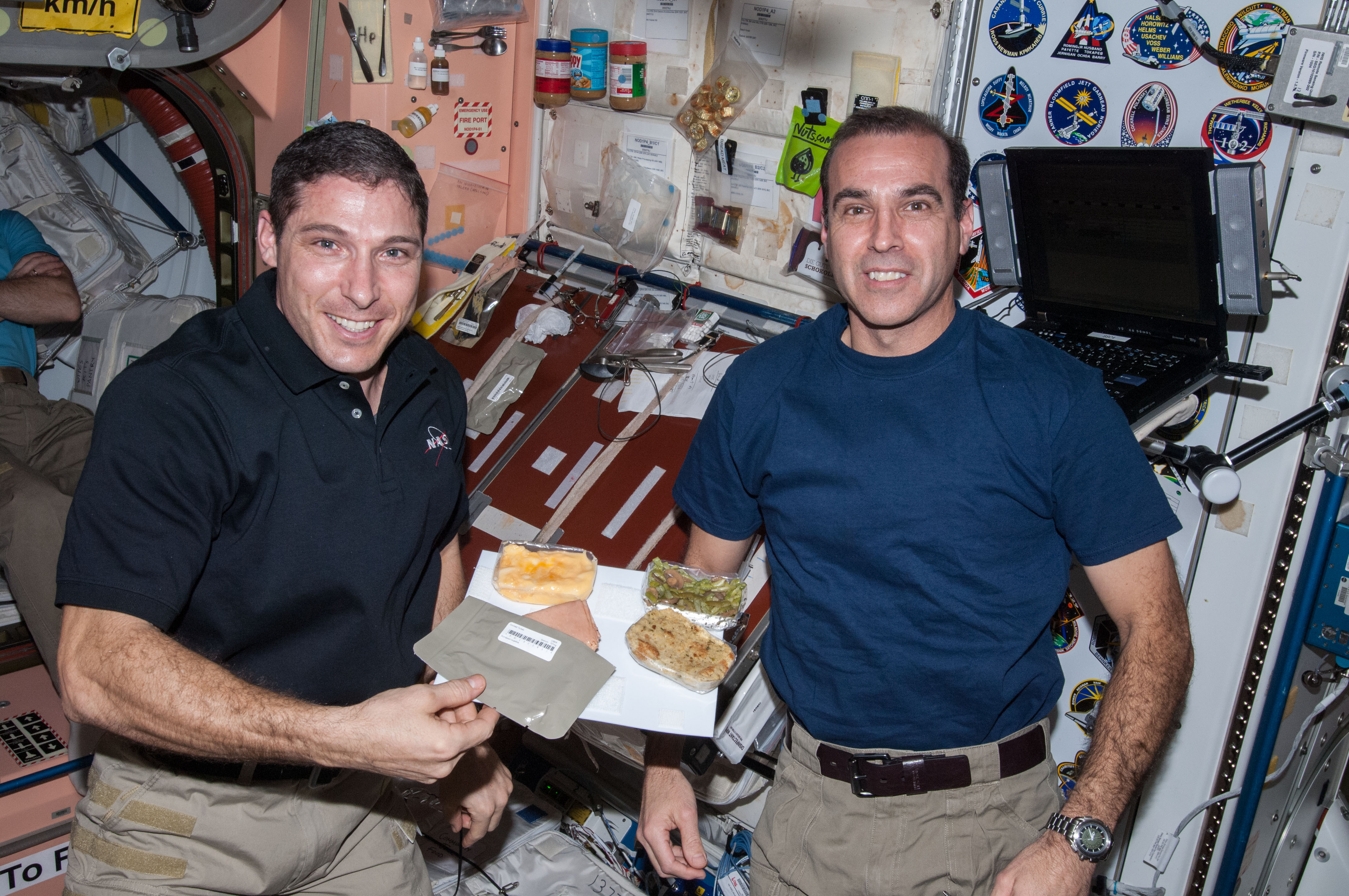
Hopkins (left) with Rick Mastracchio during a Thanksgiving meal on the ISS

Hopkins and his two crewmates departed the station aboard Soyuz TMA-10M on March 10, 2014, leaving Tyrin, Masstrachio, and Wakata aboard the station as the initial crew of Expedition 39. The trio landed in Kazakhstan less than five hours later, ending a 166-day spaceflight.

=== Expedition 64/65 ===
In August 2018, Hopkins and Victor Glover were assigned to fly on SpaceX Crew-1, the first operational mission to the International Space Station of the SpaceX Crew Dragon as part of NASA's Commercial Crew Program. The two were later joined by NASA astronaut Shannon Walker and JAXA astronaut Soichi Noguchi in March 2020.

On November 15, 2020, Hopkins, Glover, Walker, and Noguchi launched on Crew Dragon Resilience, arriving at the Station two days later, on November 17.

On December 18, 2020, Hopkins became the first astronaut to transfer from the Air Force to the Space Force in a ceremony on the International Space Station.

On January 27, 2021, Hopkins' third spacewalk was a team effort with Victor Glover, lasting for nearly seven hours as they worked to upgrade the Columbus module. It was Glover's first spacewalk ever.

On February 1, 2021, on the second spacewalk of the mission, and his fourth spacewalk overall, also with Glover, Hopkins replaced a broken external camera, upgraded two other cameras, and concluded a four-year campaign initiated by Shane Kimbrough and Peggy Whitson on Expedition 50 to replace the station's batteries.

Crew-1 splashed down in the Gulf of Mexico on May 2, 2021 after 167 days in space.

=== Retirement ===
In June 2023, NASA announced that Hopkins had retired. In September 2024, Hopkins appeared as a commentator during SpaceX's live coverage of the Polaris Dawn spacewalk.

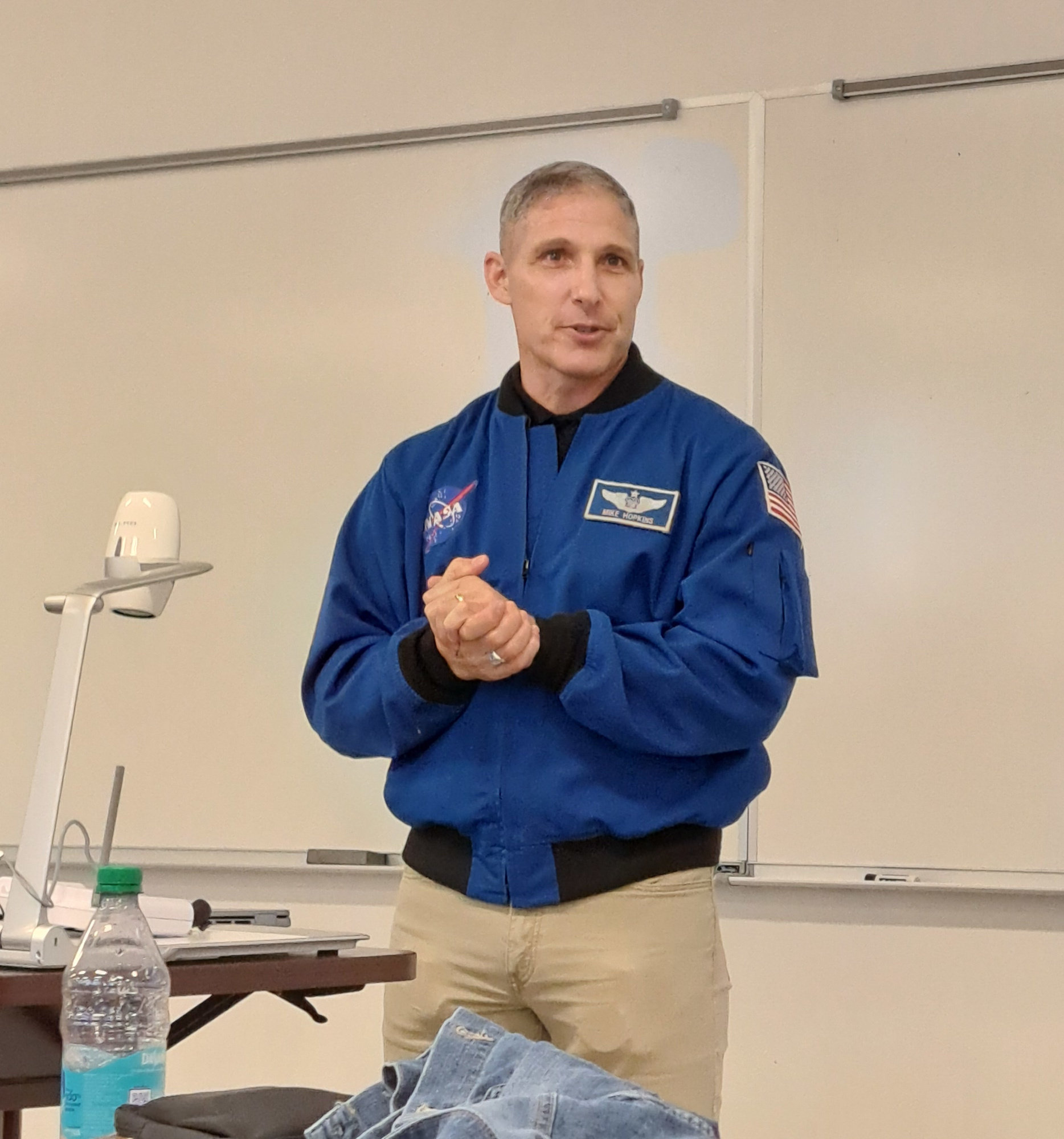
Astronaut Michael S. Hopkins giving a talk at the University of Illinois in 2025

== Personal life ==
Hopkins is married to Julie Hopkins (née Stutz) and has two sons. In 2013, Hopkins, formerly a communicant in the Methodist Church, was received into the Catholic Church, joining his wife and his children who are Catholics. On his first mission to the ISS, his pastor arranged for him to bring the Eucharist, so that he could have Communion once a week.

== Awards and decorations ==
Defense Meritorious Service Medal
Meritorious Service Medal
Aerial Achievement Medal
Air Force Commendation Medal with bronze oak leaf cluster
Air Force Achievement Medal with two bronze oak leaf clusters
National Defense Service Medal with bronze service star
Air Force Training Ribbon
