= Richard Mastracchio =

American astronaut and engineer (born 1960)

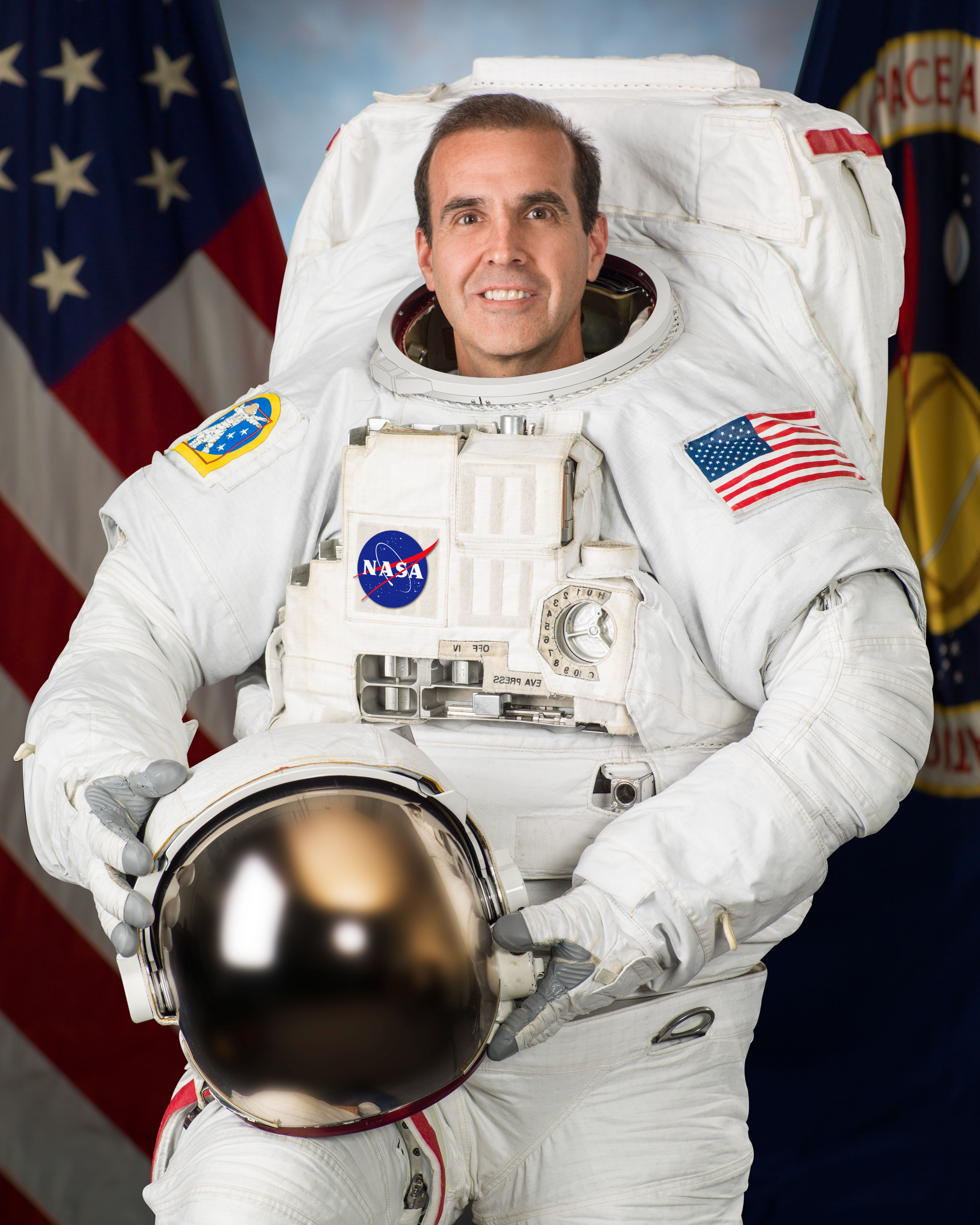
- Born: Richard Alan Mastracchio; February 11, 1960 (age 66); Waterbury, Connecticut, U.S.
- Education: University of Connecticut (BS); Rensselaer Polytechnic Institute (MS); University of Houston (MS)
- Space career

NASA astronaut
- Time in space: 227d 13h 38m
- Selection: NASA Group 16 (1996)
- Total EVAs: 9
- Total EVA time: 53h 4m
- Missions: STS-106; STS-118; STS-131; Soyuz TMA-11M (Expedition 38/39)
- Mission insignia

Richard Alan Mastracchio (born February 11, 1960) is an American engineer and former NASA astronaut. He has flown on three NASA Space Shuttle missions as a mission specialist in addition to serving as a flight engineer on the Soyuz TMA-11M (Expedition 38/Expedition 39) long-duration mission aboard the International Space Station. He is currently the senior director of operations for commercial resupply services at Orbital ATK.

== Personal ==
Richard Mastracchio was born in Waterbury, Connecticut and graduated from Crosby High School in 1978. He received a Bachelor of Science degree in electrical engineering and computer science from the University of Connecticut in 1982, a Master of Science degree in electrical engineering from Rensselaer Polytechnic Institute in 1987, and a Master of Science degree in physical science from the University of Houston–Clear Lake in 1991.

He is a member of the Institute of Electrical and Electronics Engineers.

He is married to Candi Mastracchio.

== Engineering career ==
Mastracchio worked for Hamilton Standard in Connecticut as an engineer in the system design group from 1982 until 1987. During that time, he participated in the development of high performance, inertial measurement units and flight control computers.

== NASA career ==
In 1987, Mastracchio moved to Houston, Texas, to work for the Rockwell Shuttle Operations Company at the Johnson Space Center. In 1990, he joined NASA as an engineer in the Flight Crew Operations Directorate. His duties included the development of space shuttle flight software requirements, the verification of space shuttle flight software in the Shuttle Avionics Integration Laboratory, and the development of ascent and abort crew procedures for the Astronaut Office.

From 1993 until 1996, he worked as an ascent/entry Guidance and Procedures Officer (GPO) in Mission Control. An ascent/entry GPO has both pre-mission and real time Space Shuttle support responsibilities in the areas of onboard guidance, navigation, and targeting. During that time, he supported seventeen missions as a flight controller.

In April 1996, Mastracchio was selected as an astronaut candidate and started training in August 1996. Having completed two years of training and evaluation, he is qualified for flight assignment as a mission specialist. Mastracchio has worked technical issues for the Astronaut Office Computer Support Branch, for Space Station Operations, and the EVA Branch. He next served as lead for cockpit avionics upgrades.

Mastracchio flew as a mission specialist on STS-106. His next mission was STS-118 in August 2007, followed by STS-131 in April 2010. He has logged over 5,461 hours in space.

Mastracchio was a flight engineer on Expedition 38/39 aboard the International Space Station and was one of the astronauts repairing the malfunctioning main cooling system during the mission. He returned to Earth on May 13, 2014.

He retired from NASA in June 2017.

=== STS-106 ===
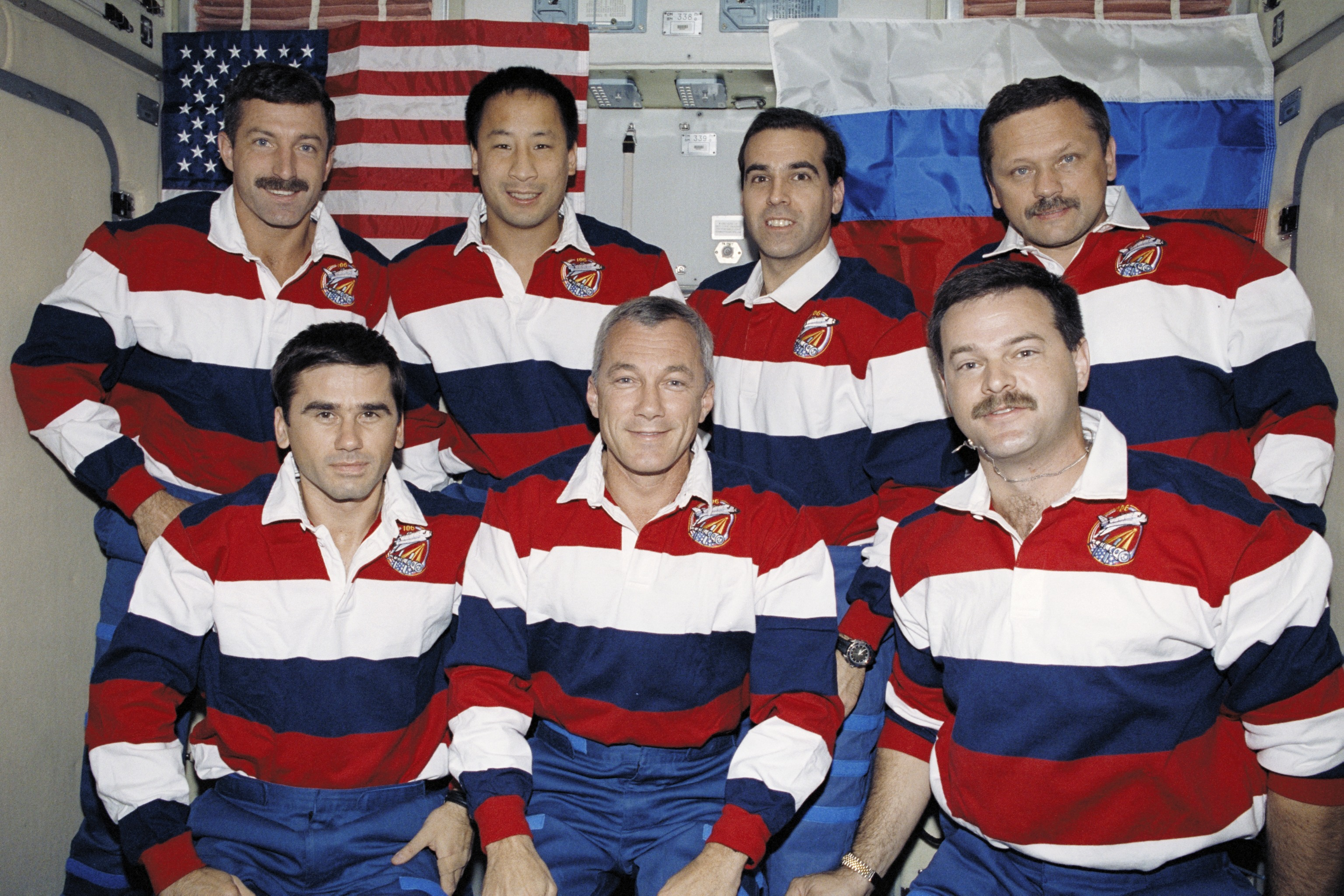
The STS-106 crew on the ISS. Mastracchio is pictured on the top row, second right

Atlantis (September 8–20, 2000). During the 12-day mission, the crew prepared the International Space Station for the arrival of the first permanent crew. The five astronauts and two cosmonauts delivered more than 6,600 pounds of supplies and installed batteries, power converters, a toilet and a treadmill. Two crewmembers performed a spacewalk to connect power, data and communications cables between the newly arrived Zvezda Service Module and the other station modules. Mastracchio was the ascent/entry flight engineer, the primary robotic arm operator, and responsible for the transfer of items from the Space Shuttle to the Space Station. STS-106 orbited the Earth 185 times, and covered 4.9 million miles in 11 days, 19 hours, and 10 minutes.

=== STS-118 ===
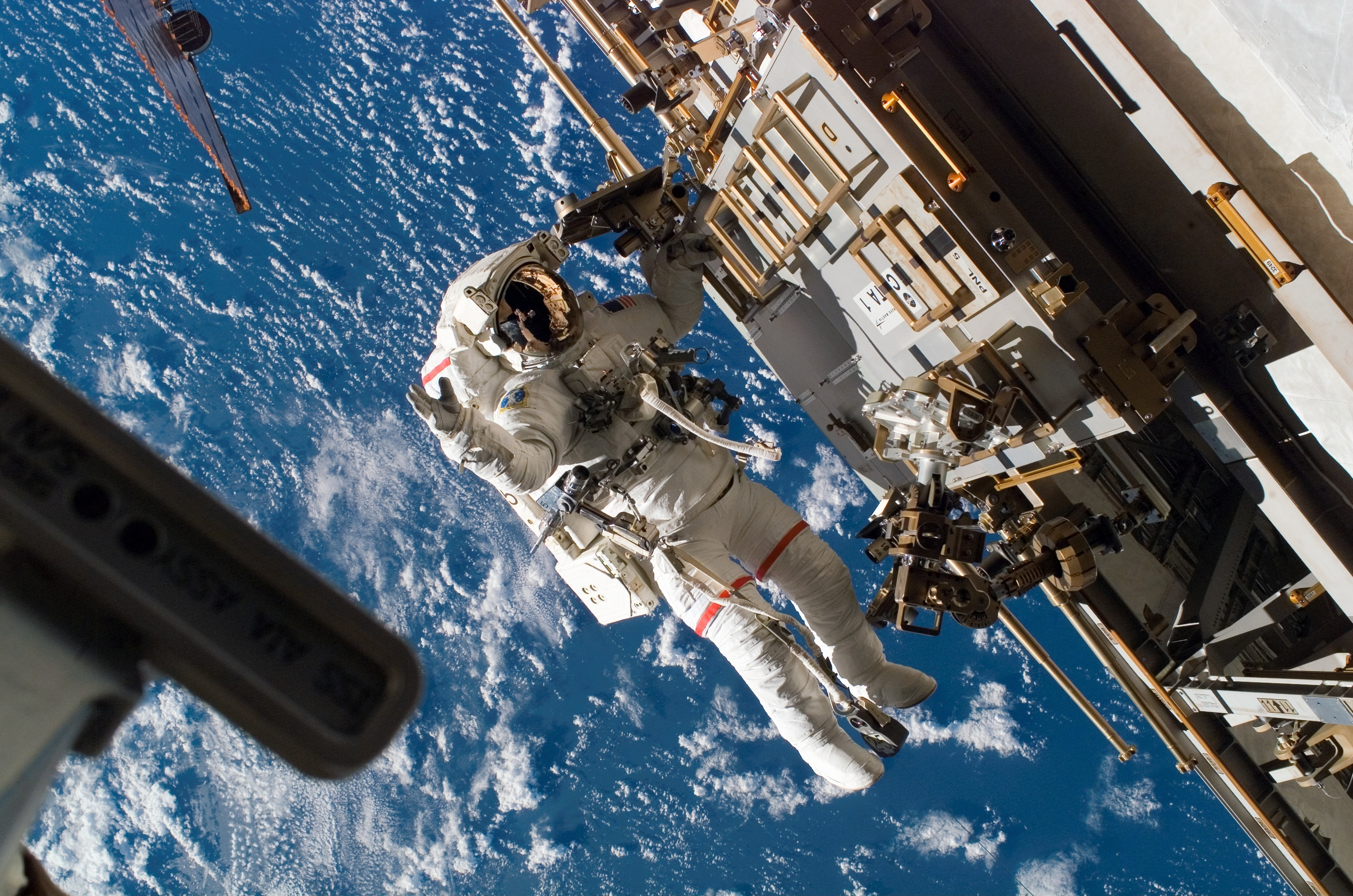
Mastracchio rides the CETA Cart on the STS-118 mission.

Endeavour (August 8–21, 2007) was the 119th space shuttle flight, the 22nd flight to the station, and the 20th flight for Endeavour. During the mission Endeavour's crew successfully added another truss segment, a new gyroscope and external spare parts platform to the International Space Station. Mastracchio was the ascent/entry flight engineer and participated in three of the four spacewalks. Traveling 5.3 million miles in space, the STS-118 mission was completed in 12 days, 17 hours, 55 minutes and 34 seconds.

=== STS-131 ===
Discovery (April 5–20, 2010), a resupply mission to the International Space Station, was launched at night from the Kennedy Space Center.

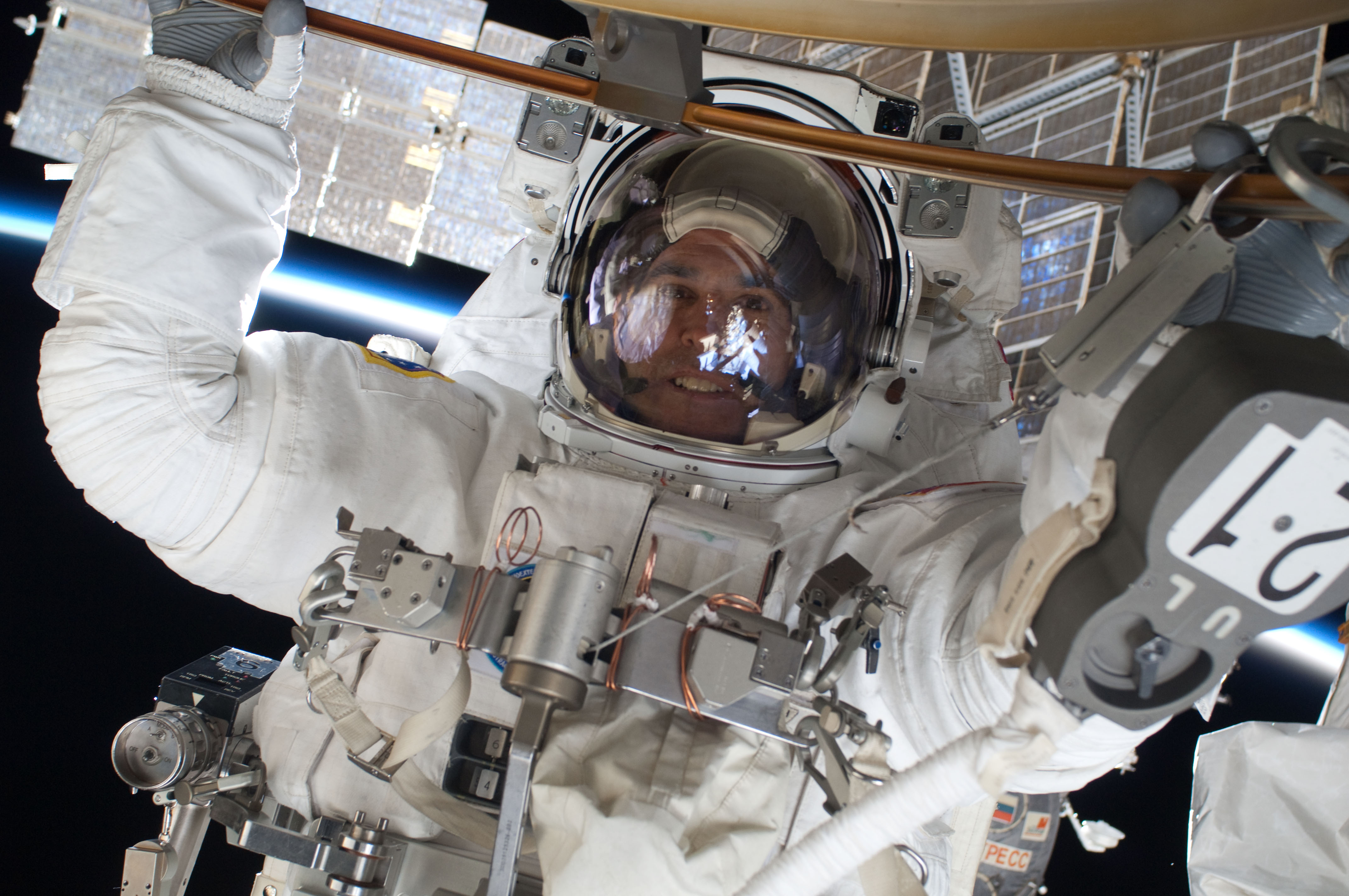
Mastracchio pictured during an EVA with Clayton Anderson as part of STS-131

On arrival at the station, Discovery's crew dropped off more than 27,000 pounds of hardware, supplies and equipment, including a tank full of ammonia coolant, new crew sleeping quarters, and three experiment racks. As the EVA lead, Mastracchio performed three spacewalks during this mission and logged 20 hours and 17 minutes of extravehicular activity. On the return journey, the Leonardo Multi-Purpose Logistics Module inside Discovery's payload bay was packed with over 6,000 pounds of hardware, science results, and trash. The STS-131 mission was accomplished in 15 days, 02 hours, 47 minutes, 10 seconds, and traveled 6,232,235 statute miles in 238 orbits. Mastracchio launched on Expedition 38/39 from the Baikonur Cosmodrome in Kazakhstan to the International Space Station along with Soyuz Commander Mikhail Tyurin of the Russian Federal Space Agency (Roscosmos) and Japan Aerospace Exploration Agency (JAXA) Flight Engineer Koichi Wakata. During his stay aboard the space station, Mastracchio conducted three spacewalks, the first two to remove and replace a faulty cooling pump, and the third to remove and replace a failed backup computer relay box. Mastracchio, Tyurin and Wakata returned to Earth after 188 days in space. During the expedition, the crew completed 3,008 orbits of the Earth and traveled more than 79.8 million miles.

=== Expedition 38/39 ===
Mastracchio launched for his fourth space flight onboard Soyuz TMA-11M alongside veteran Russian cosmonaut Mikhail Tyurin and JAXA's Koichi Wakata, with additional focus on the launch due to a publicity stunt related to the 2014 Winter Olympics, due to be held in Sochi.

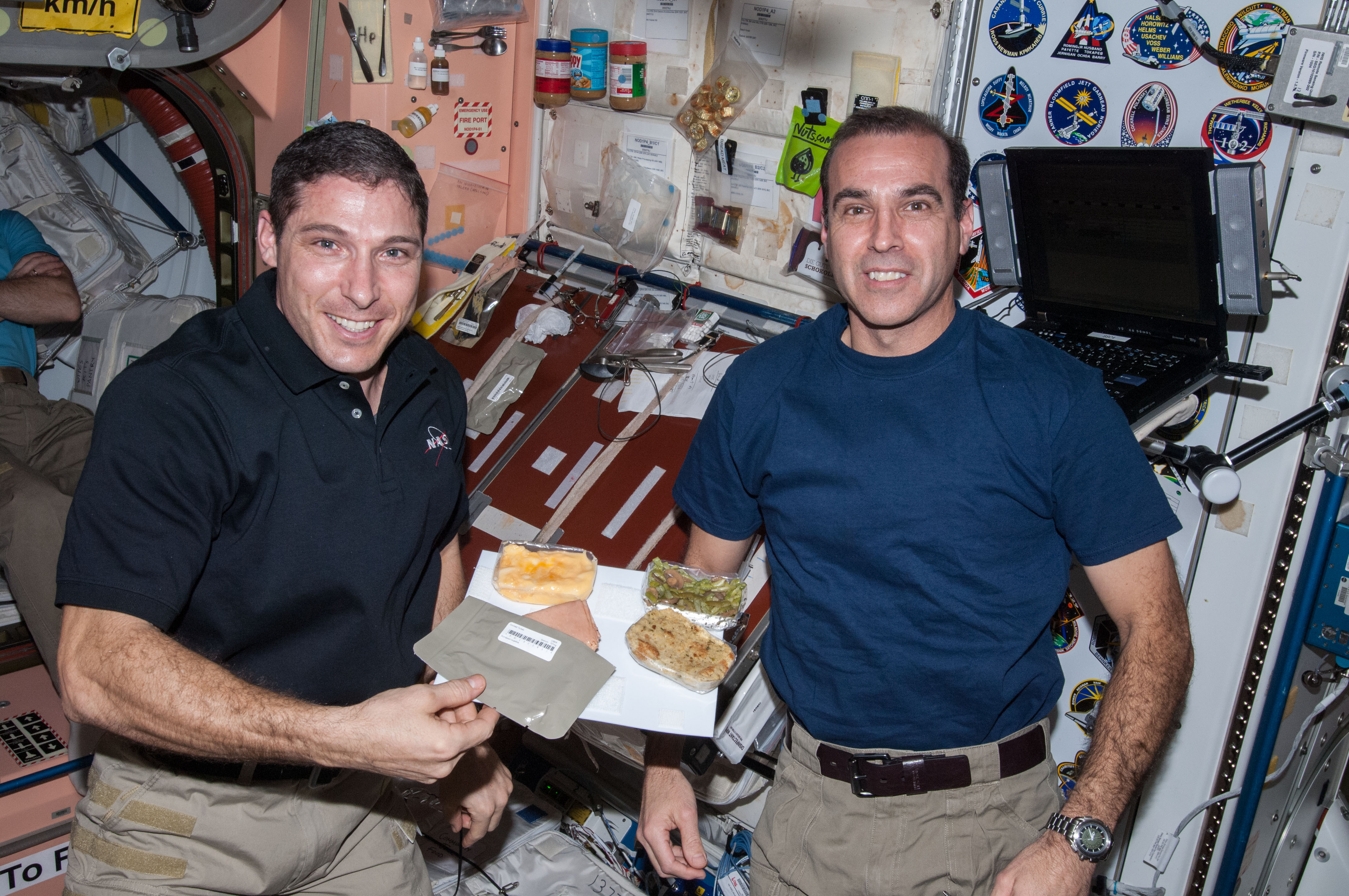
Mastracchio (right) pictured with Mike Hopkins in the Unity node of the ISS

The Soyuz followed the new rendezvous profile, and the crew docked with the ISS approximately 6 hours after launching from the Baikonur Cosmodrome.

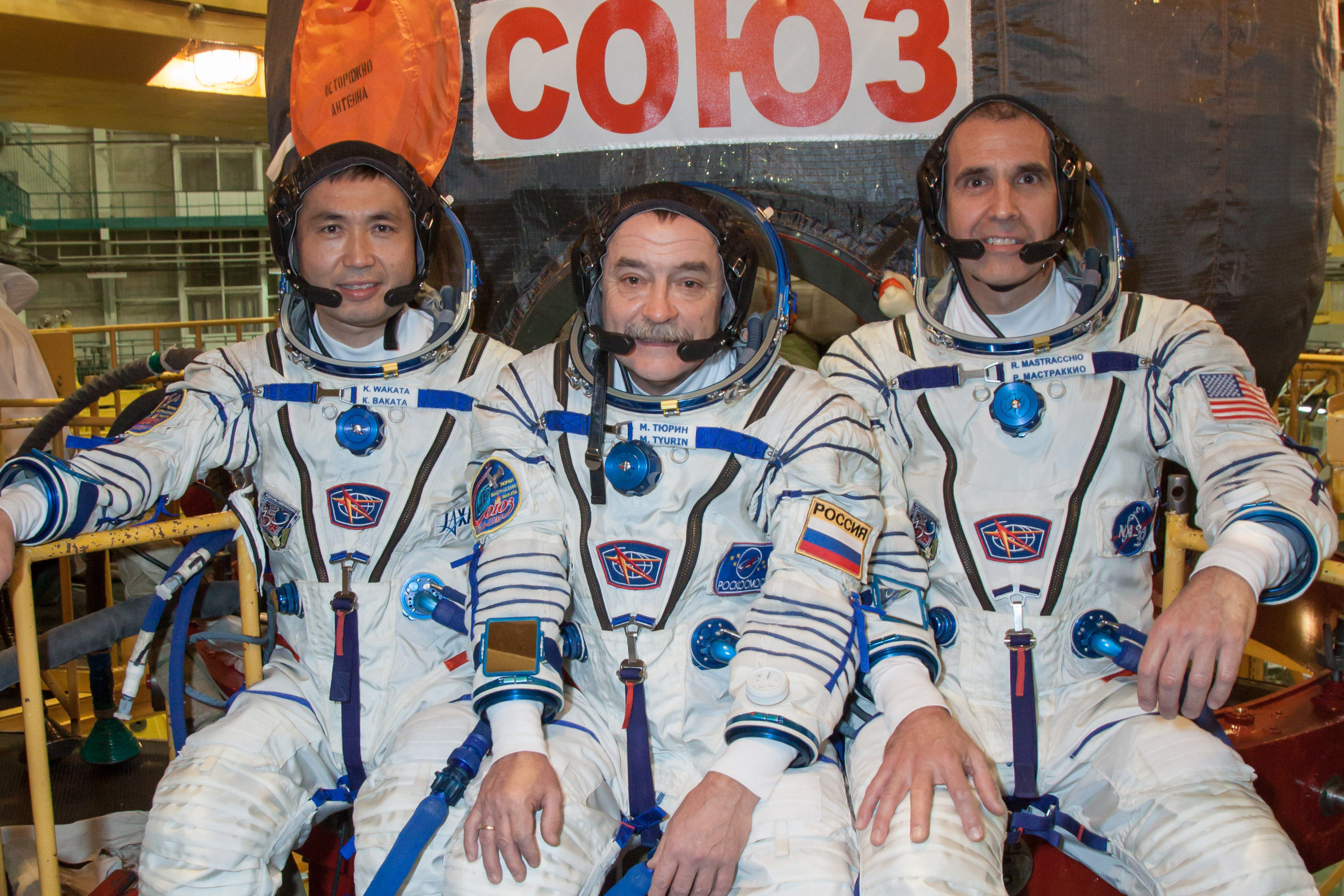
Mastracchio (right) pictured next to the Soyuz rocket

Mastracchio performed 3 EVAs during the mission, 2 with Michael S. Hopkins, and his final career EVA with Steven Swanson, whereby they replaced a backup multiplexer-demultiplexer (MDM) that failed during routine testing April 11, 2014. They duration of the EVA was 1 hour and 36 minutes.

Mastracchio, Tyurin and Wakata returned to Earth on May 14, 2014, after spending nearly 188 days in space.

== Post-NASA career ==
On June 19, 2017, Mastracchio was appointed Senior Director of Operations for Commercial Resupply Services at Orbital ATK. He is currently Director Of Business Development at Northrop Grumman Space Systems.
