= Wakata =

Wakata may refer to:

== People ==
- Koichi Wakata (born 1963) Japanese engineer and an astronaut

== Other ==
- 6208 Wakata a minor planet
