= Expedition 39 =

Long-duration mission to the International Space Station

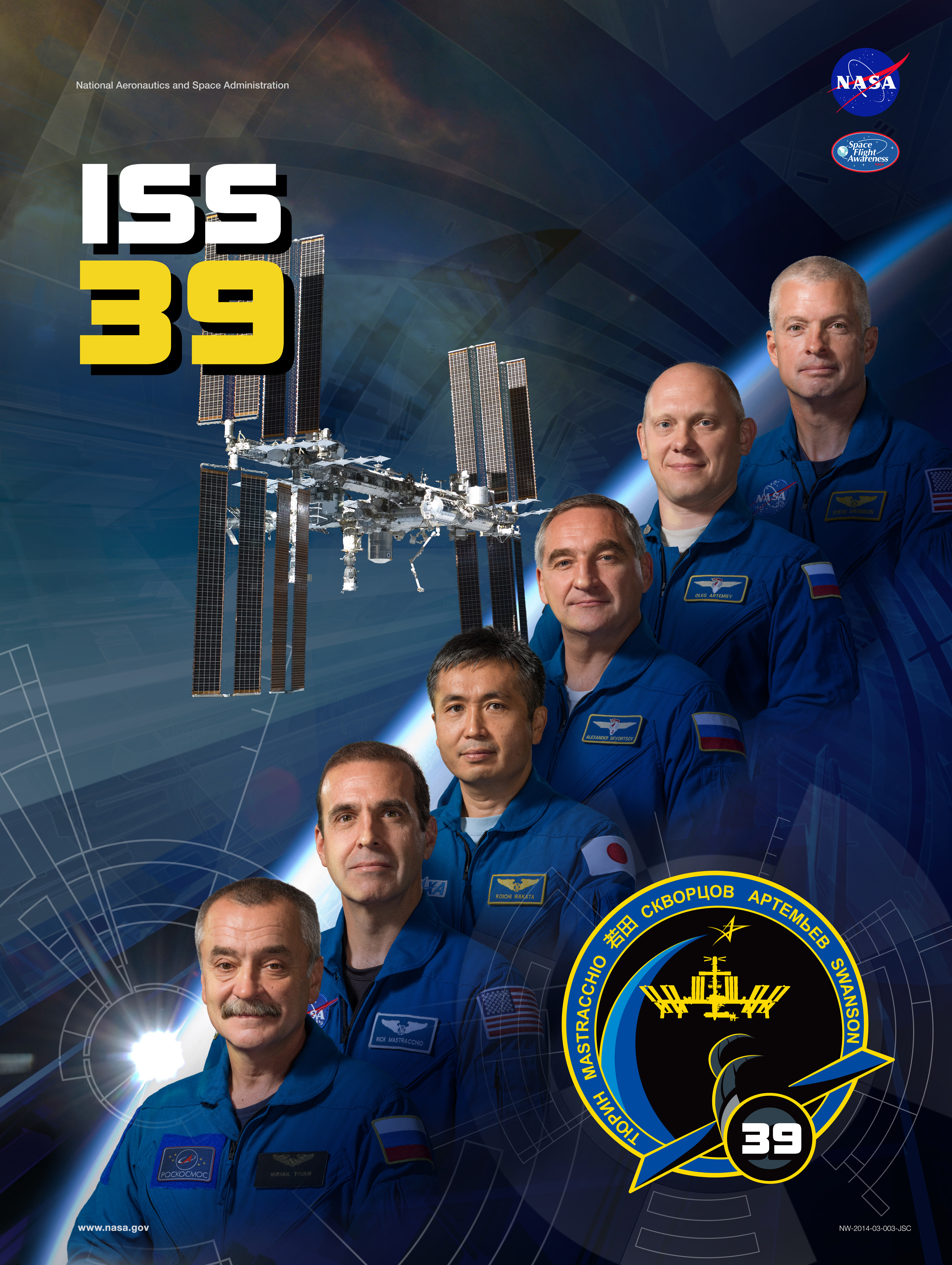
- Promotional Poster
- Mission type: Long-duration expedition

Expedition
- Space station: International Space Station
- Began: 11 March 2014 UTC
- Ended: 13 May 2014 UTC
- Arrived aboard: Soyuz TMA-11M; Soyuz TMA-12M
- Departed aboard: Soyuz TMA-11M; Soyuz TMA-12M

Crew
- Crew size: 6
- Members: Expedition 38/39: Koichi Wakata; Richard A. Mastracchio; Mikhail Tyurin Expedition 39/40: Aleksandr Skvortsov; Oleg Artemyev; Steven R. Swanson
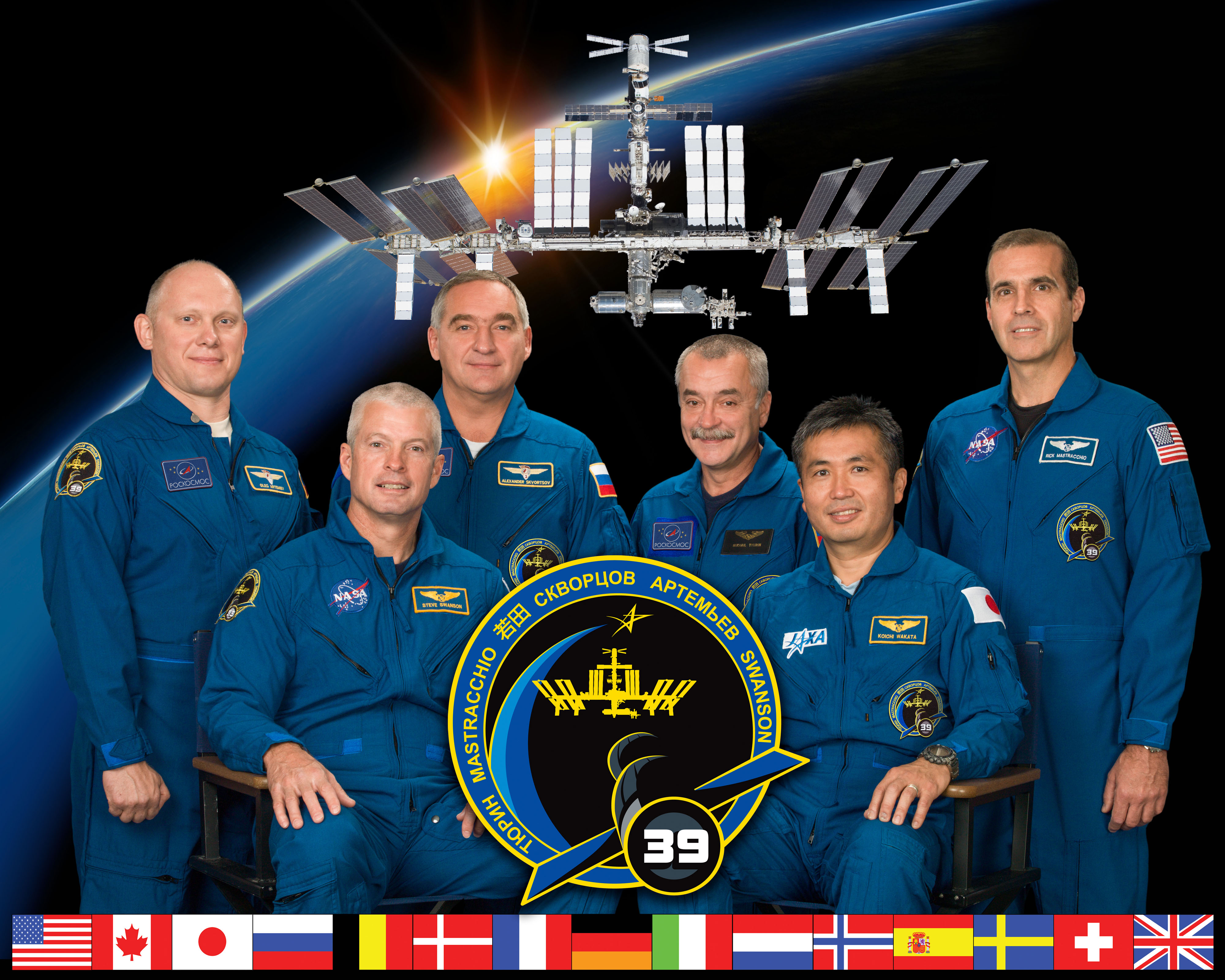
- Expedition 39 mission patch (l-r) Artemyev, Swanson, Skvortsov, Tyurin, Wakata and Mastracchio ISS expeditions

Expedition 39 was the 39th expedition to the International Space Station. It marked the first time the ISS had been under command of a Japanese astronaut, space veteran Koichi Wakata. After Expedition 21 in 2009 and Expedition 35 in 2013, it was only the third time an ISS crew was led by neither a NASA nor an RSA crew member.

During Expedition 39, Astronauts Mastracchio and Swanson installed the "Veggie" project on the International Space Station.

== Crew ==
Position	First Part (March 2014)	Second Part (March 2014 to May 2014)
Commander	Koichi Wakata, JAXA; Fourth spaceflight	
Flight Engineer 1	Richard A. Mastracchio, NASA; Fourth and last spaceflight	
Flight Engineer 2	Mikhail Tyurin, RSA; Third and last spaceflight	
Flight Engineer 3		Aleksandr Skvortsov, RSA; Second spaceflight
Flight Engineer 4		Oleg Artemyev, RSA; First spaceflight
Flight Engineer 5		Steven R. Swanson, NASA; Third and last spaceflight

Source
JAXA, NASA, ESA
