= Expedition 38 =

Long-duration mission to the International Space Station

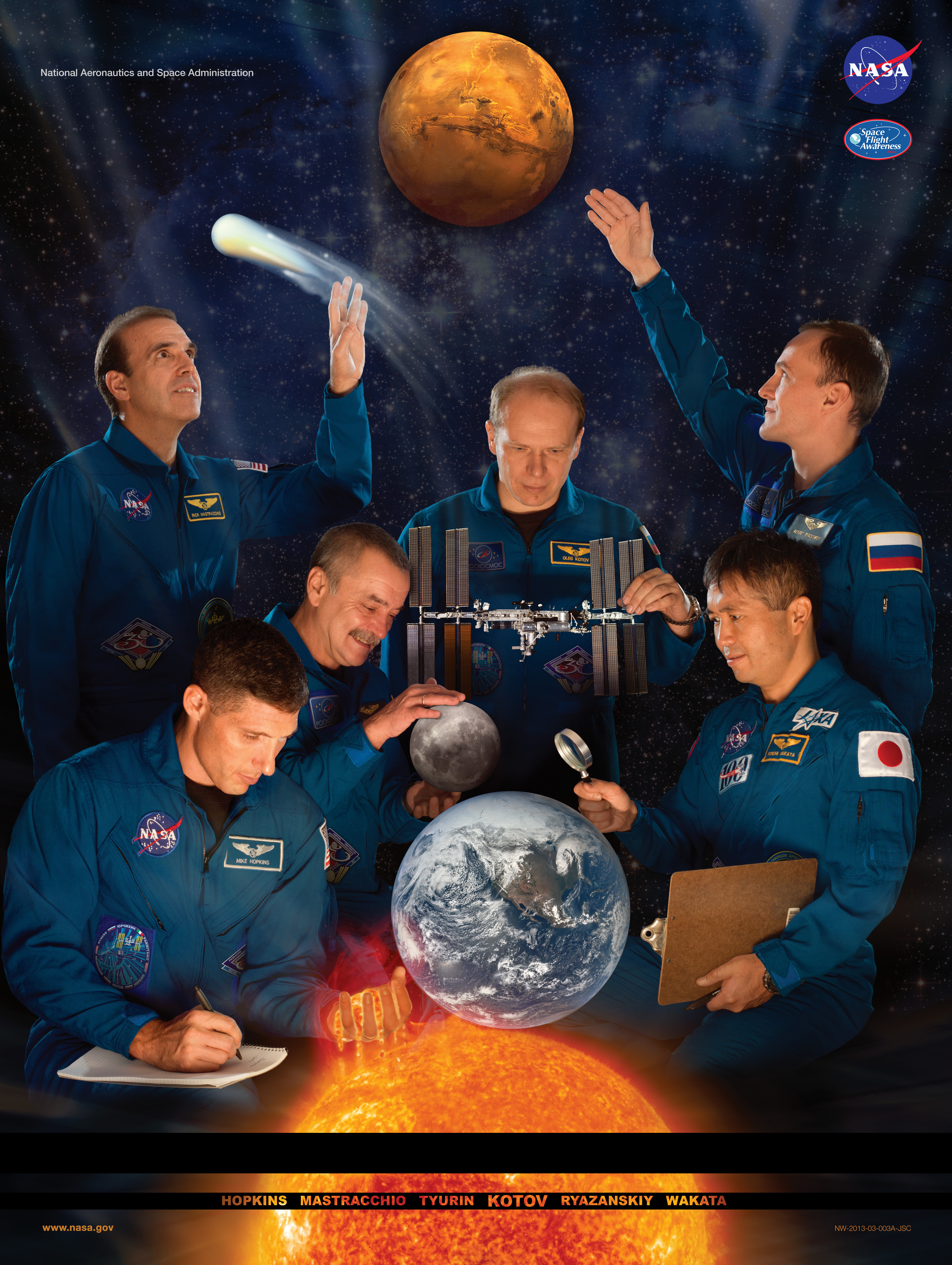
- Promotional Poster
- Mission type: Long-duration expedition

Expedition
- Space station: International Space Station
- Began: 10 November 2013 UTC
- Ended: 11 March 2014 UTC
- Arrived aboard: Soyuz TMA-10M; Soyuz TMA-11M
- Departed aboard: Soyuz TMA-10M; Soyuz TMA-11M

Crew
- Crew size: 6
- Members: Expedition 37/38: Oleg Kotov; Sergey Ryazansky; Michael S. Hopkins Expedition 38/39: Koichi Wakata; Richard A. Mastracchio; Mikhail Tyurin
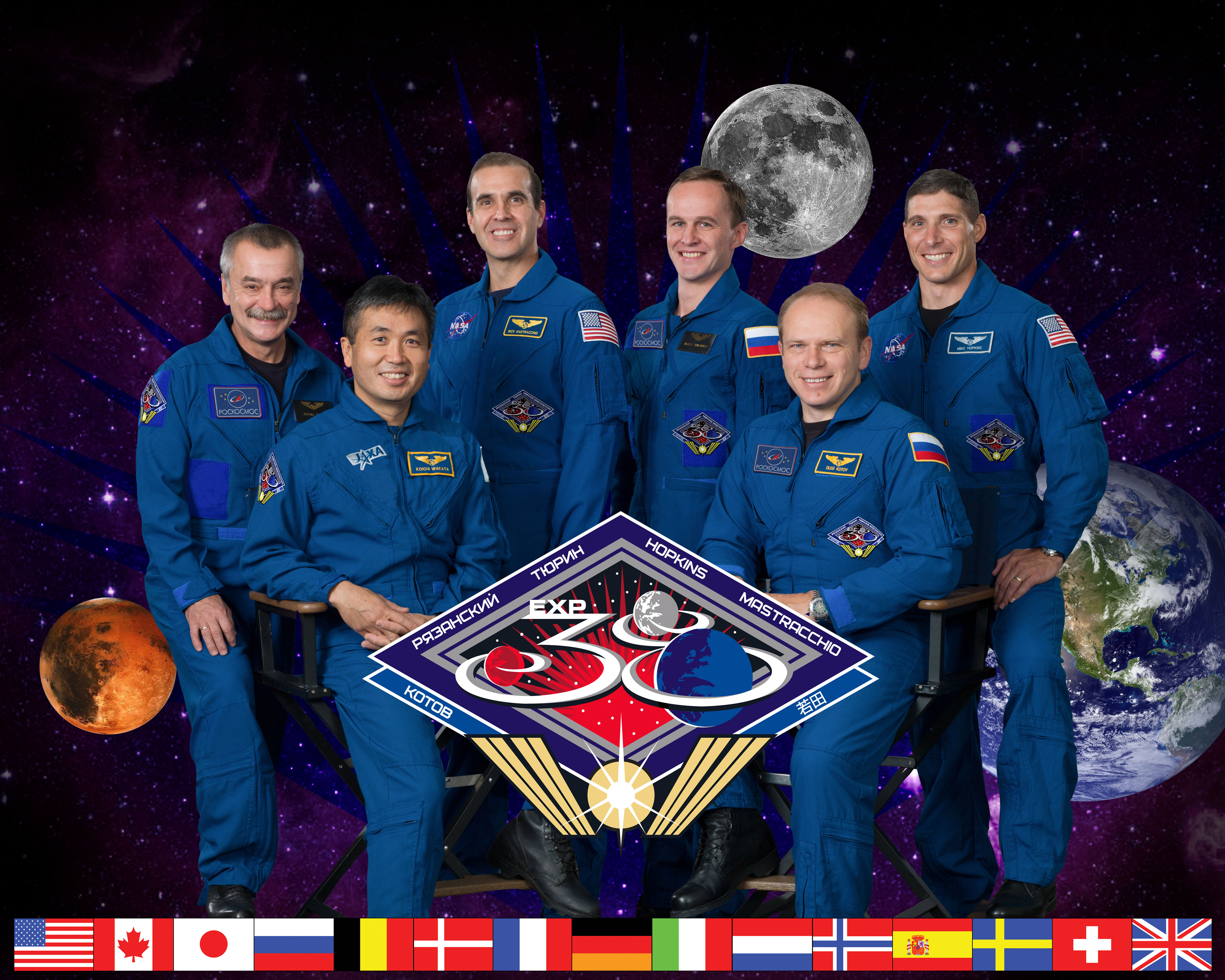
- Expedition 38 mission patch (l-r) Tyurin, Wakata, Mastracchio, Ryazansky, Kotov and Hopkins ISS expeditions

Expedition 38 was the 38th expedition to the International Space Station.

== Crew ==
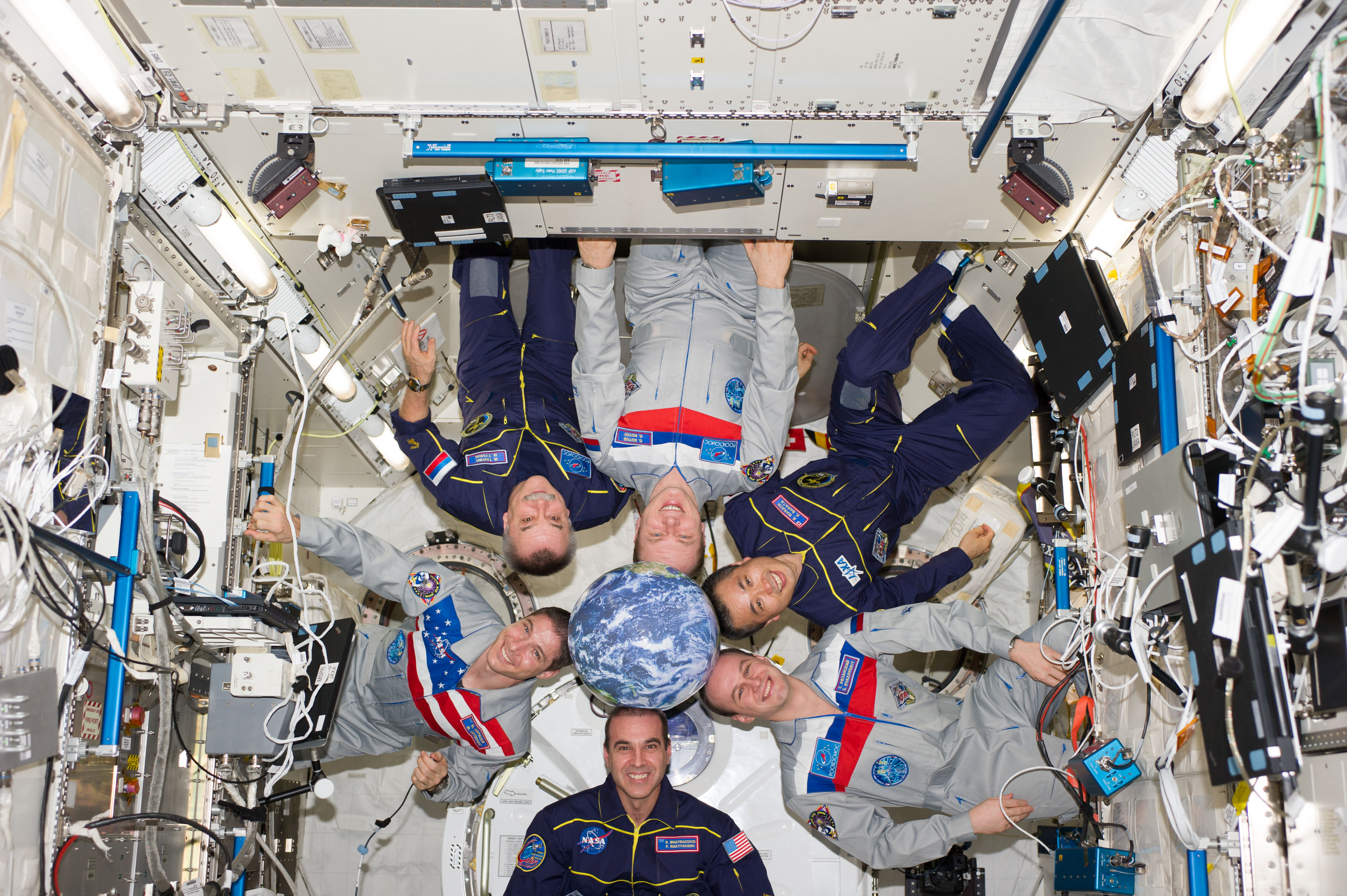
The Expedition 38 crew members. Clockwise from top center: Oleg Kotov, Koichi Wakata, Sergey Ryazansky, Richard Mastracchio, Michael Hopkins, Mikhail Tyurin.

Position	Crew
Commander	Oleg Kotov, RSA; Third and last spaceflight
Flight Engineer 1	Sergey Ryazansky, RSA; First spaceflight
Flight Engineer 2	Michael S. Hopkins, NASA; First spaceflight
Flight Engineer 3	Koichi Wakata, JAXA; Fourth spaceflight
Flight Engineer 4	Richard A. Mastracchio, NASA; Fourth and last spaceflight
Flight Engineer 5	Mikhail Tyurin, RSA; Third and last spaceflight

JAXA, NASA, ESA
