= Soyuz TMA-11M =

2013 Russian crewed spaceflight to the ISS

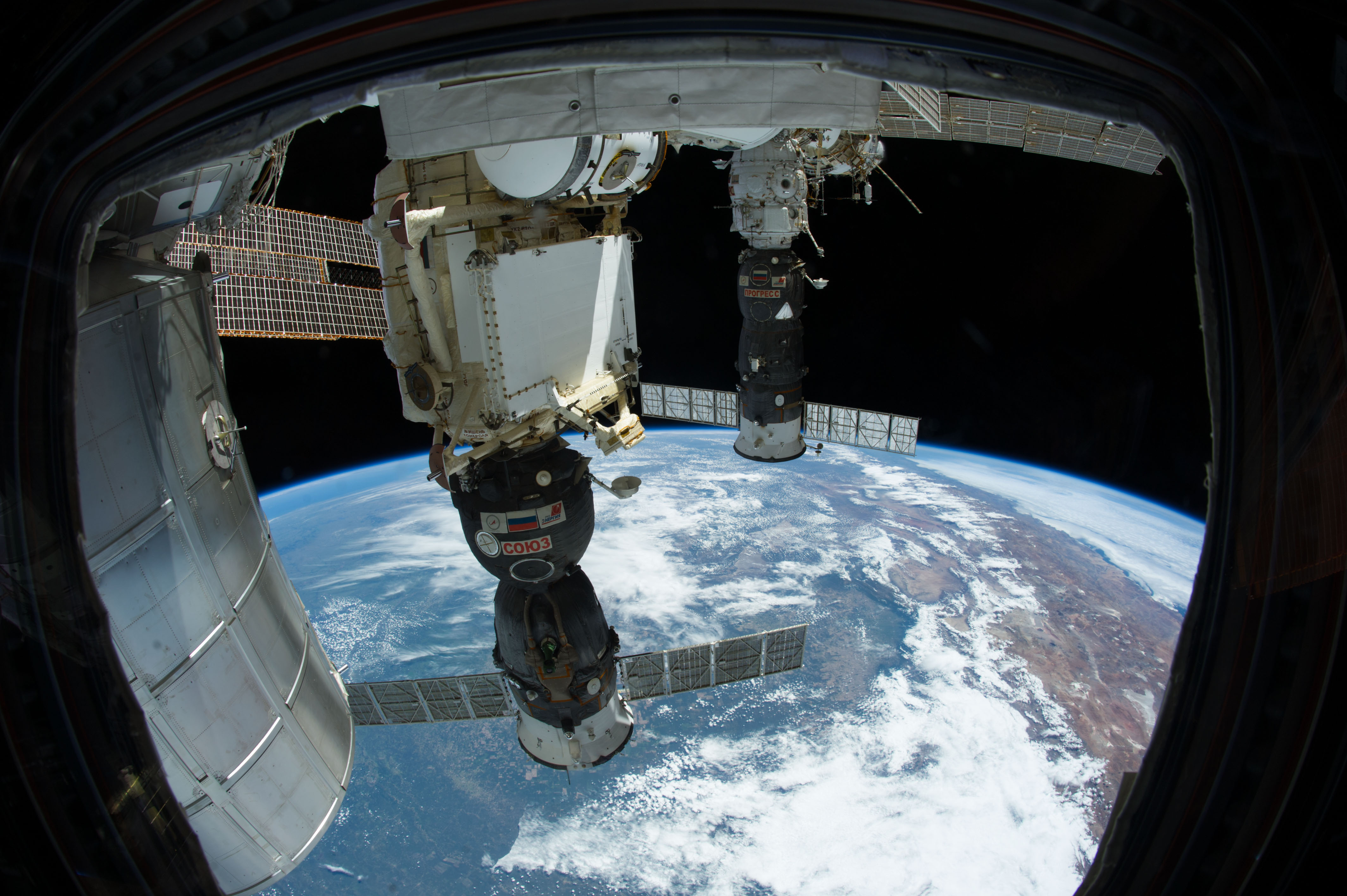
- Soyuz TMA-11M docked at the ISS (center)
- Mission type: ISS crew transport
- Operator: Roscosmos
- COSPAR ID: 2013-061A
- SATCAT no.: 39373
- Mission duration: 187 days, 21 hours, 44 minutes

Spacecraft properties
- Spacecraft: Soyuz 11F732A47 No.711
- Spacecraft type: Soyuz-TMA 11F747
- Manufacturer: Energia

Crew
- Crew size: 3
- Members: Mikhail V. Tyurin; Richard A. Mastracchio; Koichi Wakata
- Callsign: Vostok

Start of mission
- Launch date: 7 November 2013, 04:14:15 UTC
- Rocket: Soyuz-FG
- Launch site: Baikonur 1/5

End of mission
- Landing date: 14 May 2014, 01:58 UTC

Orbital parameters
- Reference system: Geocentric
- Regime: Low Earth

Docking with ISS
- Docking port: Rassvet nadir
- Docking date: 7 November 2013, 10:27 UTC
- Undocking date: 13 May 2014, 22:36 UTC
- Time docked: 187 days, 12 hours, 9 minutes
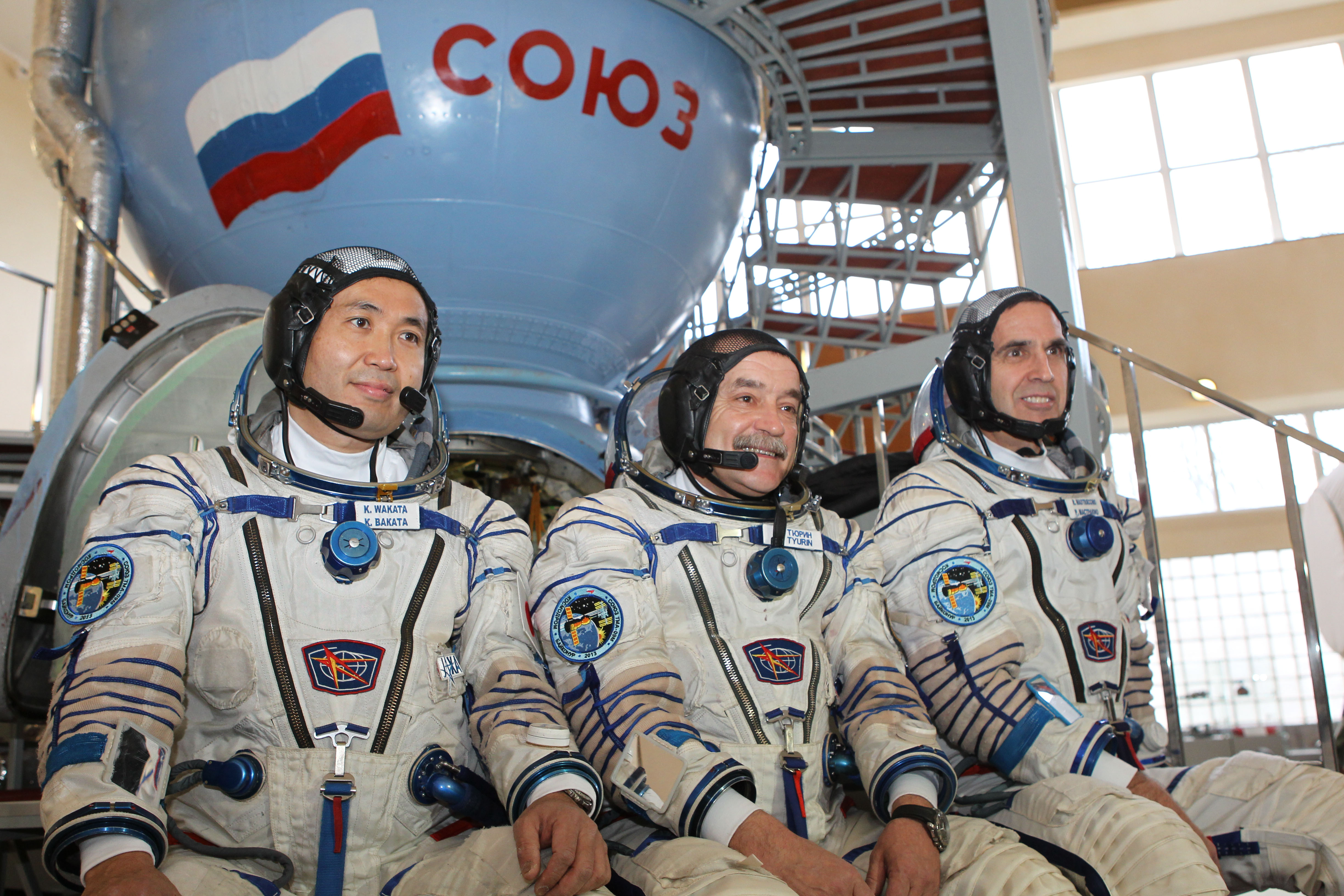
- (l-r) Wakata, Tyurin and Mastracchio Soyuz programme (Crewed missions)

Soyuz TMA-11M was a 2013 flight to the International Space Station. It transported three members of the Expedition 38 crew to the International Space Station. TMA-11M is the 120th flight of a Soyuz spacecraft, with the first flight launching in 1967. The successful docking of the Soyuz TMA-11M spacecraft on November 7, 2013 marked the first time since October 2009 that nine people have resided on the space station without the presence of a Space Shuttle.

The rocket and spacecraft carried Olympic symbols on the fairing of the ship. During the mission, the Olympic torch was passed for the first time in open space. Russian cosmonauts Oleg Kotov and Sergey Ryazansky passed it in the Russian section of the International Space Station.

== Crew ==
Position	Crew Member
Commander	(Russia) Mikhail Tyurin, Roscosmos; Expedition 38; Third and last spaceflight
Flight Engineer 1	(United States) Richard Mastracchio, NASA; Expedition 38; Fourth and last spaceflight
Flight Engineer 2	(Japan) Koichi Wakata, JAXA; Expedition 38; Fourth spaceflight

=== Backup crew ===
Position	Crew Member
Commander	(Russia) Maksim Surayev, Roscosmos
Flight Engineer 1	(United States) Reid Wiseman, NASA
Flight Engineer 2	(Germany) Alexander Gerst, ESA

== Cargo ==
TMA-11M carried the Olympic flame for the 2014 Winter Olympics into space for the first time. The torch returned to Earth 5 days later on board TMA-09M.

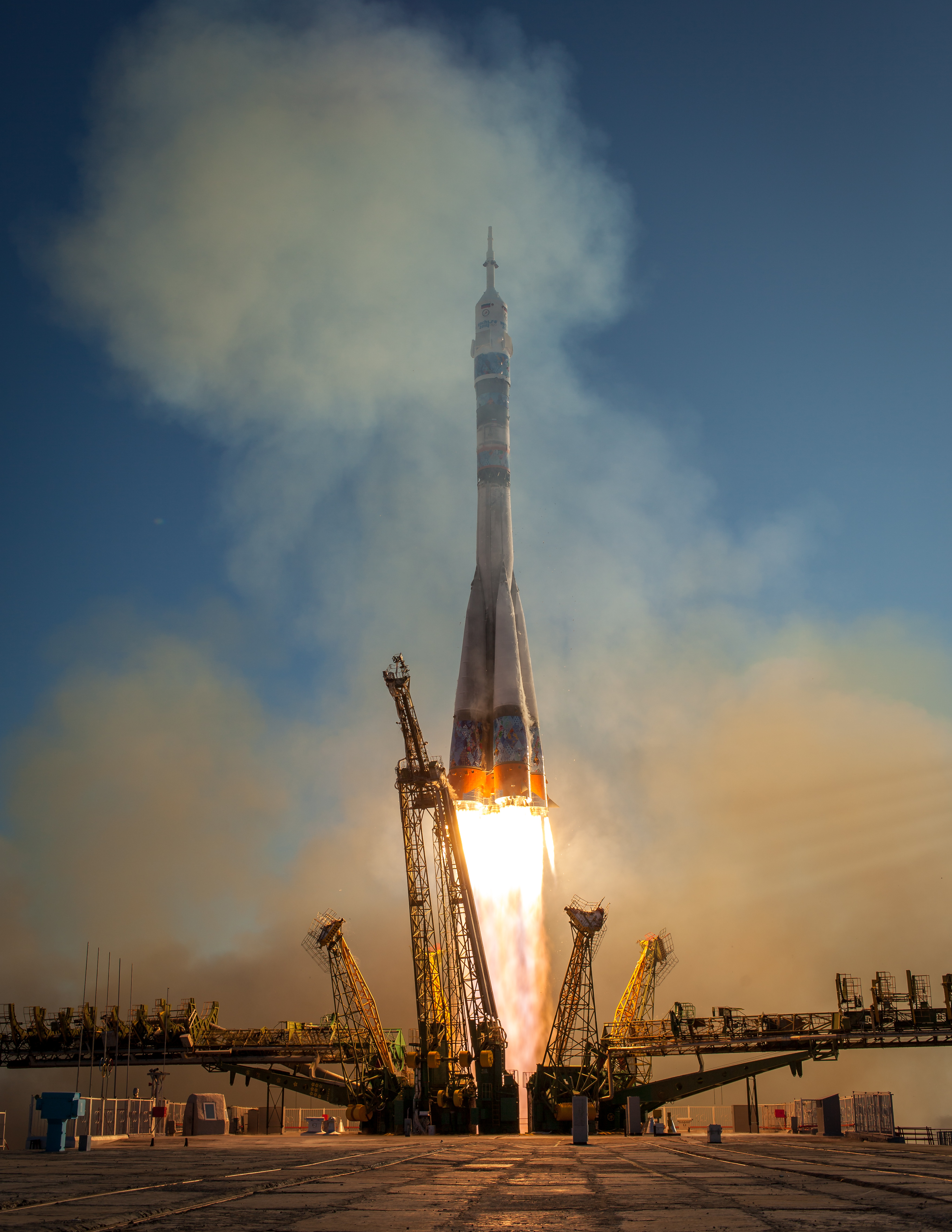
Launch of Soyuz TMA-11M

== Gallery ==
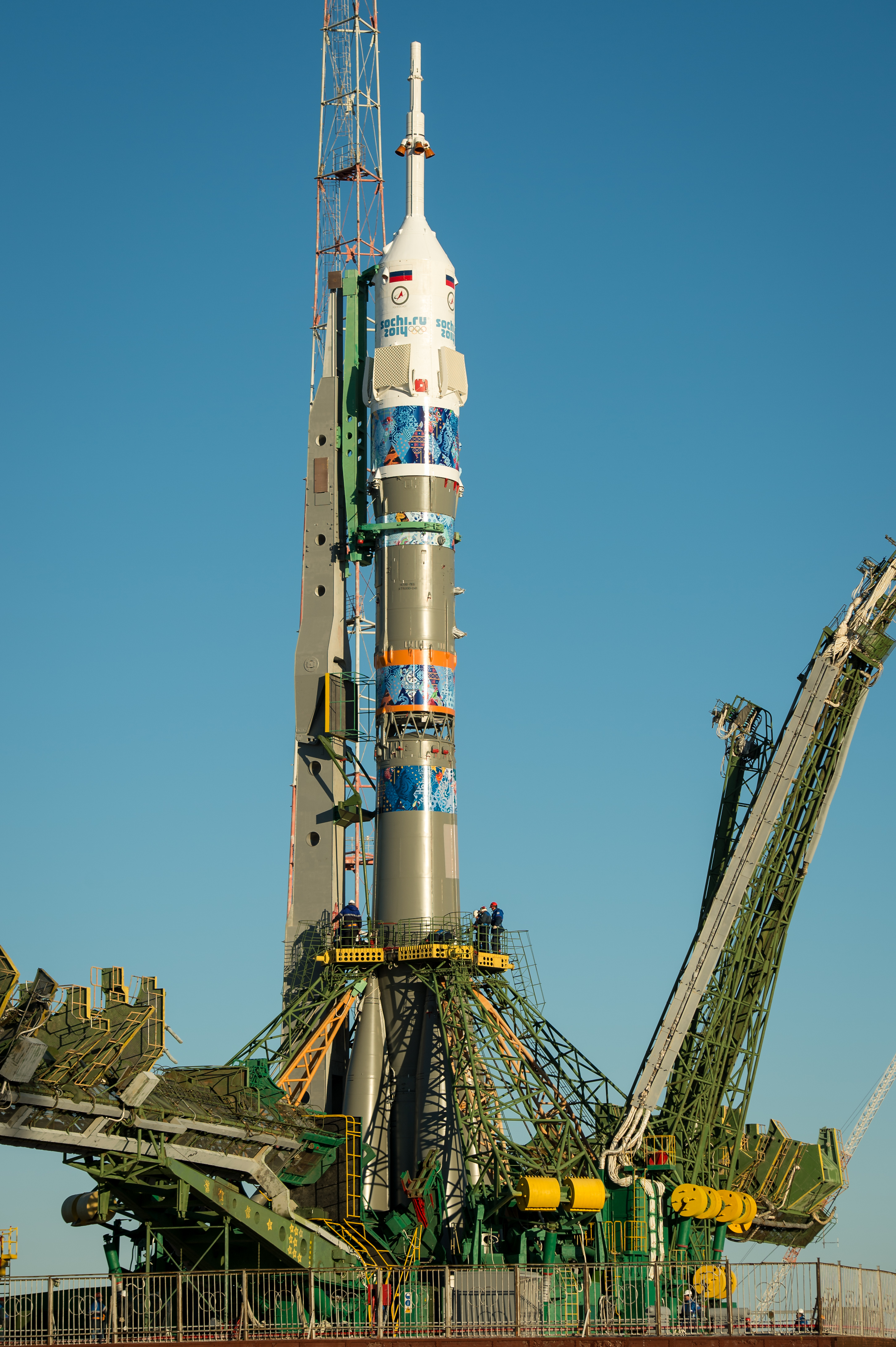
Rocket with the logo of the Sochi Olympics

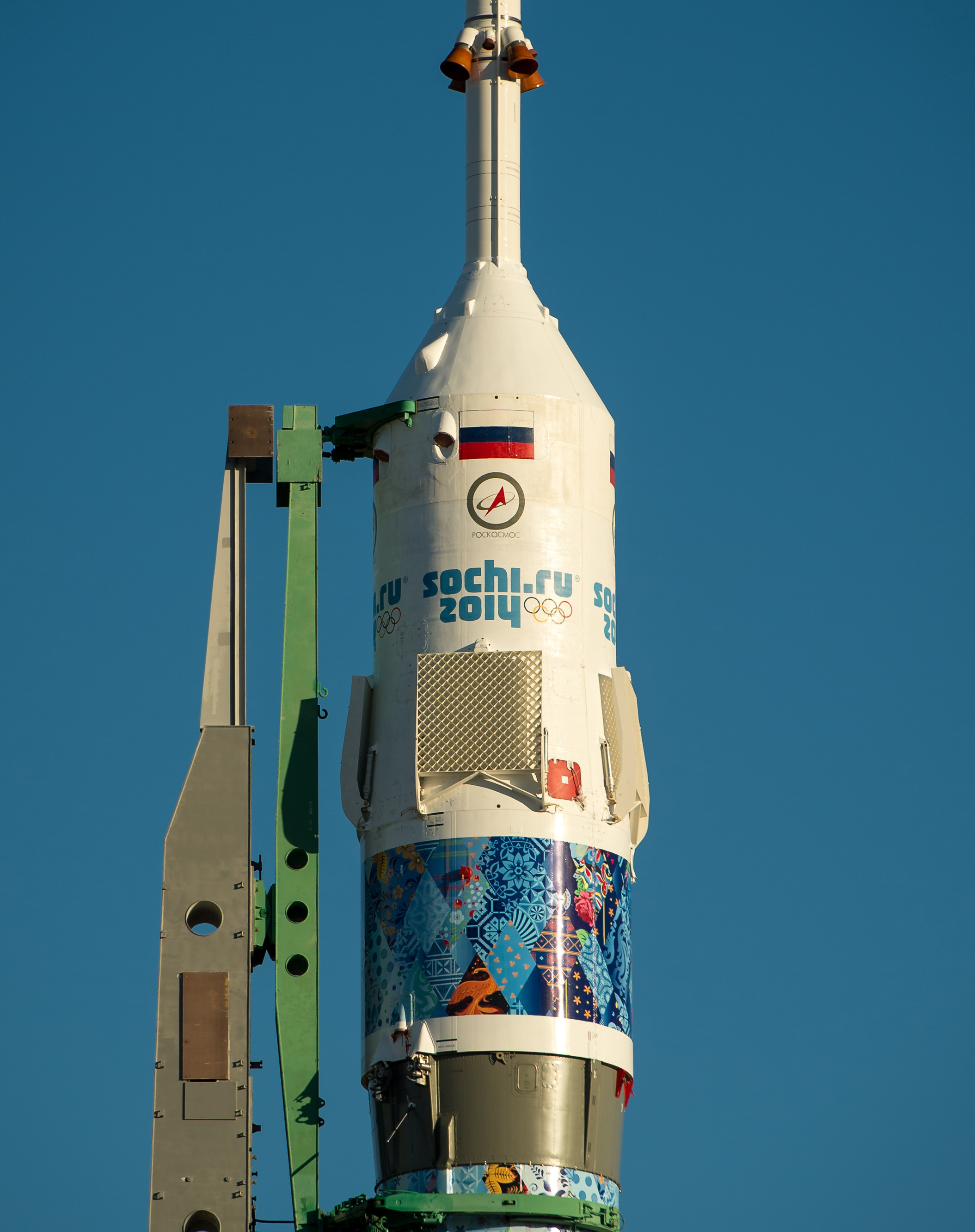
Close-up view of Soyuz capsule adorned with the Sochi Olympics logo

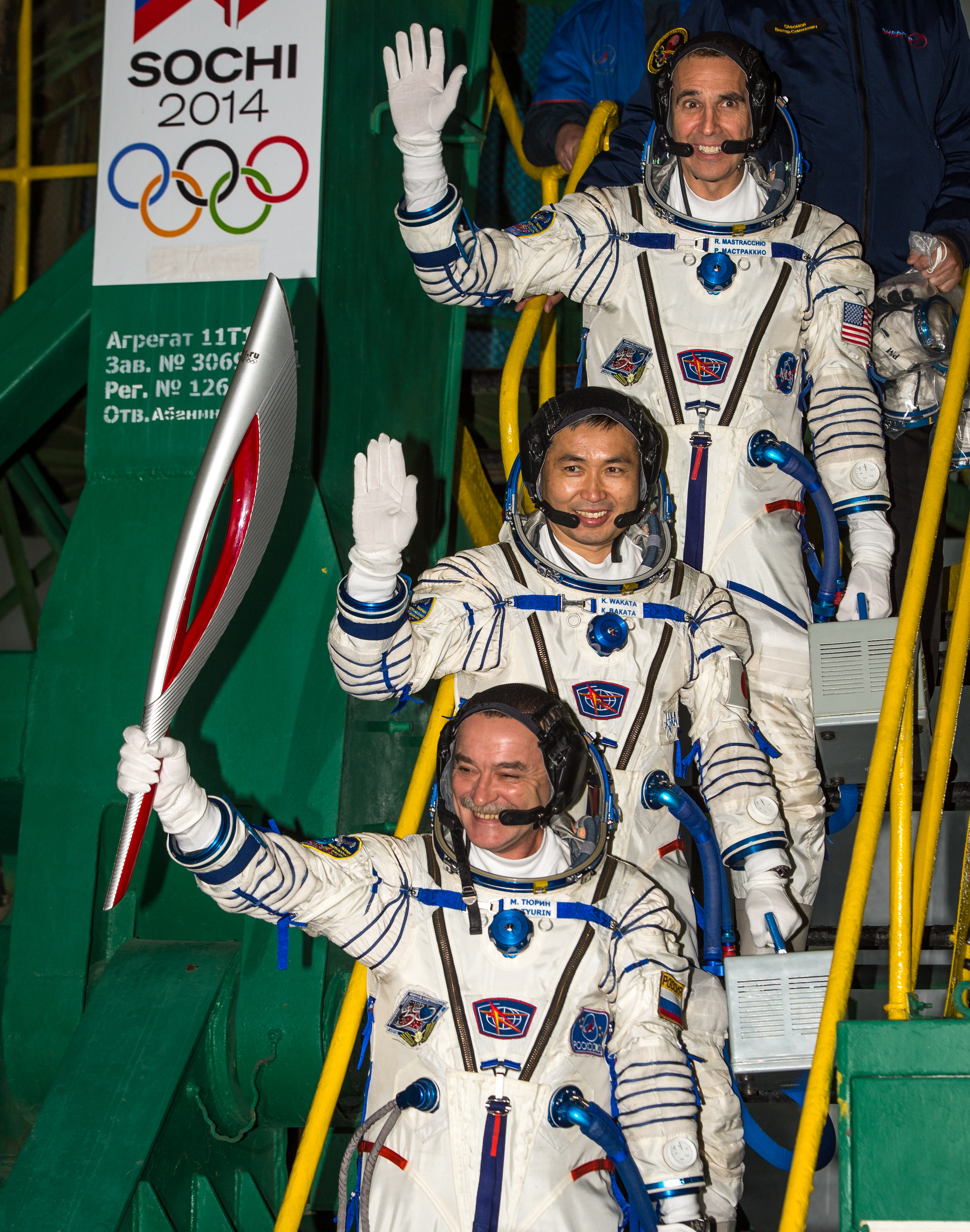
Soyuz TMA-11M crew members with the 2014 Olympic torch
