= Koichi Wakata =

Japanese engineer and astronaut (born 1963)

- 若田 光一
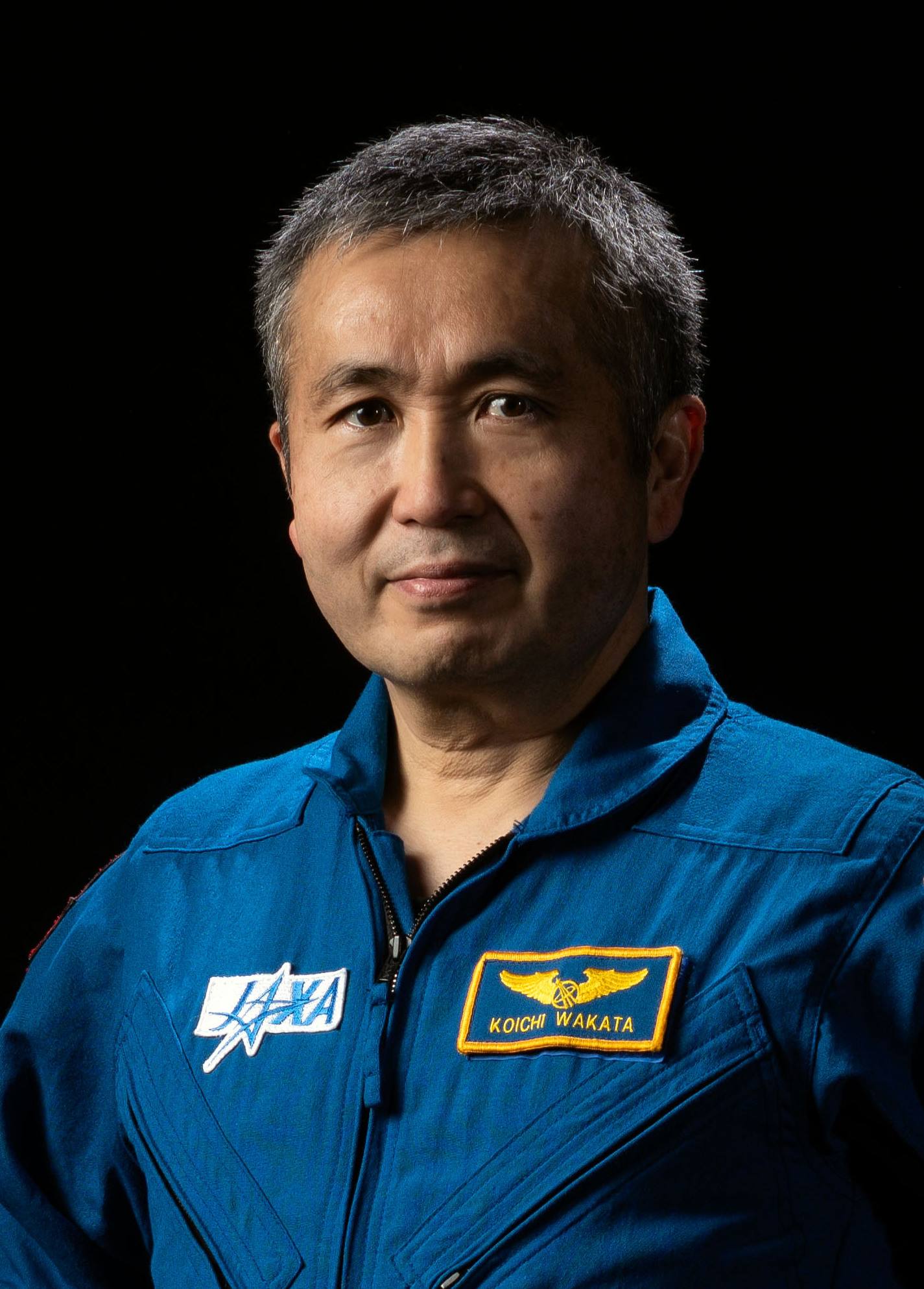
- Wakata in 2022
- Born: 1 August 1963 (age 63); Ōmiya, Saitama, Japan
- Occupation: Structural Engineer
- Space career

NASDA/JAXA astronaut
- Time in space: 504 days, 18 hours, 33 minutes
- Selection: 1992 NASDA Group, NASA Group 14 (1992)
- Total EVAs: 2
- Total EVA time: 14h, 2m
- Missions: STS-72; STS-92; STS-119/127 (Expedition 18/19/20); Soyuz TMA-11M (Expedition 38/39); SpaceX Crew-5 (Expedition 68)
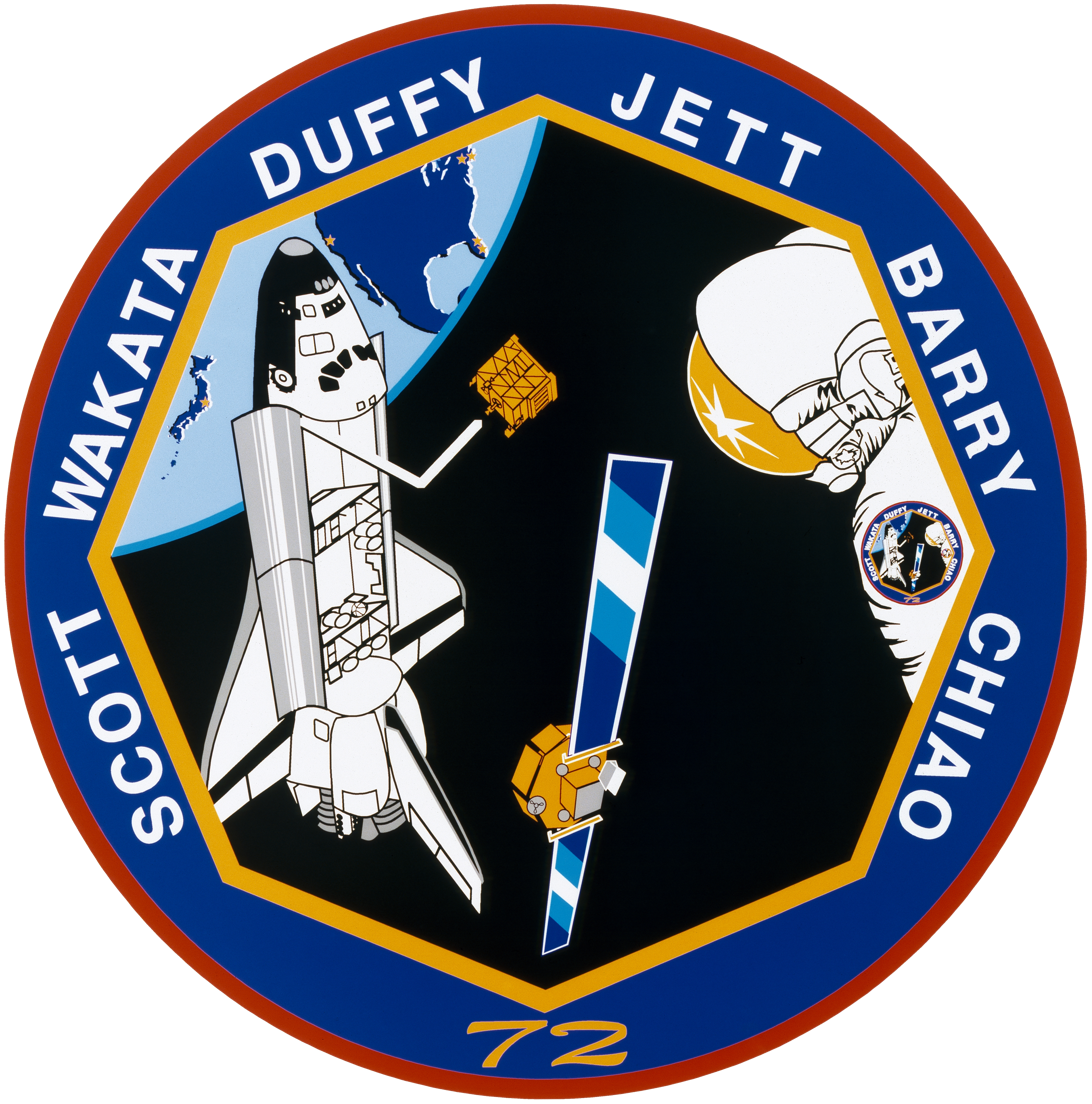
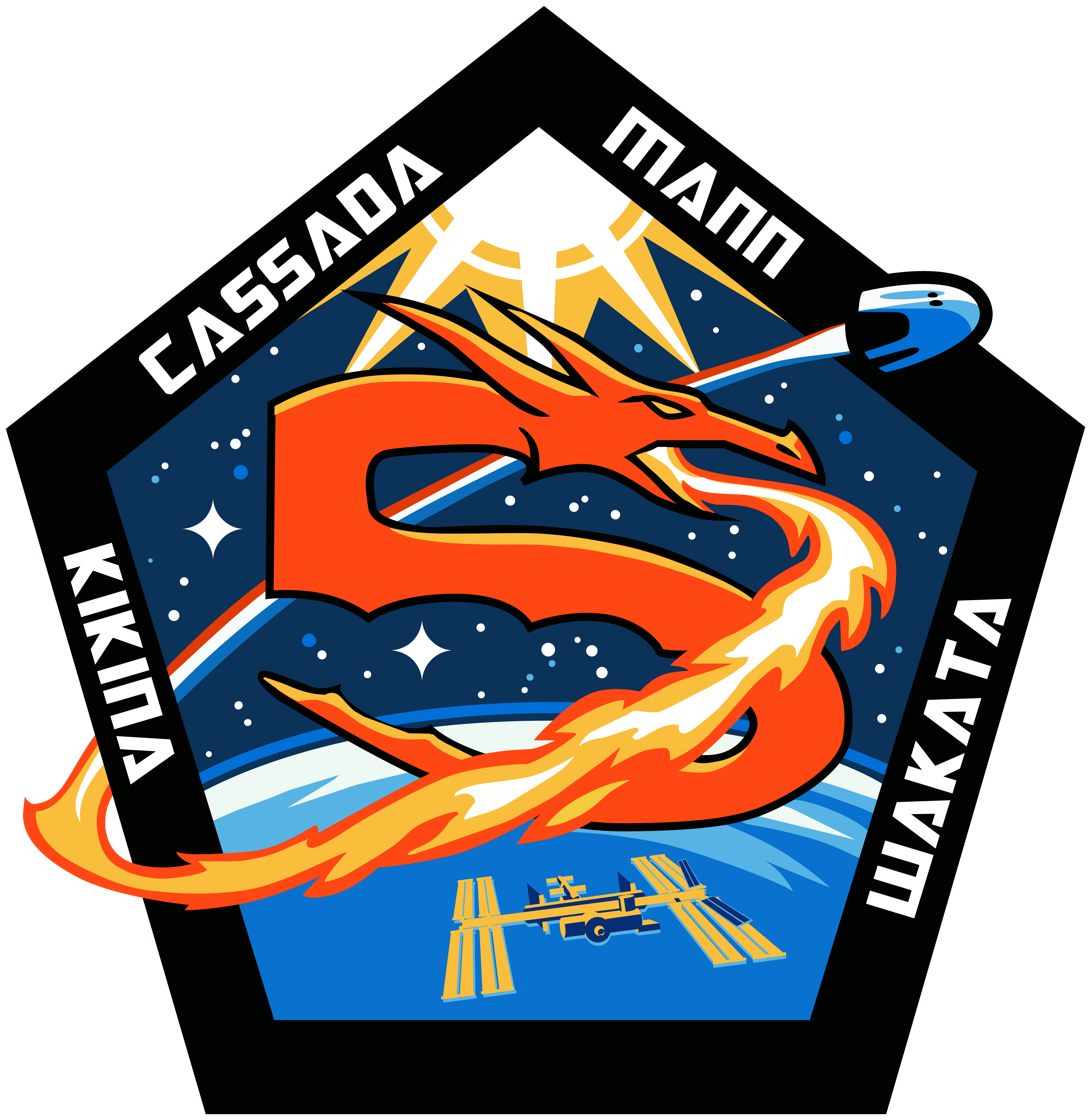
- Mission insignia
- Retired: 31 March 2024

Koichi Wakata (若田 光一, Wakata Kōichi; born 1 August 1963) is a Japanese engineer and an astronaut working for Axiom Space. Wakata retired from JAXA in 2024 after a career in spaceflight spanning nearly two decades. He logged over 500 days in space across five missions: three aboard the Space Shuttle, one on the Soyuz, and one on the Crew Dragon. His missions included three long-duration stays on the International Space Station (ISS) and two short-duration flights—one to the ISS and one aboard the Space Shuttle. Notably, during Expedition 39, he became the first Japanese commander of the ISS.

== Career ==
Wakata was born in Ōmiya, Saitama, Japan, earned a Bachelor of Science degree in Aeronautical Engineering in 1987, a Master of Science degree in Applied Mechanics in 1989, and a Doctorate in Aerospace Engineering in 2004 from Kyushu University. He worked as a structural engineer for Japan Airlines.

== JAXA career ==
Wakata was selected by the National Space Development Agency of Japan (NASDA) (now JAXA) as an astronaut candidate in 1992, and trained at NASA's Johnson Space Center. Wakata has held a number of assignments, and during STS-85, Wakata acted as NASDA Assistant Payload Operations Director for the Manipulator Flight Demonstration, a robotic arm experiment for the Japanese Experiment Module of the International Space Station (ISS). In December 2000, he became a NASA robotics instructor astronaut. In July 2006, he served as commander of the 10th NASA Extreme Environment Mission Operations (NEEMO) mission, a seven-day undersea expedition at the National Oceanic and Atmospheric Administration’s Aquarius laboratory located off the coast of Florida. In August 2006, he started flight engineer training for Russian Soyuz spacecraft in preparation for a long-duration stay on the ISS.

== Spaceflight experience ==
Wakata first flew aboard STS-72 in 1996, and then returned to space on STS-92 in 2000. Wakata launched to the International Space Station (ISS) for a long-duration mission as part of Expeditions 18, 19, and 20 on STS-119 on March 15, 2009 and returned to the earth aboard Endeavour with the STS-127 crew four and a half months later on July 31, 2009. On November 7, 2013 Wataka returned to the ISS aboard Soyuz TMA-11M for a six-month mission covering Expeditions 38 and 39. He became the ISS commander for the last two months of that mission on Expedition 39.

=== STS-72 ===
On STS-72, Wakata became the first Japanese mission specialist. STS-72 retrieved the Space Flyer Unit (launched from Japan ten months earlier), deployed and retrieved the OAST-Flyer, and evaluated techniques to be used in the assembly of the International Space Station.

During STS-72, Wakata and fellow astronaut Dan Barry became the first people to play the game Go in space. Wakata and Barry used a special Go set, which was named Go Space, designed by Wai-Cheung Willson Chow.

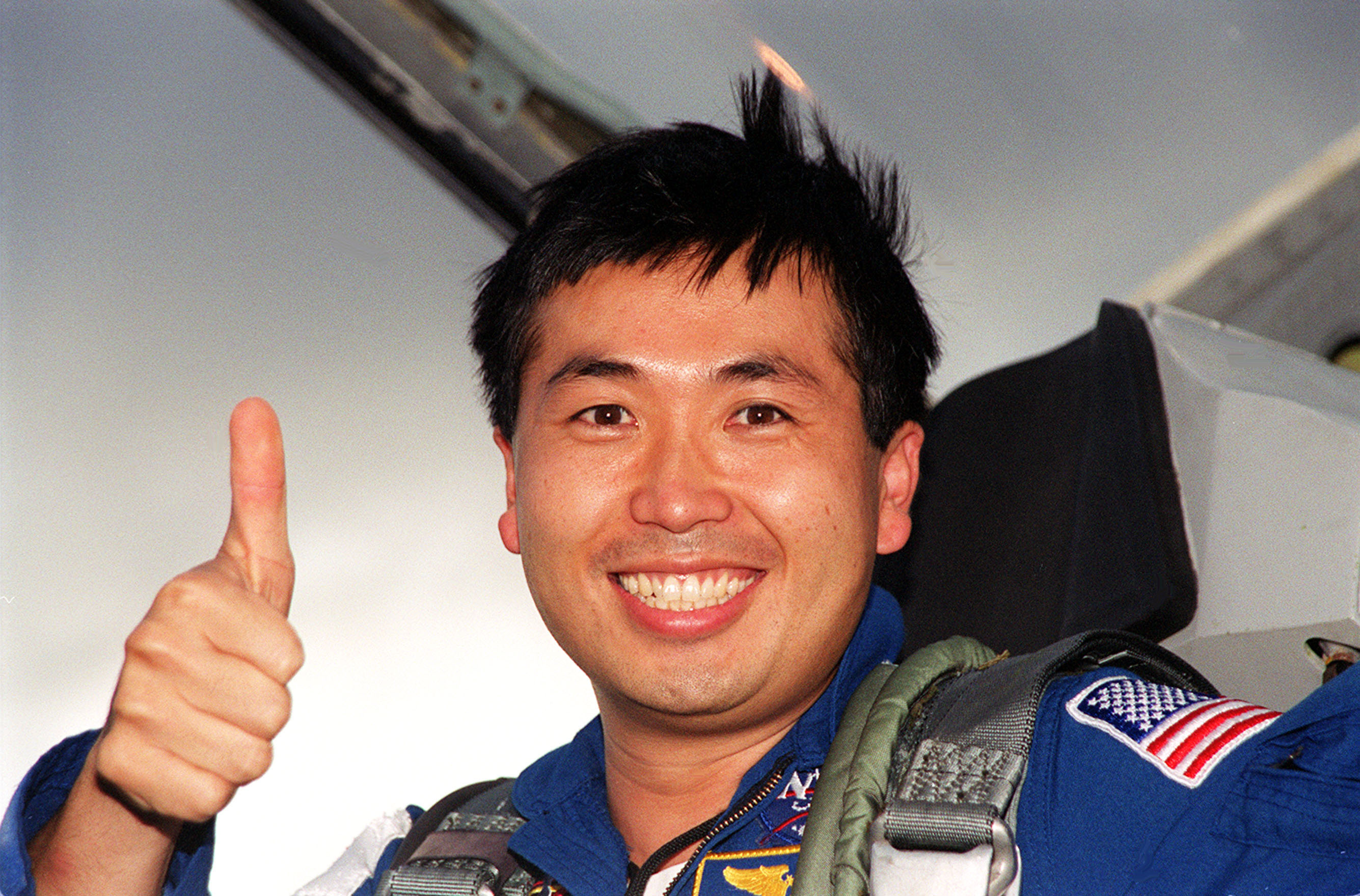
Wakata giving a thumbs-up as he arrives at Kennedy Space Center for the launch of the STS-92 mission

=== STS-92 ===
Wakata became the first Japanese astronaut to work on the assembly of the International Space Station during STS-92. The crew attached the Z1 truss and Pressurized Mating Adapter (PMA3) to the station using Discovery’s robotic arm. STS-92 prepared the station for its first resident crew.

=== Expedition 18/19/20 ===
In February 2007, Wakata was assigned as a flight engineer to ISS Expedition 18, scheduled to begin in winter of 2008. He launched with the crew of STS-119 and was the first resident station crew member from the Japanese Aerospace Exploration Agency (JAXA). He served as flight engineer 2 on Expedition 18, Expedition 19 and Expedition 20, before returning home as a mission specialist on STS-127.

Wakata was the first Japanese astronaut to take part in a long-duration mission on the station.

Wakata is the first person to serve on five different crews without returning to Earth: STS-119, Expedition 18, Expedition 19, Expedition 20 and STS-127.

During his time on the station, he took part in experiments suggested by the public, including flying a "magic carpet", folding laundry and doing pushups.

As an experiment on the station, he wore the same special underpants for a month without washing them. Wakata returned to Earth in July 2009 aboard Endeavour with the STS-127 crew after being a flight engineer on the station. American and Canadian astronauts aboard STS-127 delivered and installed the final two components of the Japanese Experiment Module: the Exposed Facility (JEM-EF), and the Exposed Section (JEM-ES).

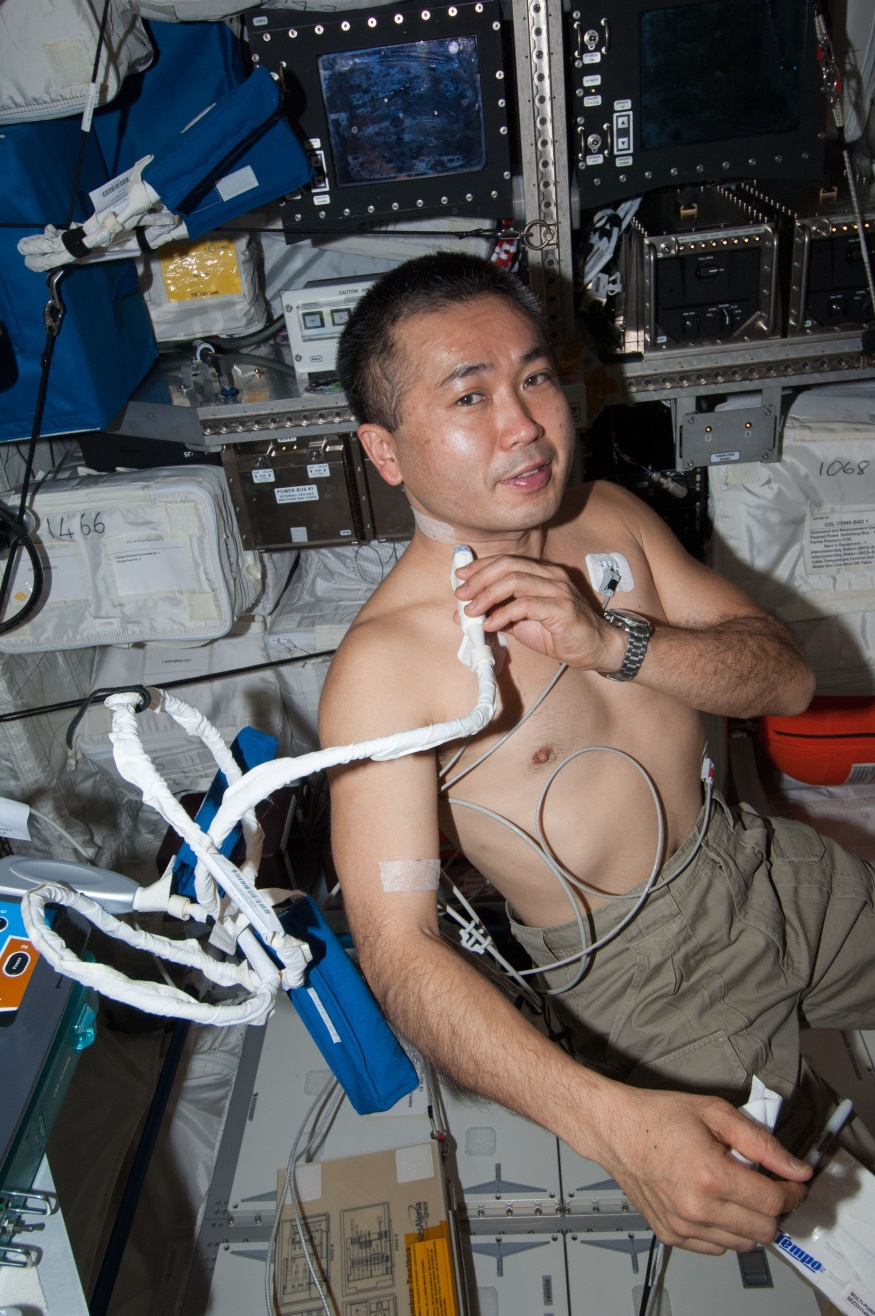
Wakata demonstrating medical ultrasound equipment during Expedition 38

=== Expedition 38/39 ===
Wakata launched on Soyuz TMA-11M to the International Space Station in November 2013. During Expedition 38 and Expedition 39, Kirobo—who had the mission to serve as a companion robot to the astronaut—worked closely with Wakata, conducting experiments in space through verbal orders from the astronaut. One of the experiments was the first-ever human-robot conversation in space. Wakata arrived on the International Space Station as part of Expedition 38 in late 2013. He became the commander of the International Space Station with Expedition 39, in March 2014. This marked the first time a Japanese astronaut became ISS station commander, and only the third time an astronaut of neither Russian nor American citizenship served as station commander. Wakata returned to Earth on May 13, 2014.

=== SpaceX Crew-5 ===
Wakata trained as backup for JAXA astronaut and SpaceX Crew-1 mission specialist Soichi Noguchi ahead of his long duration stay aboard of the ISS as part of Expedition 64. Shortly after Noguchi's launch in November 2020, JAXA announced that Wakata would return to the ISS for another long-duration mission in 2022. On 21 May 2021 NASA announced JAXA astronaut Koichi Wakata as the fourth member of the crew, in cooperation with JAXA as NASA's international partner. In October 2021, Wakata was reassigned to the SpaceX Crew-5 flight.

=== Post-JAXA career ===
Wakata retired from JAXA at the end of March 2024. On April 8, 2024, it was announced that Wakata had joined Axiom Space as an astronaut and Chief Technical Officer for the Asia-Pacific Region.

== Personal information ==
Wakata is married to Stefanie von Sachsen-Altenburg of Bonn, Germany, and has a son. He is a multi-engine and instrument-rated pilot, and has logged over 2100 hours in a variety of aircraft.

== Honors and awards ==
Minor planet 6208 Wakata is named after him.

| Preceded by Oleg Kotov | ISS Expedition Commander; 10 March 2014 to 13 May 2014 | Succeeded by Steven Swanson |
