= John Herrington =

American astronaut, aviator and engineer (born 1958)

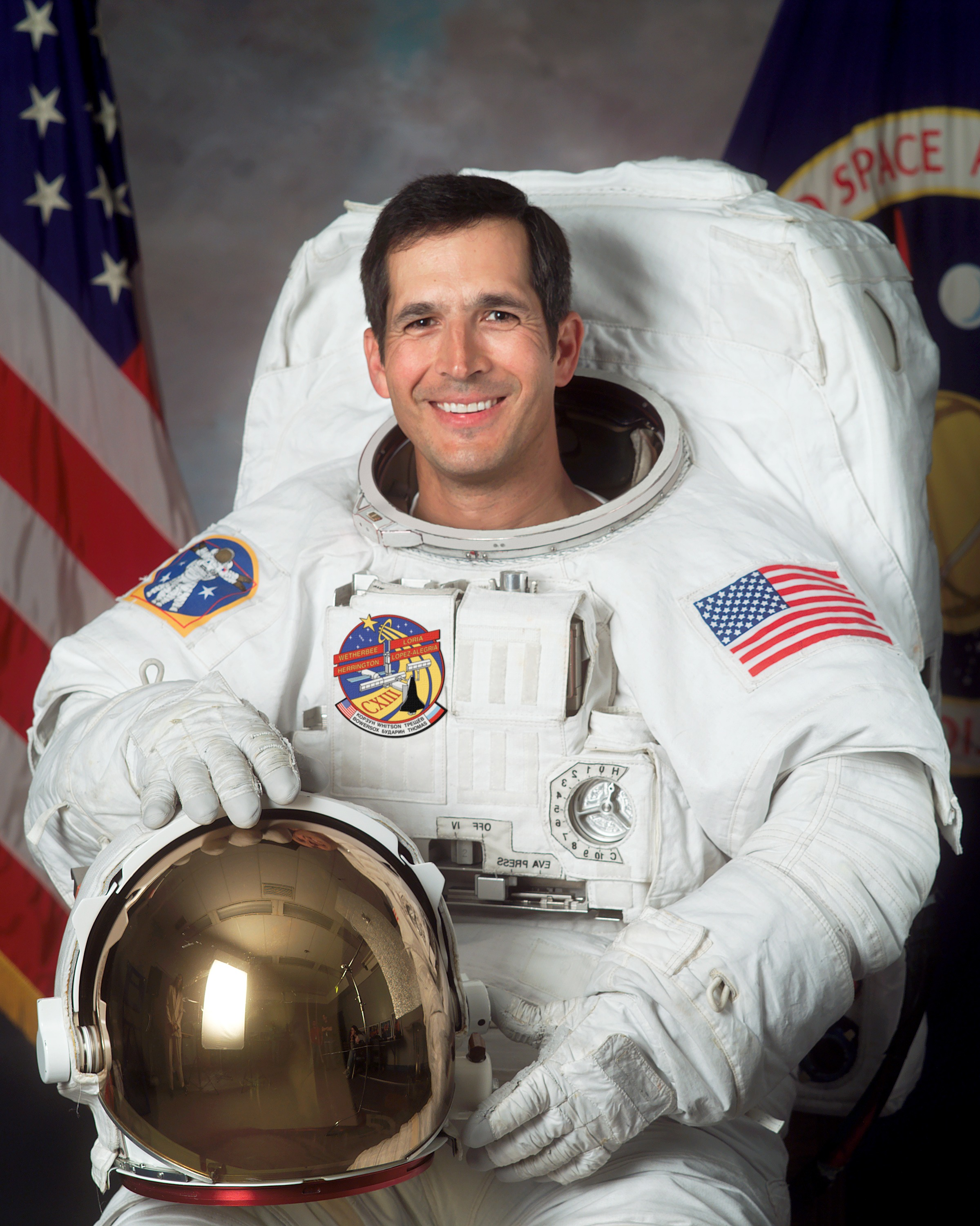
- Herrington in 2002
- Born: John Bennett Herrington; September 14, 1958 (age 68); Wetumka, Oklahoma, U.S.
- Citizenship: Chickasaw Nation and U.S.
- Education: BA: University of Colorado, Colorado Springs, MS: Naval Postgraduate School, PhD: University of Idaho (2014)
- Awards: Chickasaw Hall of Fame (2002)
- Space career

NASA astronaut
- Rank: Commander, USN
- Time in space: 13d 18h 47m
- Selection: NASA Group 16 (1996)
- Total EVAs: 3
- Total EVA time: 19h, 55m
- Mission: STS-113
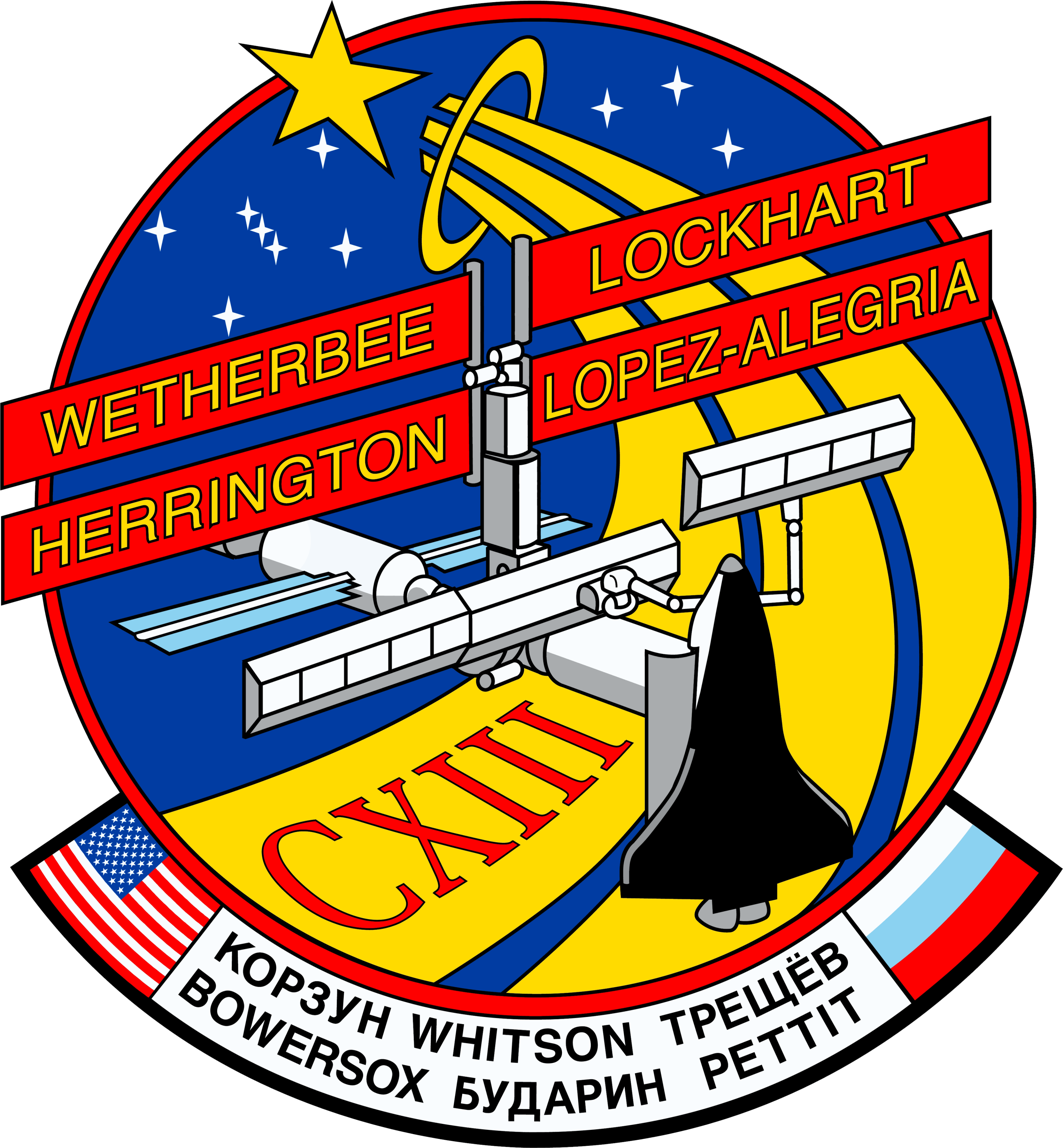
- Mission insignia

John Bennett Herrington (Chickasaw Nation, born September 14, 1958) is a retired United States Naval Aviator, engineer and former NASA astronaut. In 2002, Herrington became the first enrolled citizen of a Native American tribe to fly in space. (Note: William R. Pogue was of Choctaw ancestry and was a crewman aboard Skylab 4 in 1973–1974, but he was not an enrolled tribal member.)

== Early life and education ==
Herrington was born in Wetumka, Oklahoma, into the Chickasaw Nation. He grew up in Colorado Springs, Colorado, Riverton, Wyoming, and Plano, Texas, where he graduated from Plano Senior High School. After moving to Colorado to pursue a degree, he developed an interest in rock climbing in the Colorado mountains. He earned a bachelor's degree in applied mathematics from the University of Colorado Colorado Springs before receiving his commission in the United States Navy in 1984.

To honor his Chickasaw heritage, Herrington, an enrolled citizen of the Chickasaw Nation, carried its flag on his thirteen-day trip to space. The flag had been presented to him by Chickasaw Nation Governor Bill Anoatubby.

In 2014, he earned his PhD in education from the University of Idaho.

== United States Navy career ==
Herrington received his commission in the U.S. Navy from the Aviation Officer Candidate School at Naval Air Station Pensacola, Florida in March 1984. In March 1985 he was designated a Naval Aviator and proceeded to Patrol Squadron Thirty-One (VP-31) at Moffett Field, California for training in the P-3C Orion. His first operational assignment was with Patrol Squadron Forty-Eight (VP-48) where he made three operational deployments, two to the Northern Pacific-based from Naval Air Facility Adak, Alaska and one to the Western Pacific-based from the Naval Air Station Cubi Point, Philippines. While assigned to VP-48, Herrington was designated a Patrol Plane Commander, Mission Commander, and Patrol Plane Instructor Pilot.

Following completion of his first operational tour, Herrington returned to VP-31 as a Fleet Replacement Squadron Instructor Pilot. While assigned to VP-31, he was selected to attend the United States Naval Test Pilot School at Naval Air Station Patuxent River, Maryland in January 1990. After graduation in December 1990, he reported to the Force Warfare Aircraft Test Directorate as a project test pilot for the Joint Primary Aircraft Training System. Herrington conducted additional flight test assignments flying numerous variants of the P-3 Orion as well as the T-34C and the de Havilland Canada Dash 7. Following his selection as an Aeronautical Engineering Duty Officer (AEDO), Herrington reported to the U.S. Naval Postgraduate School, where he attained a Master of Science degree in aeronautical engineering in June 1995. Herrington was assigned as a special projects officer to the Bureau of Naval Personnel Sea Duty Component when selected for the astronaut program.

During his military service, he was awarded the Navy Commendation Medal, Navy Meritorious Unit Commendation, Coast Guard Meritorious Unit Commendation, Coast Guard Special Operations Service Ribbon, National Defense Service Medal, Sea Service Ribbons (3), and various other service awards.

== NASA career ==
Selected by NASA in April 1996, Herrington reported to the Lyndon B. Johnson Space Center in August 1996. He completed two years of training and evaluation, and qualified for flight assignment as a mission specialist. Herrington was assigned to the Flight Support Branch of the Astronaut Office where he served as a member of the Astronaut Support Personnel team responsible for Shuttle launch preparations and post-landing operations.

=== Spaceflight ===
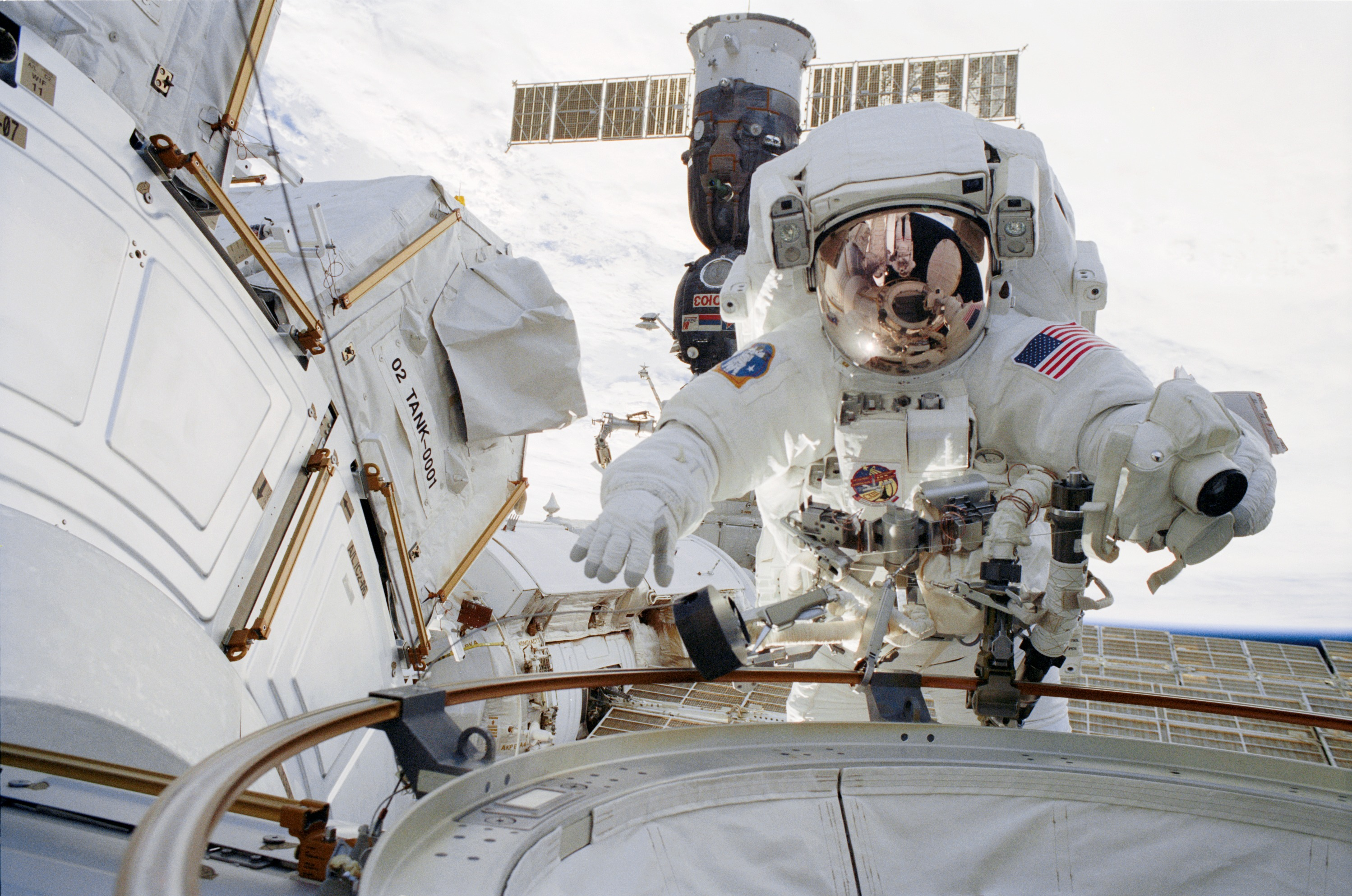
Herrington making a spacewalk during the STS-113 mission

Herrington was selected as a mission specialist for STS-113, the sixteenth Space Shuttle mission to the International Space Station. Endeavour was launched from Kennedy Space Center on November 23, 2002, to deliver the P1 Truss segment, which provides structural support for the Space Station radiators. Endeavour also delivered a new Expedition 6 crew to the Station, returning to Earth on December 7, 2002, with the Expedition 5 crew ending their 6-month stay in space. The total mission duration was 13 days, 18 hours and 47 minutes.

During the mission Herrington performed three spacewalks, totaling 19 hours and 55 minutes. These spacewalks are commemorated on the reverse of the 2019 Sacagawea dollar coin.

=== Underwater laboratory ===
In July 2004, Herrington served as the commander of the NEEMO 6 mission aboard the Aquarius underwater laboratory, living and working underwater for ten days.

Herrington retired from the Navy and NASA in July 2005.

== Rocketplane ==
In September 2005, Herrington resigned from NASA to become Vice President/Director of flight Operations for Rocketplane Limited, Inc., where he replaced Mitchell Burnside Clapp. He was also to serve as the pilot of the XP Spaceplane. Herrington also provides part-time support for the Center for Space Studies at the University of Colorado at Colorado Springs.

In December 2007, Herrington resigned from Rocketplane, and stated that he plans to continue doing public speaking engagements as well as work with the Chickasaw Nation.

== Cross-country bike ride ==
In 2008, Herrington embarked on a cross-country bicycle ride through the United States from Cape Flattery, Washington, to Cape Canaveral, Florida. The ride took three months, from August 13 to November 15, 2008.

== Honors ==
Herrington was inducted into the Chickasaw Hall of Fame in 2002. In 2017, Herrington was inducted into the International Air & Space Hall of Fame at the San Diego Air & Space Museum. In 2018, he became one of the inductees in the first induction ceremony held by the National Native American Hall of Fame.

== In media ==
In 2016 Herrington authored a children's book called Mission to Space published by White Dog Press, a secondary imprint of Chickasaw Press. In the book, Herrington shares his passion for space travel and provides a glimpse into his astronaut training and mission to the International Space Station. The book includes an English to Chickasaw vocabulary list with space-related terms.

== Speaking ==
Herrington currently travels the nation speaking to students, educators, nonprofits and corporations on an array of topics originating from his unique background in STEM and aviation. He represented by the Key Speakers Bureau.
