= Jim Wetherbee =

American astronaut, aviator and engineer (born 1952)

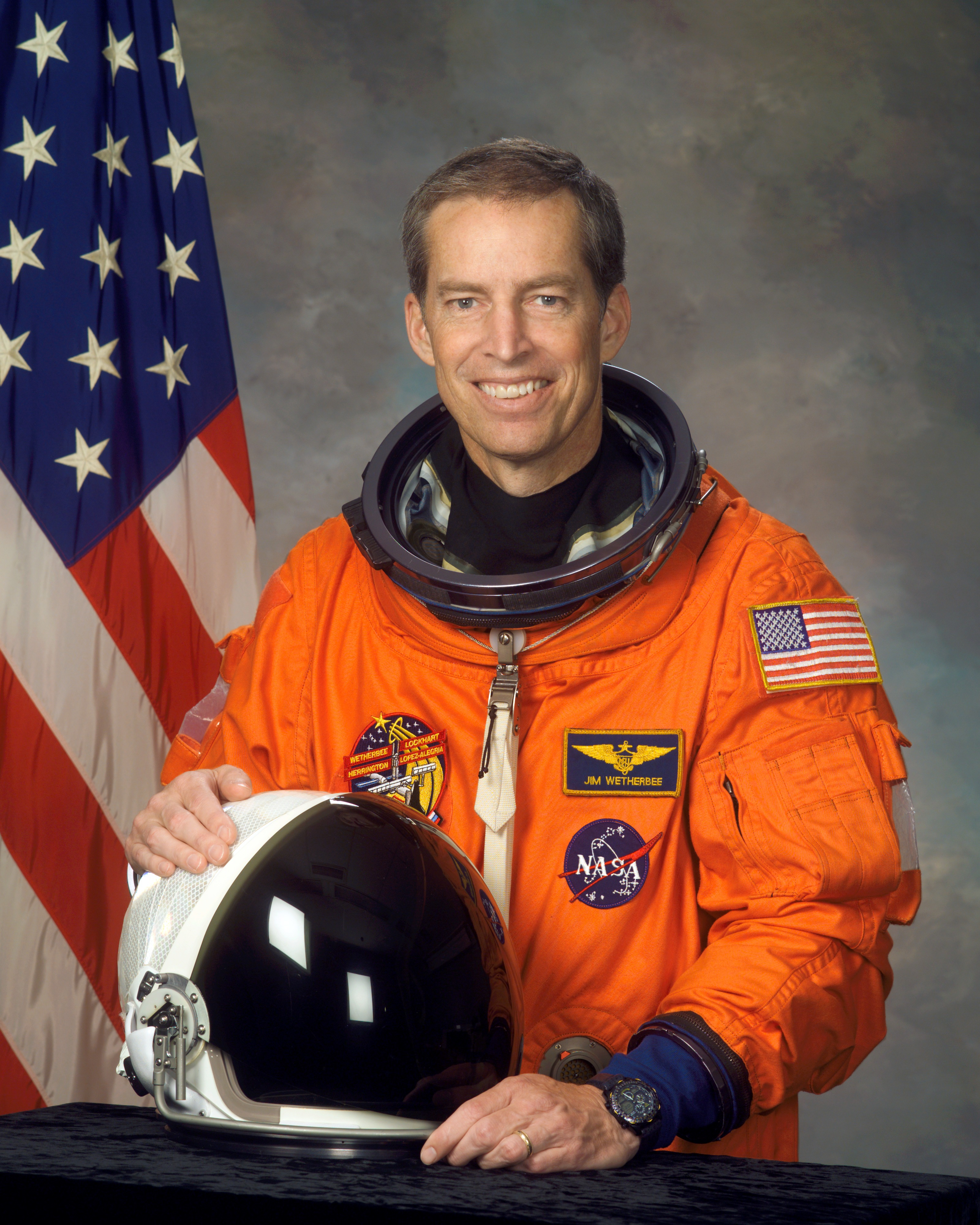
- Born: James Donald Wetherbee; November 27, 1952 (age 73); New York City, New York, U.S.
- Other name: Wxb
- Education: University of Notre Dame (BS)
- Awards: Distinguished Flying Cross
- Space career

NASA astronaut
- Rank: Captain, USN
- Time in space: 66d 10h 23m
- Selection: NASA Group 10 (1984)
- Missions: STS-32; STS-52; STS-63; STS-86; STS-102; STS-113
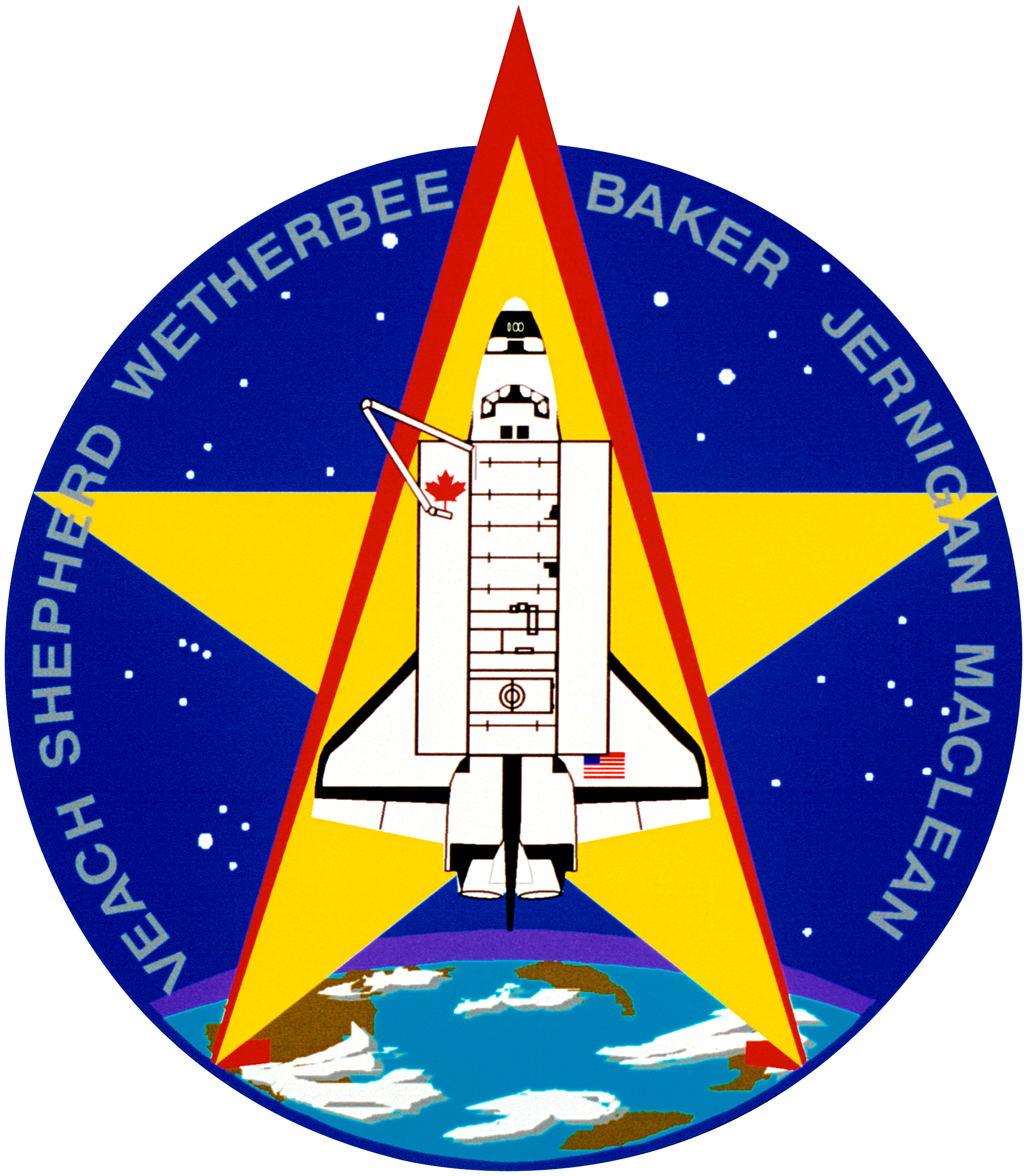
- Mission insignia
- Retired: January 3, 2005

James Donald Wetherbee (born November 27, 1952) is a retired United States Navy officer and aviator, test pilot, aerospace engineer, and NASA astronaut. He is a veteran of six Space Shuttle missions and is the only American to have commanded five spaceflight missions.

== Early life and education ==
Wetherbee was born on November 27, 1952, in Flushing, New York, and raised in Huntington Station, New York. He enjoys tennis, skiing, softball, running, and music. He graduated from Holy Family Diocesan High School in South Huntington, New York, in 1970. He earned a Bachelor of Science degree in Aerospace Engineering from the University of Notre Dame in 1974.

== Naval service ==
Following his graduation from Notre Dame, he received his commission in the United States Navy, in 1975. He was designated a Naval Aviator in December 1976. After training in the A-7E, he was assigned to Attack Squadron 72 (VA-72) from August 1977 to November 1980, aboard the aircraft carrier, USS John F. Kennedy, and logged 125 night carrier landings.

After attending the U.S. Naval Test Pilot School in Patuxent River, Maryland, in 1981, he was assigned to the Systems Engineering Test Directorate. He was a project officer and test pilot for the weapons delivery system and avionics integration for the F/A-18 aircraft. Subsequently, assigned to Strike Fighter Squadron 132 (VFA-132), he flew operationally in the F/A-18 from January 1984, until his selection for the astronaut candidate program.

He has logged over 7,000 hours flying time in 20 different types of aircraft, including 345 carrier landings.

== NASA career ==
Wetherbee was selected as an astronaut candidate in 1984, and became an astronaut in June 1985. He piloted his first mission STS-32 in 1990 and commanded missions STS-52 (1992), STS-63 (1995), STS-86 (1997), STS-102 (2001), and STS-113 (2002). The final three missions were dockings with Mir and the International Space Station; STS-113 was the last Space Shuttle mission before the Columbia disaster.

Wetherbee served as deputy director of the Johnson Space Center (August 1995 to April 2000), Director of the Flight Crew Operations Directorate (April 2000 – 2002), and Technical Assistant to the Director of JSC's Safety & Mission Assurance Directorate (April 2003 to June 2004).

=== Spaceflight experience ===
STS-32: Columbia (January 9–20, 1990) included the successful deployment of the Syncom IV-F5 satellite, and retrieval of the 21,400-pound Long Duration Exposure Facility (LDEF) using the Remote Manipulator System (RMS). The crew also operated a variety of middeck experiments and conducted numerous medical test objectives, including in-flight aerobic exercise and muscle performance to evaluate human adaptation to extended duration missions. Mission duration was 173 orbits in 261 hours and 01 minute.

STS-52: Columbia (October 22 to November 1, 1992) successfully deployed the Laser Geodynamic Satellite (LAGEOS), a joint Italian-American project. The crew also operated the first U.S. Microgravity Payload (USMP) with French and American experiments, and successfully completed the initial flight tests of the Canadian-built Space Vision System (SVS). Mission duration was 236 hours and 56 minutes.

STS-63: Discovery (February 2–11, 1995) was the first joint flight of the new Russian-American Space Program. Mission highlights included the rendezvous with the Russian Space Station, Mir, operation of Spacehab, and the deployment and retrieval of Spartan 204. The mission was accomplished in 129 orbits in 198 hours and 29 minutes.

STS-86: Atlantis (September 25 to October 6, 1997) was the seventh mission to rendezvous and dock with the Russian Space Station Mir. Highlights included the delivery of a Mir attitude control computer, the exchange of U.S. crew members Mike Foale and David Wolf, a spacewalk by Scott Parazynski and Vladimir Titov to retrieve four experiments first deployed on Mir during the STS-76 docking mission, the transfer to Mir of 10,400 pounds of science and logistics, and the return of experiment hardware and results to Earth. Mission duration was 169 orbits in 259 hours and 21 minutes.

STS-102: Discovery (March 8–21, 2001) was the eighth Space Shuttle mission to visit the International Space Station. The mission accomplishments included the delivery of the Expedition 2 crew and the contents of the Leonardo Multi-Purpose Logistics Module, the completion of two successful spacewalks, the return to Earth of the Expedition 1 crew, as well as the return of Leonardo, the reusable cargo carrier built by the Italian Space Agency. Mission duration was 307 hours and 49 minutes.

STS-113: Endeavour (November 23 to December 7, 2002) was the sixteenth Space Shuttle mission to the International Space Station. The launch occurred on November 23, 2002, to deliver the P1 Truss segment, which provides structural support for the Space Station radiators. Endeavour also delivered a new Expedition 6 crew to the Station, returning to Earth on December 7, 2002, with the Expedition 5 crew ending their 6-month stay in space. The total mission duration was 13 days, 18 hours and 47 minutes.

== Post-NASA career ==
Wetherbee retired from the U.S. Navy in 2003 and left NASA in 2005 to become a consultant. He joined BP in 2006, as a safety auditor, and retired in 2014. He is currently working as a drummer and as a consultant for leaders in hazardous environments.

== Personal life ==
Wetherbee is married to Robin DeVore Platt of Jacksonville, Florida, and has two daughters. He currently resides in Oregon.

== Organizations ==
Lifetime Member of the Society of Experimental Test Pilots; Honorary Member, Musicians' Union, Local 47, American Federation of Musicians, Los Angeles, California.

== Awards and honors ==
- Distinguished Flying Cross
- Navy Achievement Medal
- two Meritorious Unit Commendations
- six NASA Space Flight Medals
- two NASA Outstanding Leadership Medals
- four NASA Distinguished Service Medals
- Lifetime Member of the Society of Experimental Test Pilots
- Honorary Member of the Musicians' Union, Local 47, American Federation of Musicians, Los Angeles, CA.
- Inducted into the Long Island Air and Space Hall of Fame in the Cradle of Aviation Museum, Garden City, NY.
- Inducted into the U.S. Astronaut Hall of Fame.

== Records ==
- Only American to have commanded five missions in space.
- Has landed the Space Shuttle more times than anyone (five).
- Was the tallest person to fly in space at 6 ft 4 in (1.93 m), until Michael Strahan flew to space onboard Blue Origin NS-19.

== See also ==
- List of spaceflight records
