= Paul Lockhart =

American test pilot, aeronautical engineer and astronaut (born 1956)

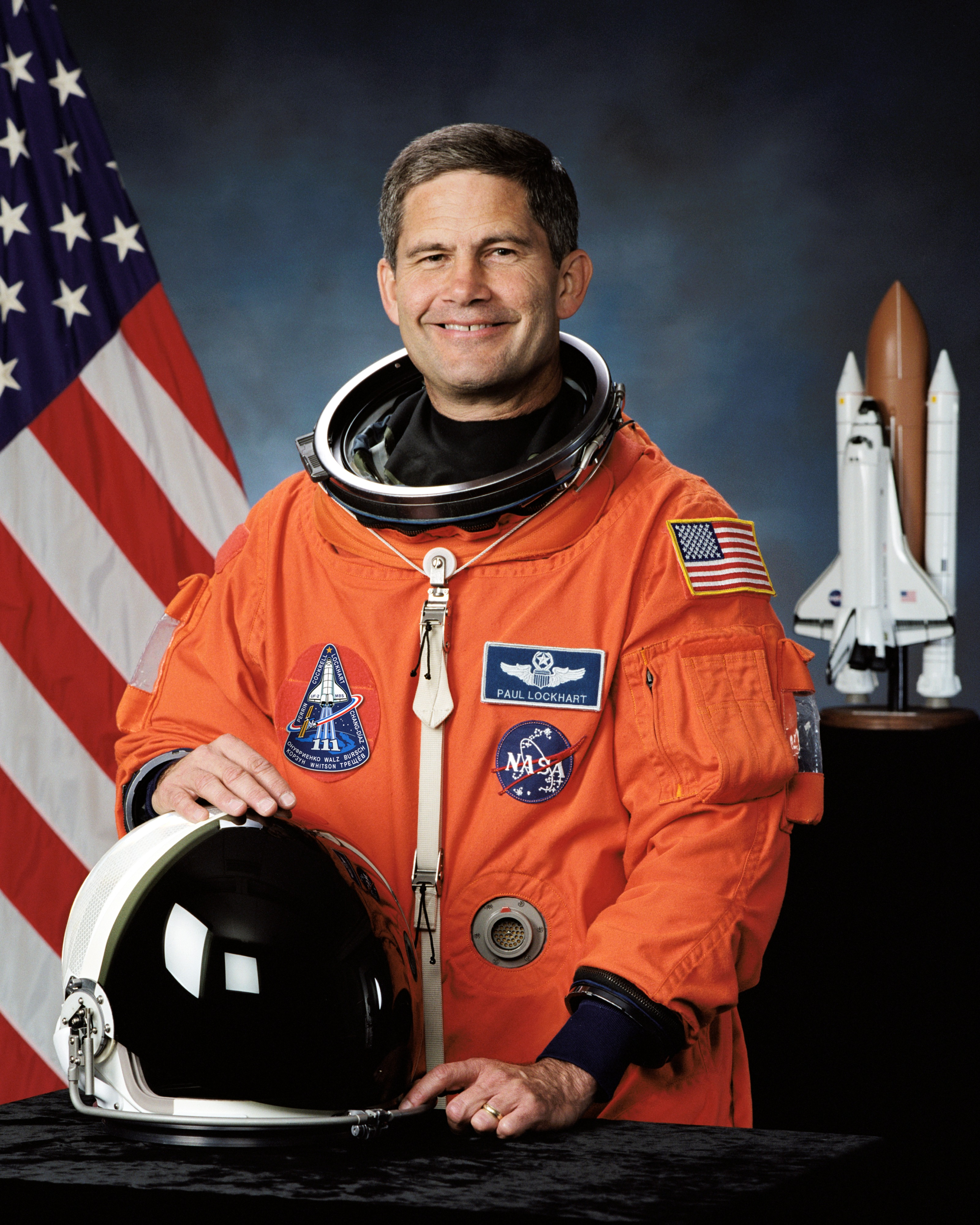
- Born: Paul Scott Lockhart; April 28, 1956 (age 70); Amarillo, Texas, U.S.
- Other name: Paco
- Education: Texas Tech University (BA); University of Texas, Austin (MS)
- Space career

NASA astronaut
- Rank: Colonel, USAF
- Time in space: 27d 15h 23m
- Selection: NASA Group 16 (1996)
- Missions: STS-111; STS-113
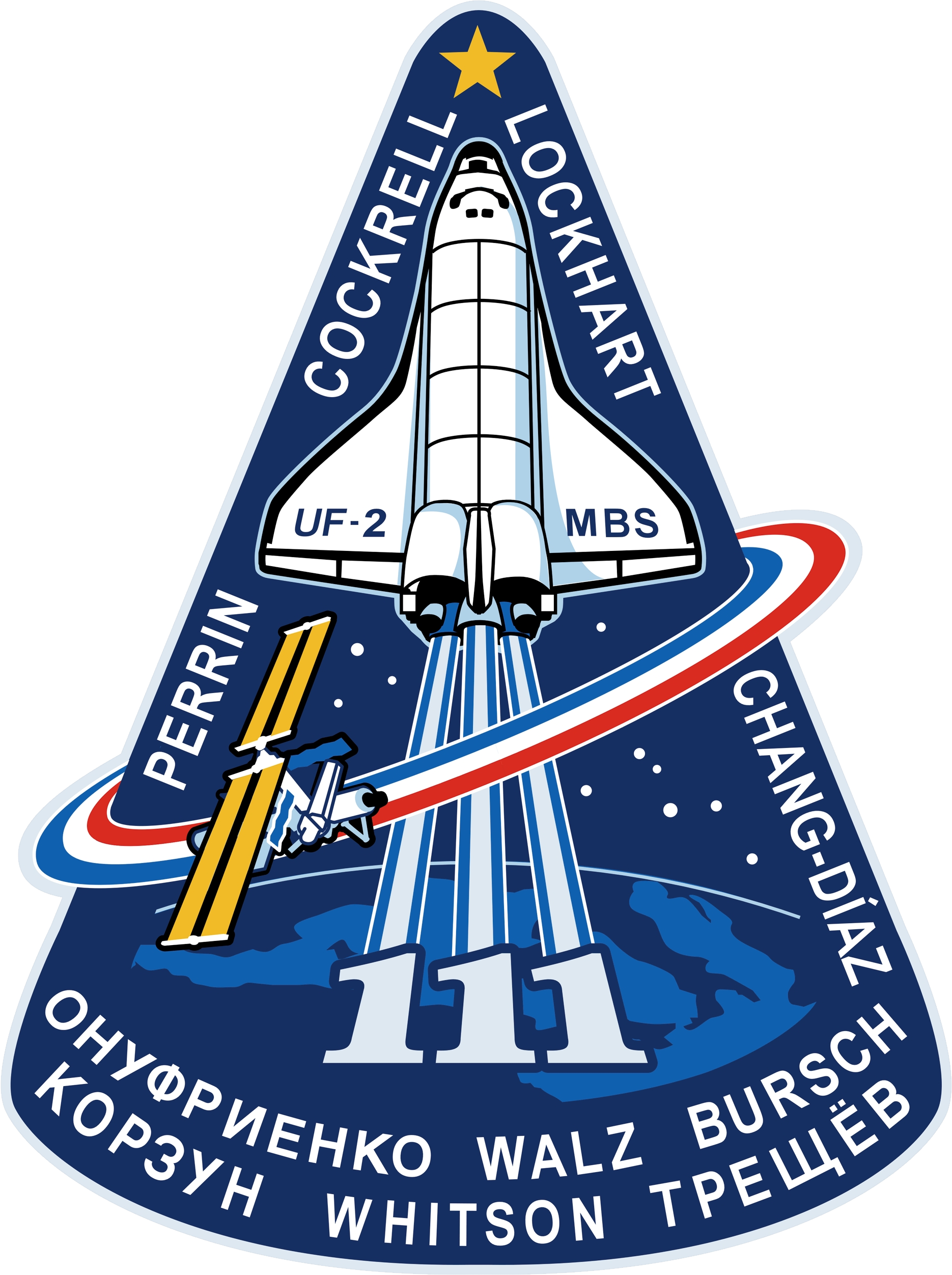
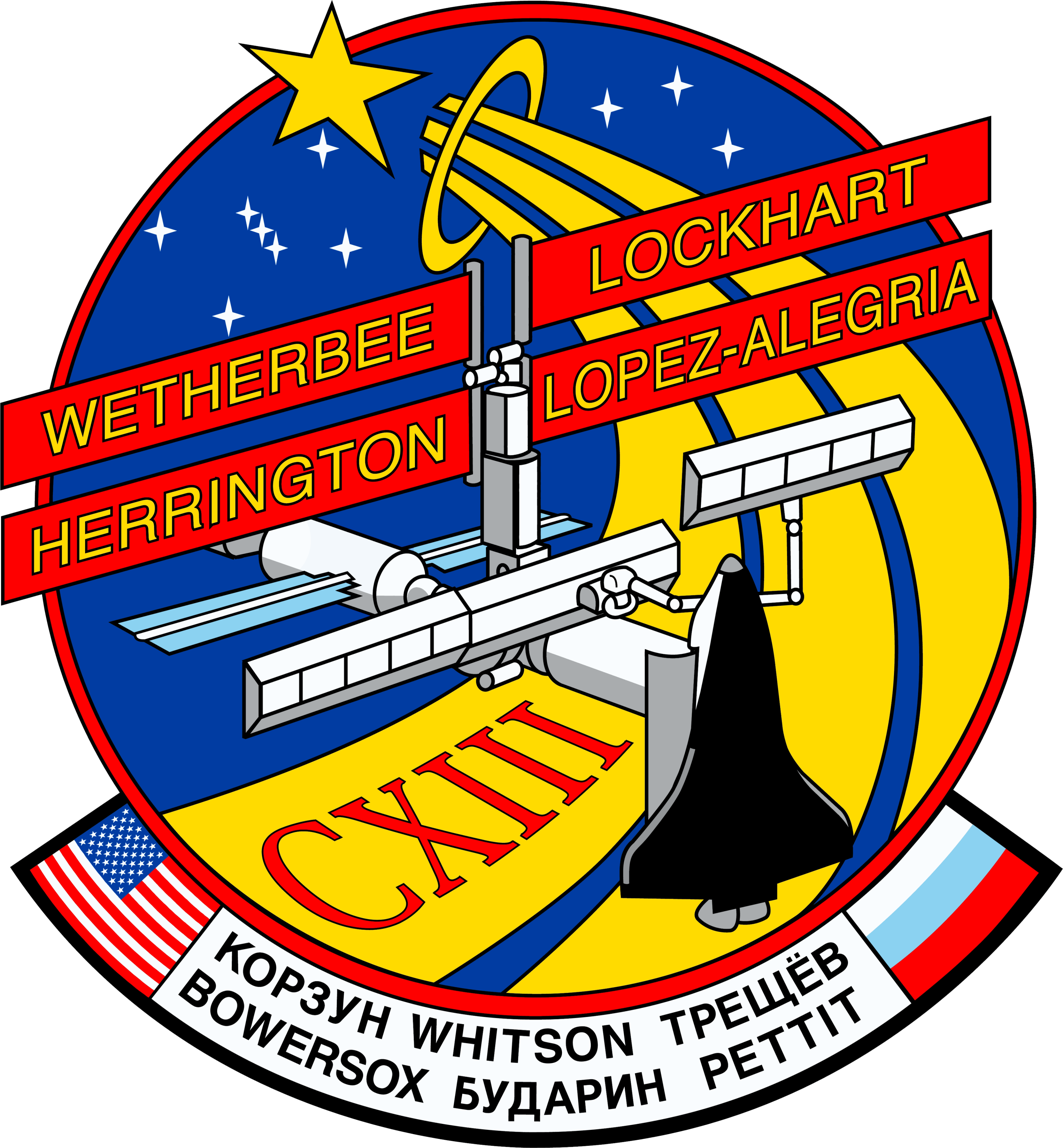
- Mission insignia

Paul Scott "Paco" Lockhart (born April 28, 1956) is an American aerospace engineer, retired United States Air Force colonel and NASA astronaut, a veteran of two Space Shuttle missions.

== Early life and education ==
Lockhart, born April 28, 1956, and reared in Amarillo, Texas, graduated from Tascosa High School in 1974. He received a Bachelor of Arts degree in mathematics from Texas Tech University in 1978, and a Master of Science degree in aerospace engineering from University of Texas at Austin before being commissioned in 1981 into the United States Air Force. He studied at the University of Innsbruck and the University of Vienna Summer School from 1978 to 1979 on a Rotarian Fellowship. He has completed aerospace-related courses from Syracuse University and the University of Florida. He is a distinguished graduate of both ROTC and the Air Force Squadron Officer School.

== Military service ==
Upon graduation from pilot training in 1983, Lockhart was assigned to the 49th Fighter Interceptor Squadron flying T-33s. In 1986, he transitioned to the F-4 and flew operationally with U.S. Air Forces, Europe (in Germany) from 1987 to 1990 as an instructor pilot for F-4 and F-16 aircrew in the tactics of surface-to-air missile suppression. In 1991 he reported to Edwards Air Force Base, California, for year long training as a test pilot in high performance military aircraft. Upon graduation, he was assigned to the Test Wing at the Air Force Developmental Test Center at Eglin Air Force Base, Florida, performing weapons testing for the F-16 aircraft. During his 4 1/2-year tour at Eglin, he was selected as the operations officer for the 39th Flight Test Squadron. Much of America's state-of-the-art weaponry was first tested under his guidance at the 39th Flight Test Squadron.

He has logged over 5,000 flying hours in more than 30 different aircraft and the Space Shuttle.

After his service with NASA, Lockhart was assigned to and graduated in 2004 from the Royal College of Defence Studies in London, United Kingdom. His last military assignment was with the headquarters Air Force, A9, where he was a directorate chief for both the force structures and the analyses and assessments branch. Lockhart retired from the U.S. Air Force in January 2007 and returned to NASA in an administrative position.

== NASA career ==
A test pilot for the F-16 aircraft, Lockhart was selected as an astronaut candidate in 1996. Lockhart's two space missions, STS-111 and STS-113, both in 2002, were missions to the International Space Station. He was assigned to STS-113 as pilot after the resignation of Christopher Loria from the NASA Astronaut Corps due to an injury.

== Organizations ==
- Society of Experimental Test Pilots
- Order of Daedalians (Fraternal Order of Military Pilots).

== Awards and decorations ==
- Defense Superior Service Medal
- Defense Meritorious Service Medal
- Air Force Aerial Achievement Medal
- Air Force Commendation Medal
- Outstanding Unit Award with Valor
- National Defense Service Medal
- Air Force Achievement Medal, and numerous other service recognitions and ribbons.
