= STS-113 =

2002 American crewed spaceflight to the ISS

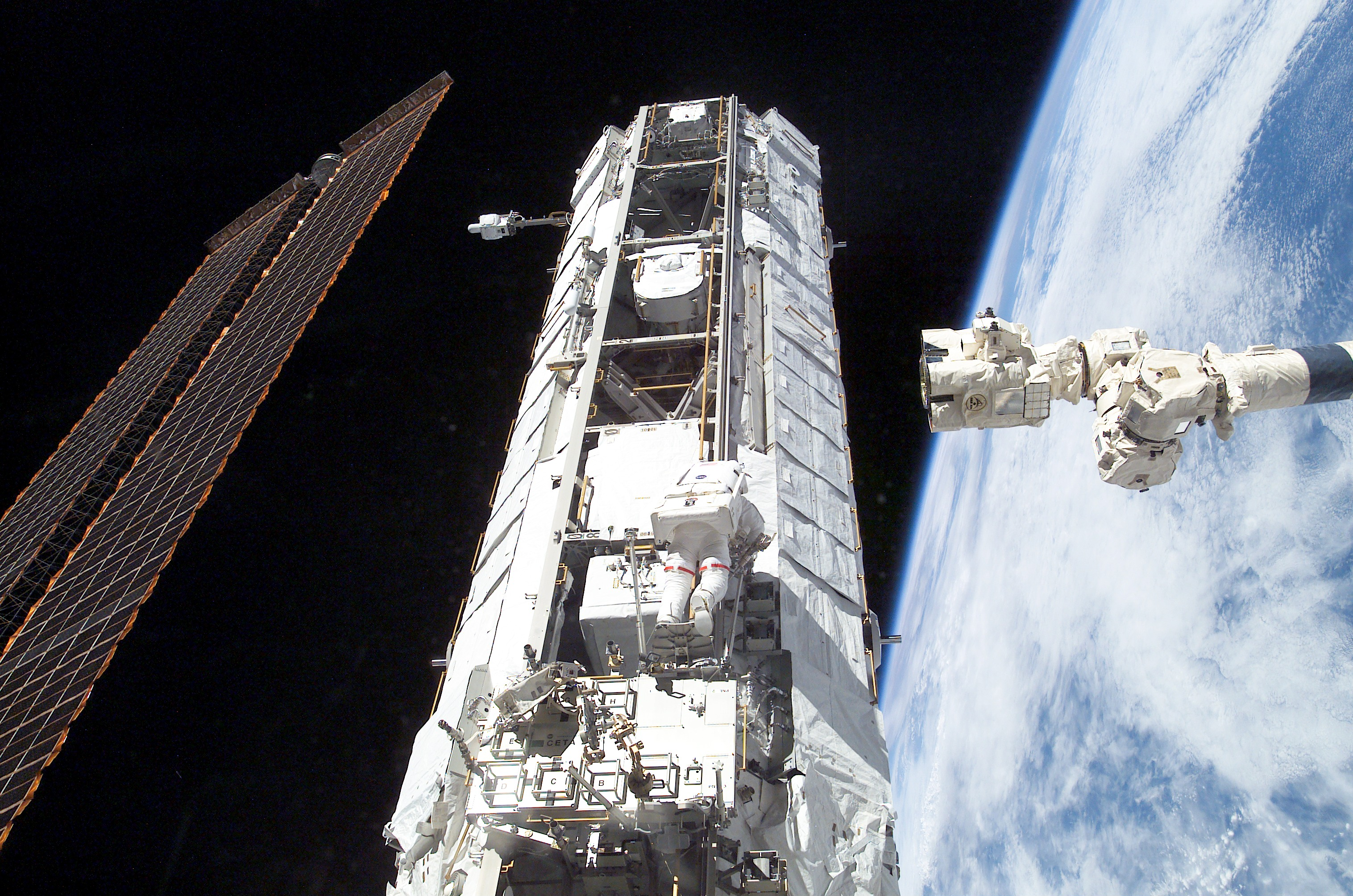
- Astronaut Michael López-Alegría climbs the newly-installed P1 truss during the mission's second EVA
- Names: Space Transportation System-113
- Mission type: ISS assembly Crew rotation
- Operator: NASA
- COSPAR ID: 2002-052A
- SATCAT no.: 27556
- Mission duration: 13 days, 18 hours, 48 minutes, 38 seconds
- Distance travelled: 9,000,000 kilometres (5,600,000 mi)

Spacecraft properties
- Spacecraft: Space Shuttle Endeavour
- Launch mass: 116,460 kilograms (256,750 lb)
- Landing mass: 91,498 kilograms (201,719 lb)
- Payload mass: 12,477 kilograms (27,507 lb)

Crew
- Crew size: 7
- Members: James D. Wetherbee; Paul S. Lockhart; Michael López-Alegría; John B. Herrington
- Launching: Kenneth D. Bowersox; Nikolai M. Budarin; Donald R. Pettit
- Landing: Valery G. Korzun; Peggy A. Whitson; Sergey Y. Treshchov

Start of mission
- Launch date: 24 November 2002, 00:49:47 UTC
- Launch site: Kennedy, LC-39A

End of mission
- Landing date: 7 December 2002, 19:38:25 UTC
- Landing site: Kennedy, SLF Runway 33

Orbital parameters
- Reference system: Geocentric
- Regime: Low Earth
- Perigee altitude: 379 kilometres (235 mi)
- Apogee altitude: 397 kilometres (247 mi)
- Inclination: 51.6 degrees
- Period: 92.3 min

Docking with ISS
- Docking port: PMA-2 (Destiny forward)
- Docking date: 25 November 2002, 21:59 UTC
- Undocking date: 2 December 2002, 20:50 UTC
- Time docked: 6 days, 22 hours, 51 minutes
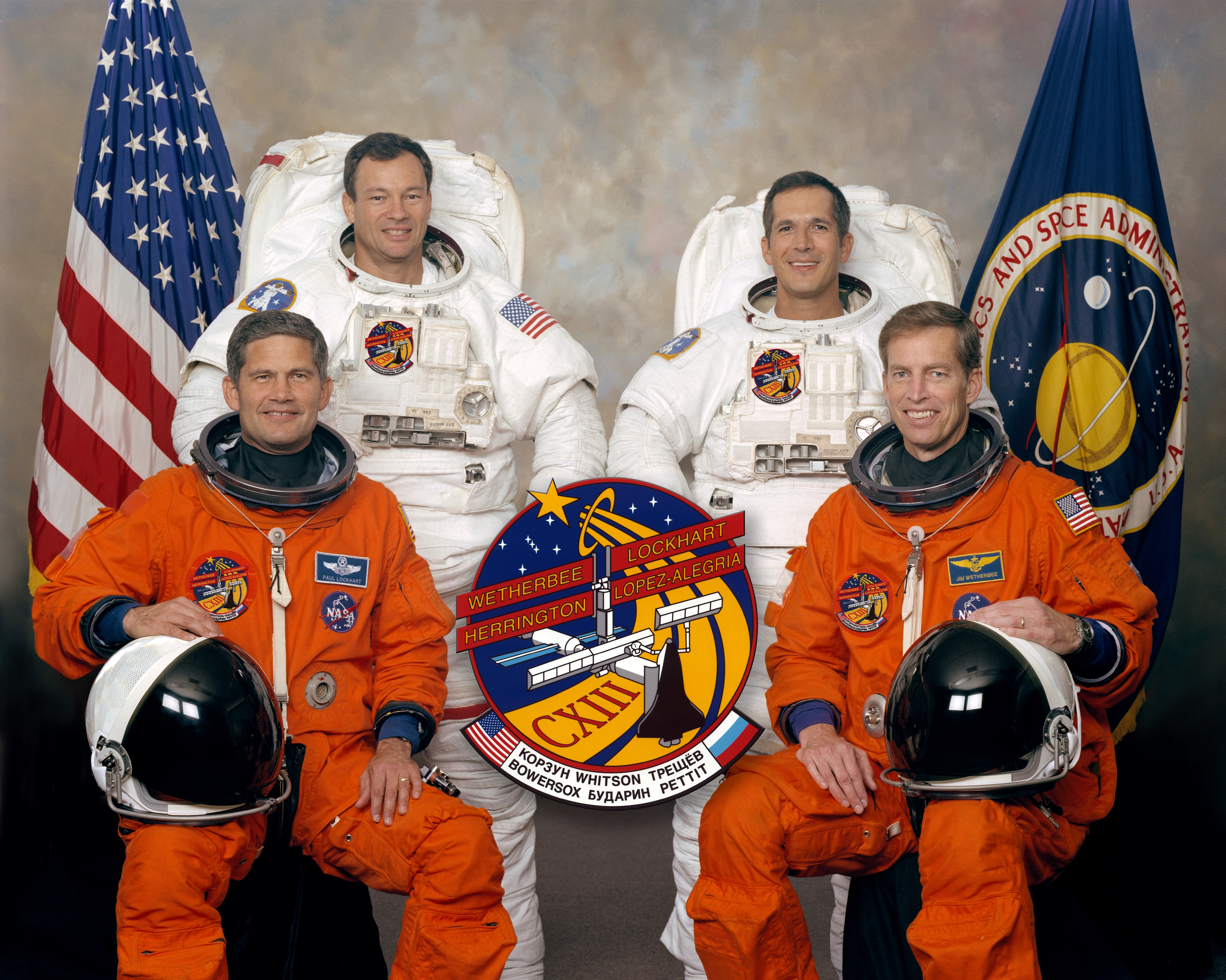
- (L-R): Paul S. Lockhart, Michael E. López-Alegría, John B. Herrington, and James D. Wetherbee Space Shuttle program

STS-113 was a Space Shuttle mission to the International Space Station (ISS) flown by Space Shuttle Endeavour. During the 14-day mission in late 2002, Endeavour and its crew extended the ISS backbone with the P1 truss and exchanged the Expedition 5 and Expedition 6 crews aboard the station. With commander Jim Wetherbee and pilot Paul Lockhart at the controls, Endeavour docked with the station on 25 November 2002 to begin seven days of station assembly, spacewalks, and crew and equipment transfers. This was the last flight of Endeavour before entering its Orbiter Major Modification period until STS-118 in 2007, which included modernizing the cockpit, and also the final shuttle mission before the Columbia disaster.

== Crew ==
Position	Launching Astronaut	Landing Astronaut
Commander	(United States) James D. Wetherbee; Sixth and last spaceflight	
Pilot	(United States) Paul S. Lockhart; Second and last spaceflight	
Mission Specialist 1	(United States) Michael López-Alegría; Third spaceflight	
Mission Specialist 2 Flight Engineer	(United States) John B. Herrington; Only spaceflight	
Mission Specialist 3	(United States) Kenneth D. Bowersox; Expedition 6 Fifth and last spaceflight ISS Commander	(Russia) Valery G. Korzun, RKA; Expedition 5 Second and last spaceflight ISS Commander/Soyuz Commander
Mission Specialist 4	(Russia) Nikolai M. Budarin, RKA; Expedition 6 Third and last spaceflight ISS Flight Engineer/Soyuz Commander	(United States) Peggy A. Whitson; Expedition 5 First spaceflight ISS Flight Engineer
Mission Specialist 5	(United States) Donald R. Pettit; Expedition 6 First spaceflight ISS Flight Engineer	(Russia) Sergey Y. Treshchov, RKA; Expedition 5 Only spaceflight ISS Flight Engineer

== Mission highlights ==
STS-113 was an Assembly Mission (11A) to the International Space Station, delivering the P1 Truss segment, which provides structural support for the Space Station radiators. Mission Specialists John Herrington and Michael López-Alegría performed three spacewalks to activate and outfit the P1. The STS-113 crew and both Expedition crews transferred about 1,969 kilograms (4,340 pounds) of cargo between the shuttle and station.

STS-113 delivered the Expedition 6 crew to the station for a four-month increment. The Expedition 5 crew returned to Earth aboard STS-113, ending a 185-day stay in space.

STS-113 came to a close when Endeavour glided in to a landing at Kennedy Space Center on 7 December. It was the 19th flight of Endeavour, the 112th shuttle mission, and the 16th shuttle mission to the station. The landing was the first (and only) time a mission ended on the fourth day of landing attempts.

Also carried aboard STS-113 was the Micro-Electromechanical System (MEMS) based Pico Satellite Inspector (MEPSI). This payload deployed two small satellites which are connected via a 15 metres (49 ft) tether.

STS-113 was the last successful mission before STS-107. Gus Loria was originally scheduled to fly as the pilot for this mission, but was replaced due to an injury. His replacement was Paul S. Lockhart. John Herrington, a member of the Chickasaw Nation, became the first enrolled member of a Native American tribe to fly in space. (Note: William R. Pogue was of Choctaw ancestry and was a crewman aboard Skylab 4 in 1973–1974, but he was not an enrolled member of the Choctaw.)

STS-113 was the final mission during which Russian cosmonauts flew on the Space Shuttle.

Because Endeavour entered its Orbiter Major Modification period after the Columbia disaster, this was the last shuttle mission to fly with an analog-style cockpit.

Attempt	Planned	Result	Turnaround	Reason	Decision point	Weather go (%)	Notes
1	11 Nov 2002, 12:58:40 am	Scrubbed	—	Technical	10 Nov 2002, 9:00 pm	90%	Problems with an oxygen system in the orbiter's midbody.
2	22 Nov 2002, 8:15:30 pm	Scrubbed	11 days 19 hours 17 minutes	Weather	22 Nov 2002, 8:05 pm (T−00:09:00 hold)	90%	Weather at TAL sites Zaragoza and Moron, Spain.
3	23 Nov 2002, 7:49:47 pm	Success	0 days 23 hours 34 minutes			95%	Initial weather reports for TAL sites was not favorable but cleared in time for launch.

== Mission parameters ==
=== Docking with ISS ===
- Docked: 25 November 2002, 21:59:00 UTC
- Undocked: 2 December 2002, 20:50:00 UTC
- Time Docked: 6 days, 22 h, 51 min, 00 s

=== Crew seat assignments ===
Seat	Launch	Landing	Seats 1–4 are on the flight deck. Seats 5–7 are on the mid-deck.
1	Wetherbee		Seats 1–4 are on the flight deck. Seats 5–7 are on the mid-deck.
2	Lockhart		Seats 1–4 are on the flight deck. Seats 5–7 are on the mid-deck.
3	Lopez-Alegria	Unused	Seats 1–4 are on the flight deck. Seats 5–7 are on the mid-deck.
4	Herrington		Seats 1–4 are on the flight deck. Seats 5–7 are on the mid-deck.
5	Bowersox	Lopez-Alegria	Seats 1–4 are on the flight deck. Seats 5–7 are on the mid-deck.
6	Pettit	Whitson	Seats 1–4 are on the flight deck. Seats 5–7 are on the mid-deck.
7	Budarin	Korzun	Seats 1–4 are on the flight deck. Seats 5–7 are on the mid-deck.
8	Unused	Treshchov	

=== Spacewalks ===
	Mission	Spacewalkers	Start – UTC	End – UTC	Duration	Mission
47.	STS-113; EVA 1	Michael López-Alegría; John Herrington	26 November 2002; 19:49	27 November 2002; 02:34	6 h, 45 min	Install P1 truss
48.	STS-113; EVA 2	Michael López-Alegría; John Herrington	28 November 2002; 18:36	29 November 2002; 00:46	6 h, 10 min	Install TV cameras, move CETA
49.	STS-113; EVA 3	Michael López-Alegría; John Herrington	30 November 2002; 19:25	1 December 2002; 02:25	7 h, 00 min	Inspect Mobile Transporter

== Gallery ==
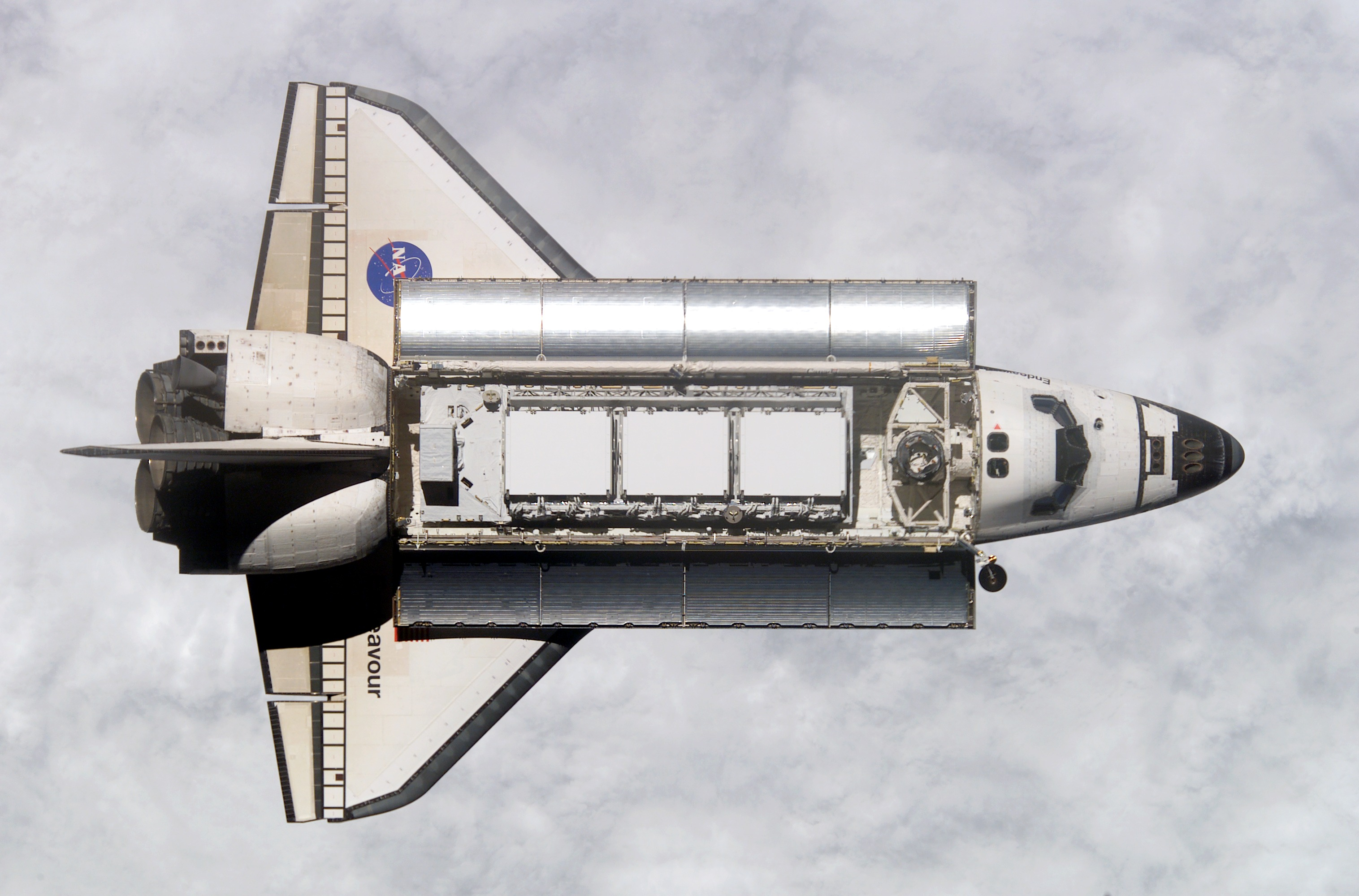
Endeavour with the P1 Truss segment in its payload bay

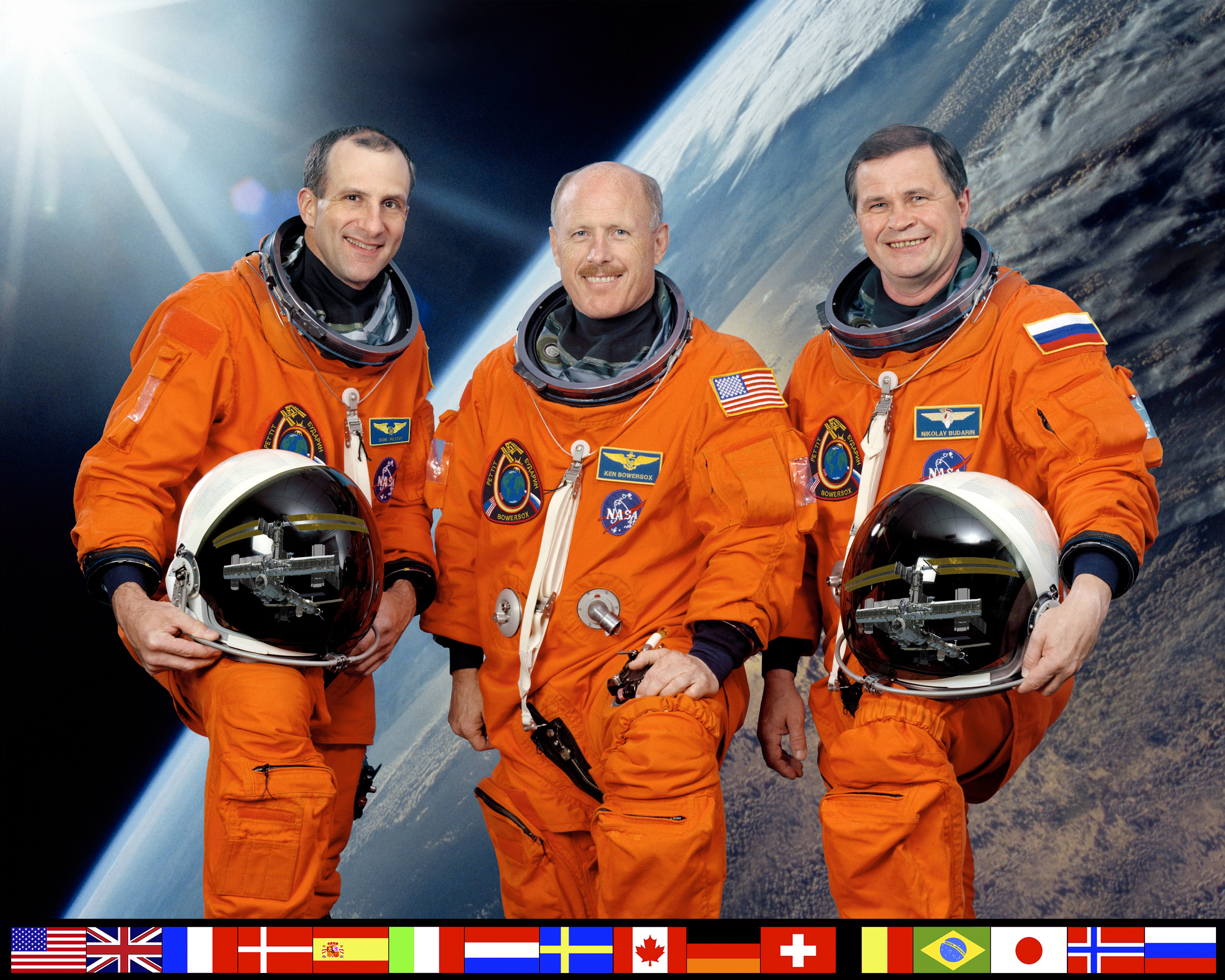
Launched Expedition 6 crew
L-R: Donald Pettit, Ken Bowersox and Nikolai Budarin

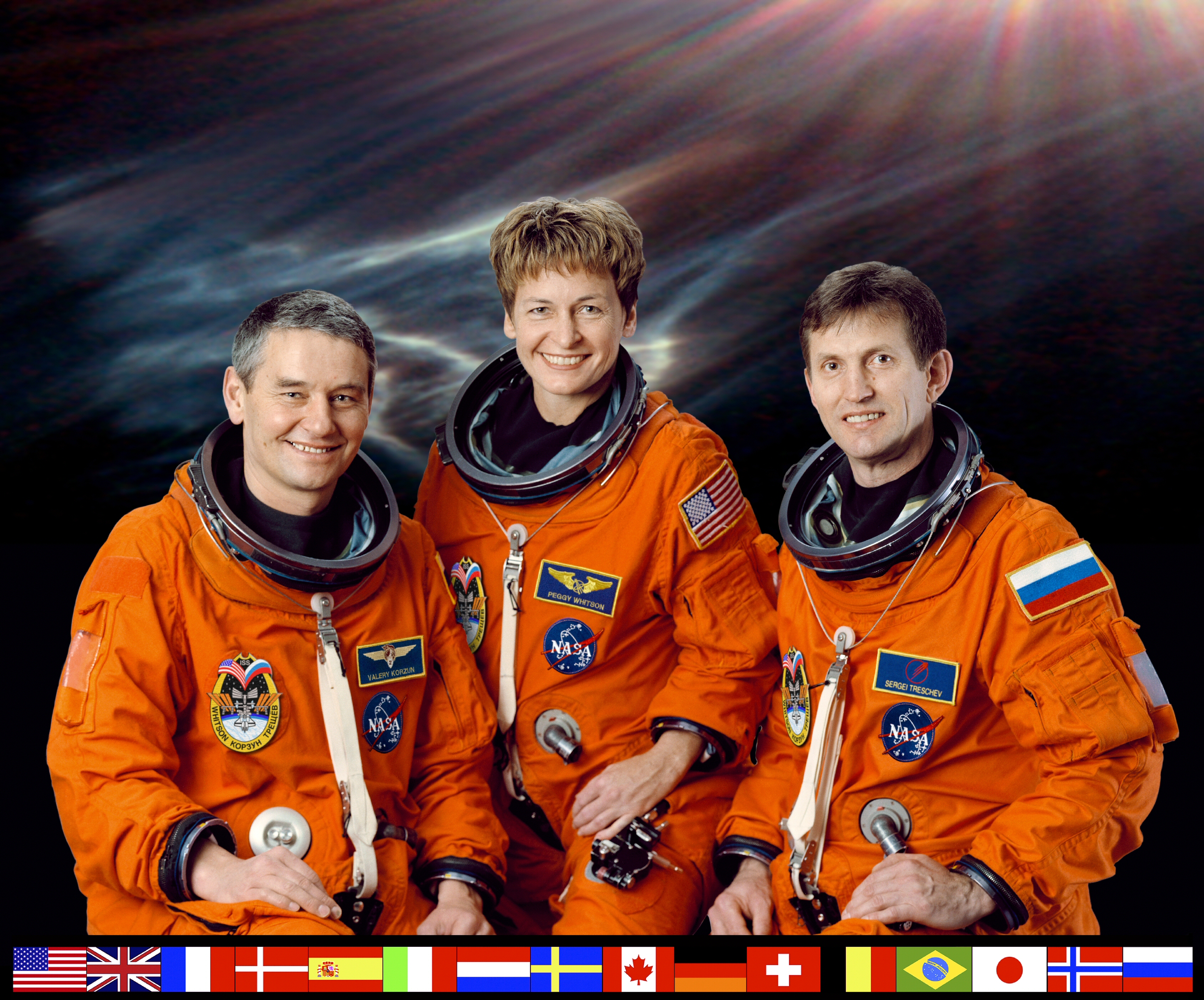
Landed Expedition 5 crew
L-R: Valery G. Korzun, Peggy Whitson, and Sergey Y. Treshchev

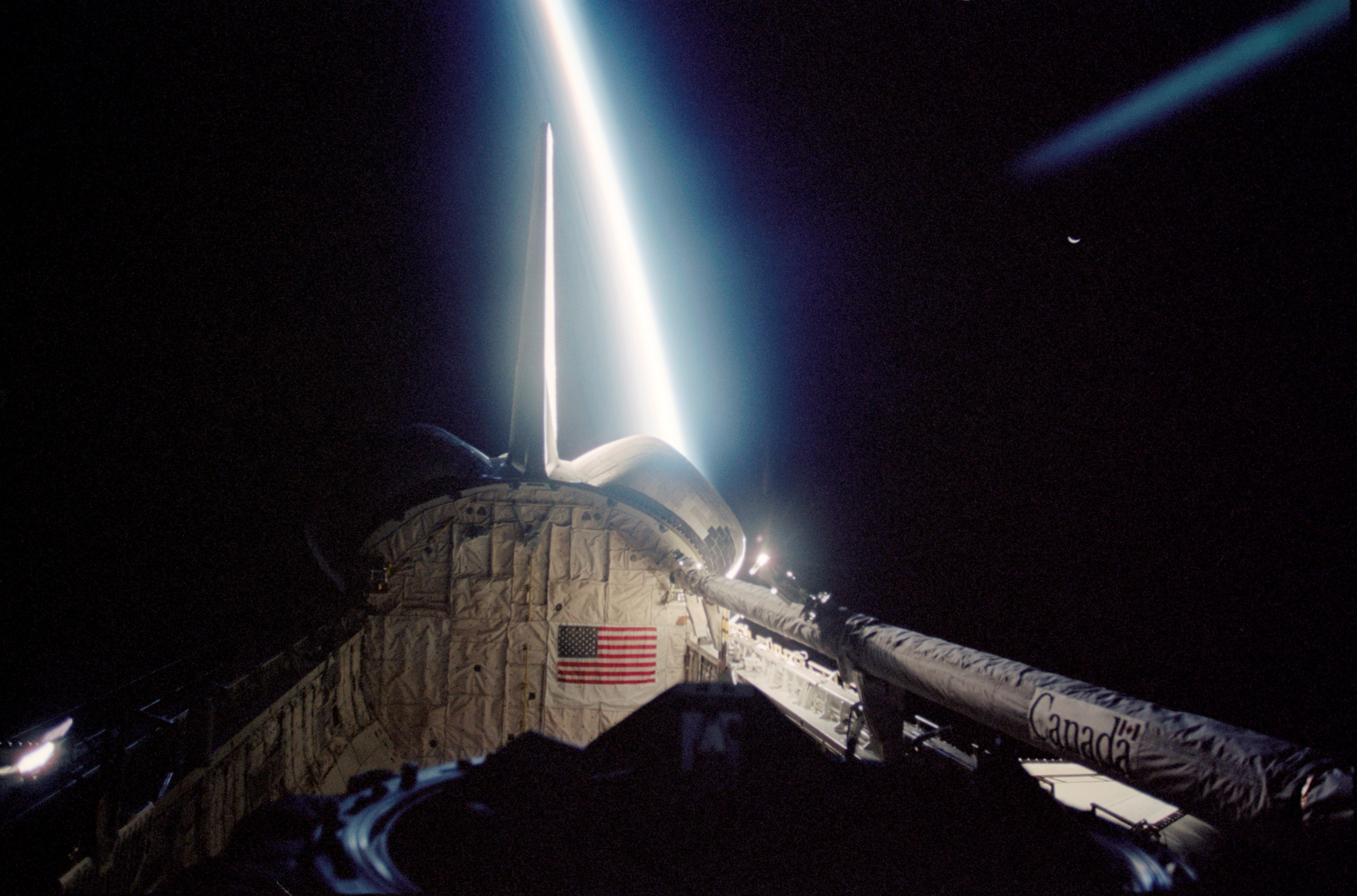
View of Earth's horizon at sunrise as seen from Endeavour on STS-113.

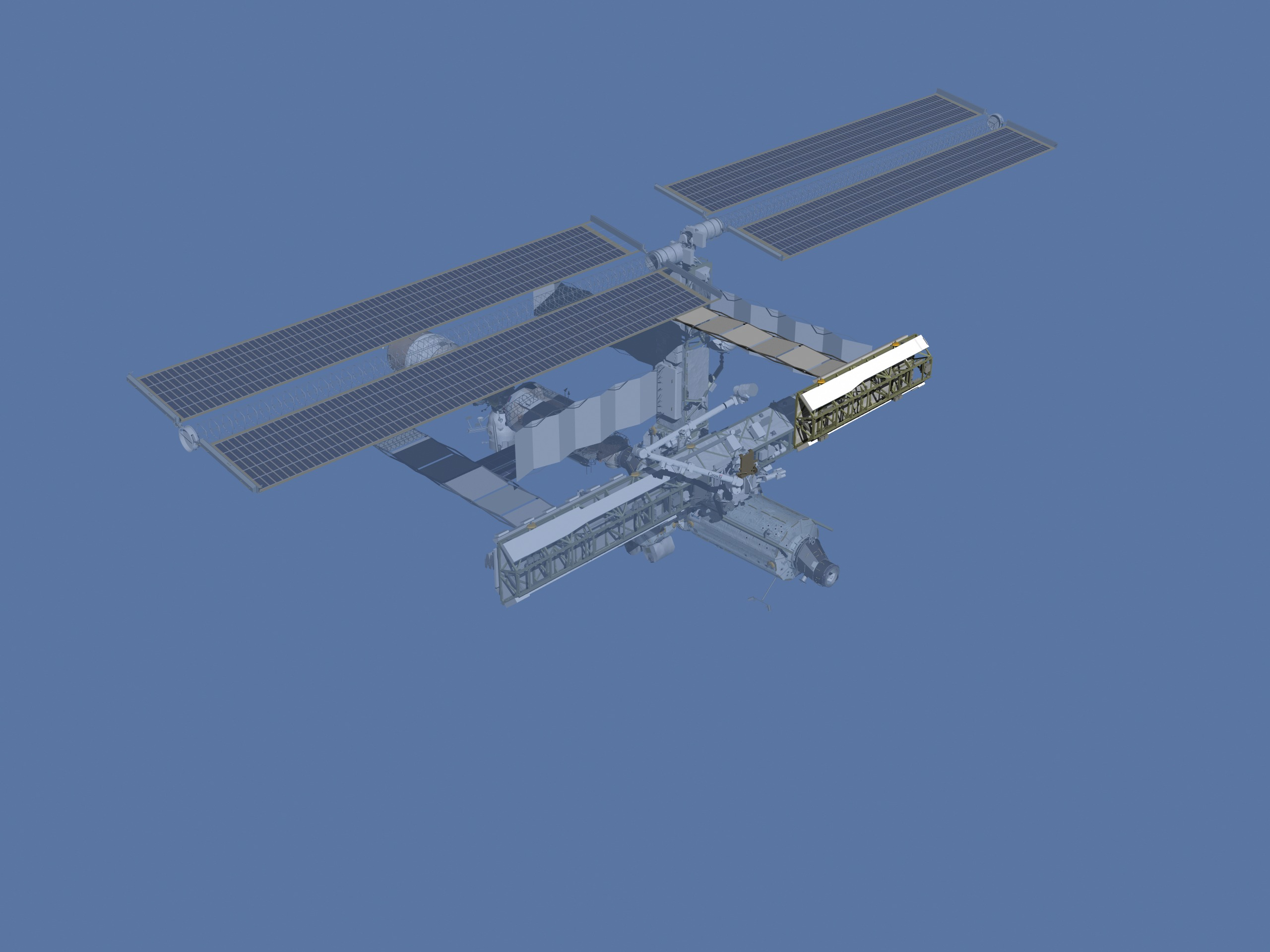
Illustration of the International Space Station after STS-113

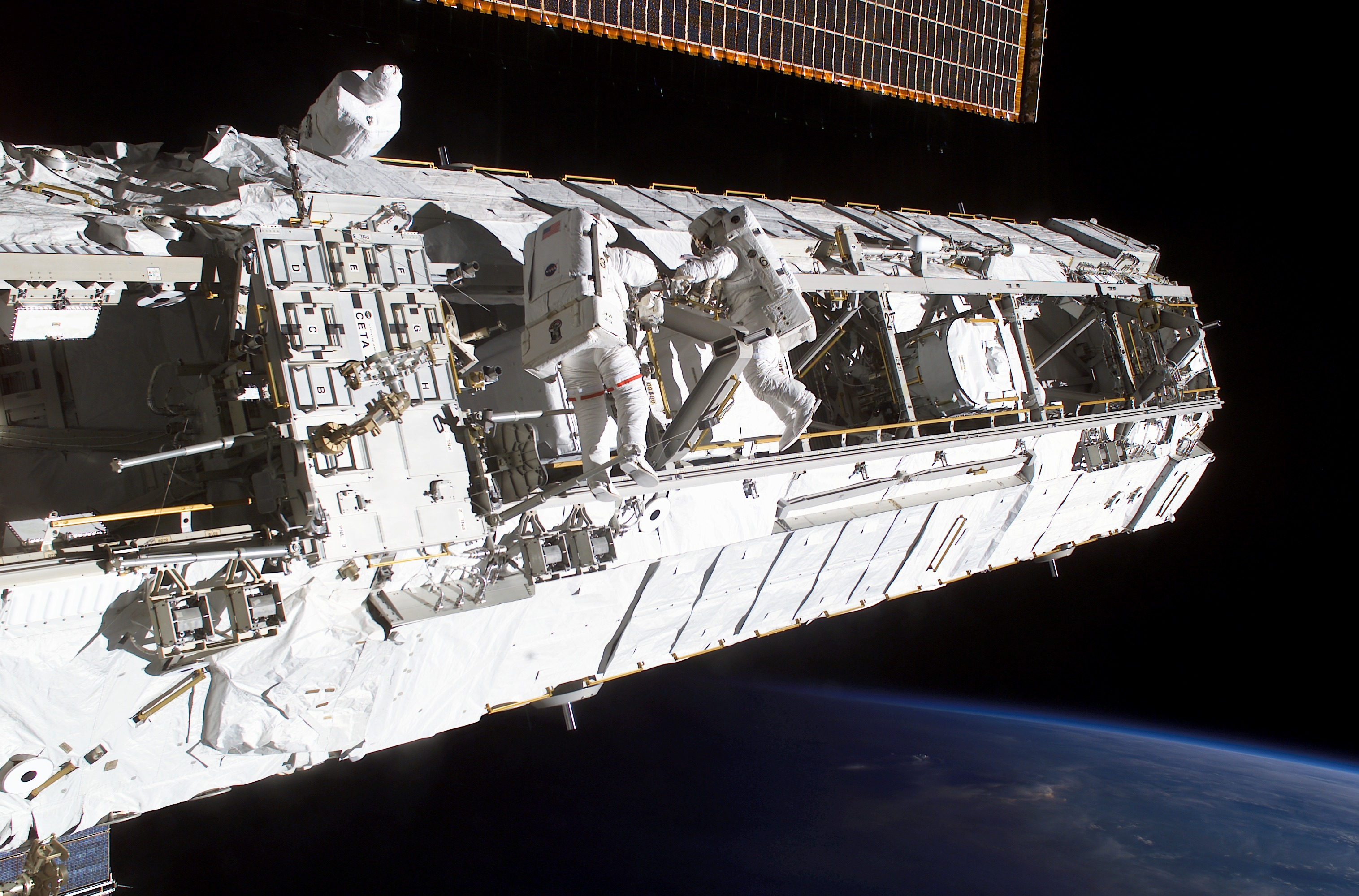
López-Alegría and Herrington installing the P1 Truss segment

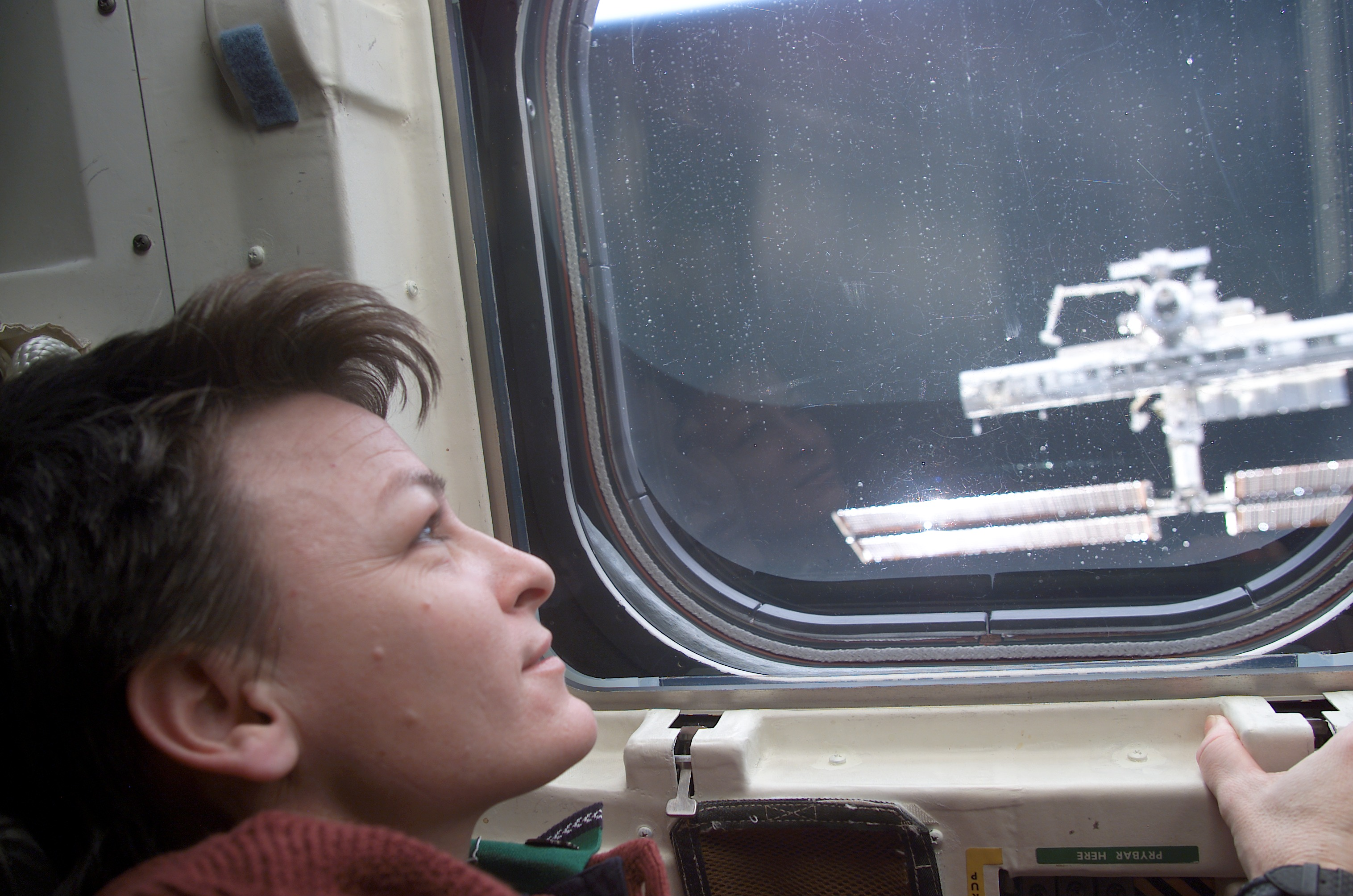
Whitson viewing the ISS after undocking

== See also ==
- List of human spaceflights
- List of International Space Station spacewalks
- List of Space Shuttle missions
- List of spacewalks and moonwalks 1965–1999
- Outline of space science
