= Sergey Treshchov =

Russian cosmonaut (born 1958)

- Сергей Трещëв
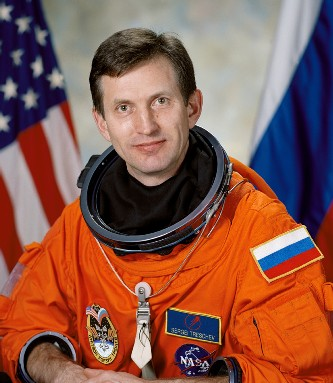
- Born: August 18, 1958 (age 68); Krasnuy Kustar, Lipetsk Oblast, Russian SFSR, Soviet Union
- Occupation: Pilot
- Space career

Roscosmos cosmonaut
- Status: Retired
- Time in space: 184d 22h 15m
- Selection: 1992 NPOE Cosmonaut Group
- Total EVAs: 1
- Total EVA time: 5h, 21m
- Missions: STS-111/113 (Expedition 5)
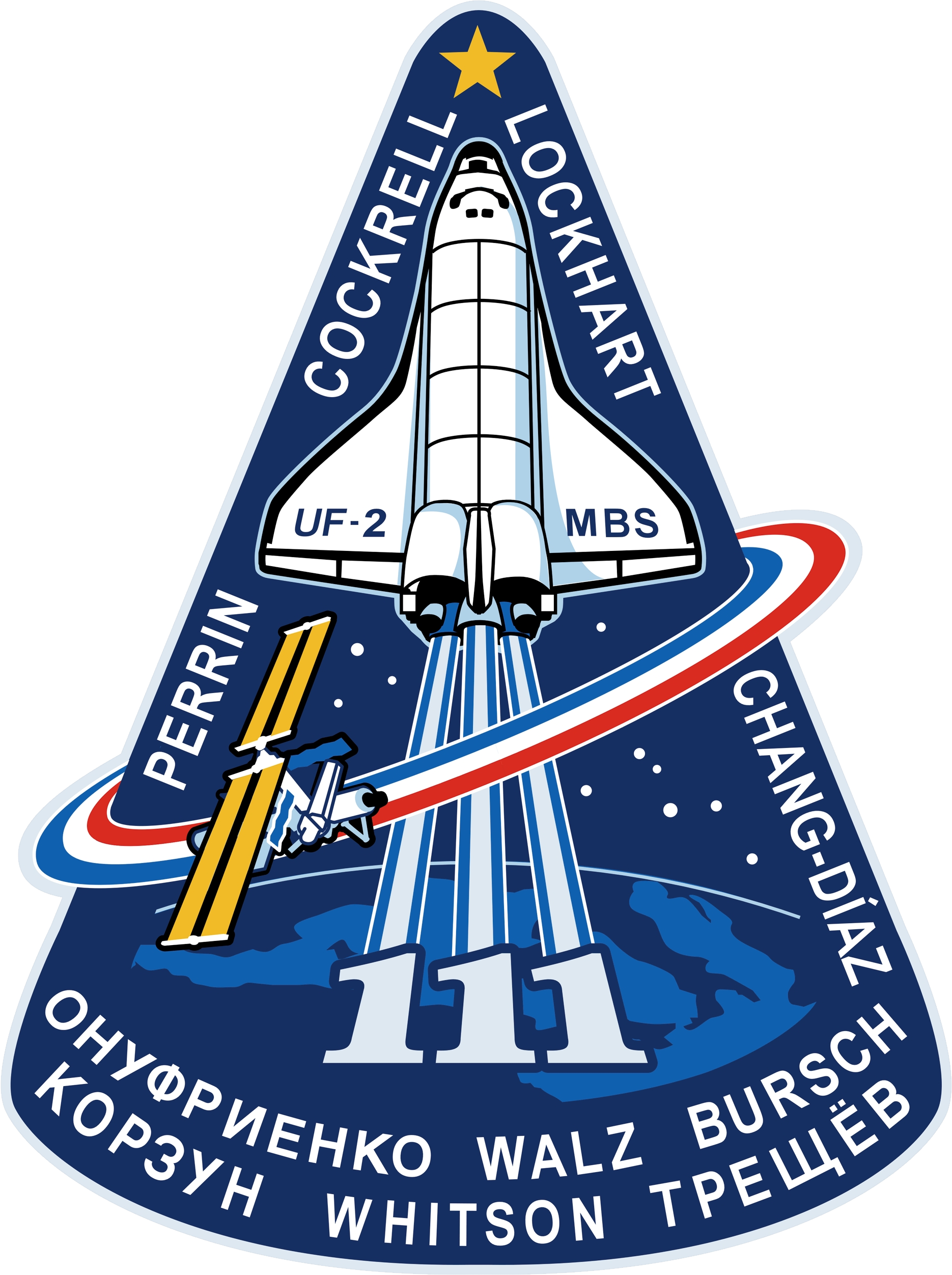
- Mission insignia

Sergey Yevgenyevich Treshchov (Russian: Сергей Евгеньевич Трещёв; born 18 August 1958) is a former cosmonaut of the RSC Energia. He spent 184 days in space as a flight engineer of the International Space Station long duration Expedition 5 crew. During the mission he also conducted a spacewalk.

== Personal ==
Treshchov was born in Volynsky District, in the Lipetsk Region of Russia. His father is Evgueniy Georgievich Treshchov, his mother is Nina Davydovna Treshchova. Treshchov and his wife, Elvira Viktorovna Treshchova have two sons, Dmitriy born in 1988 and Aleksey born in 1992. His hobbies include soccer, volleyball, ice hockey, hiking, tennis, music, photography, and video.

== Education ==
In 1976 Treshchov graduated from technical school as an electric welder. In 1982 he graduated from the Moscow Power Institute specializing in "engineer-teacher of electrical power disciplines".

== Experience ==
From 1982 to 1984, Treschov served as a group leader in an Air force regiment. He worked as a foreman and as an engineer at the RSC Energia from 1984 to 1986. His responsibilities included the analysis and planning of cosmonaut activities aboard a space station and their inflight technical training. He also developed technical documentation and, together with the Yuri Gagarin Cosmonaut Training Center, coordinated all facets of cosmonaut training. His duties also included crew support and training for descent and emergency escape scenarios aboard the Mir space station. He also participated as a test operator during tests of the ground-based complex to optimize the Life Support System of ЭУ367/734.

== Cosmonaut career ==
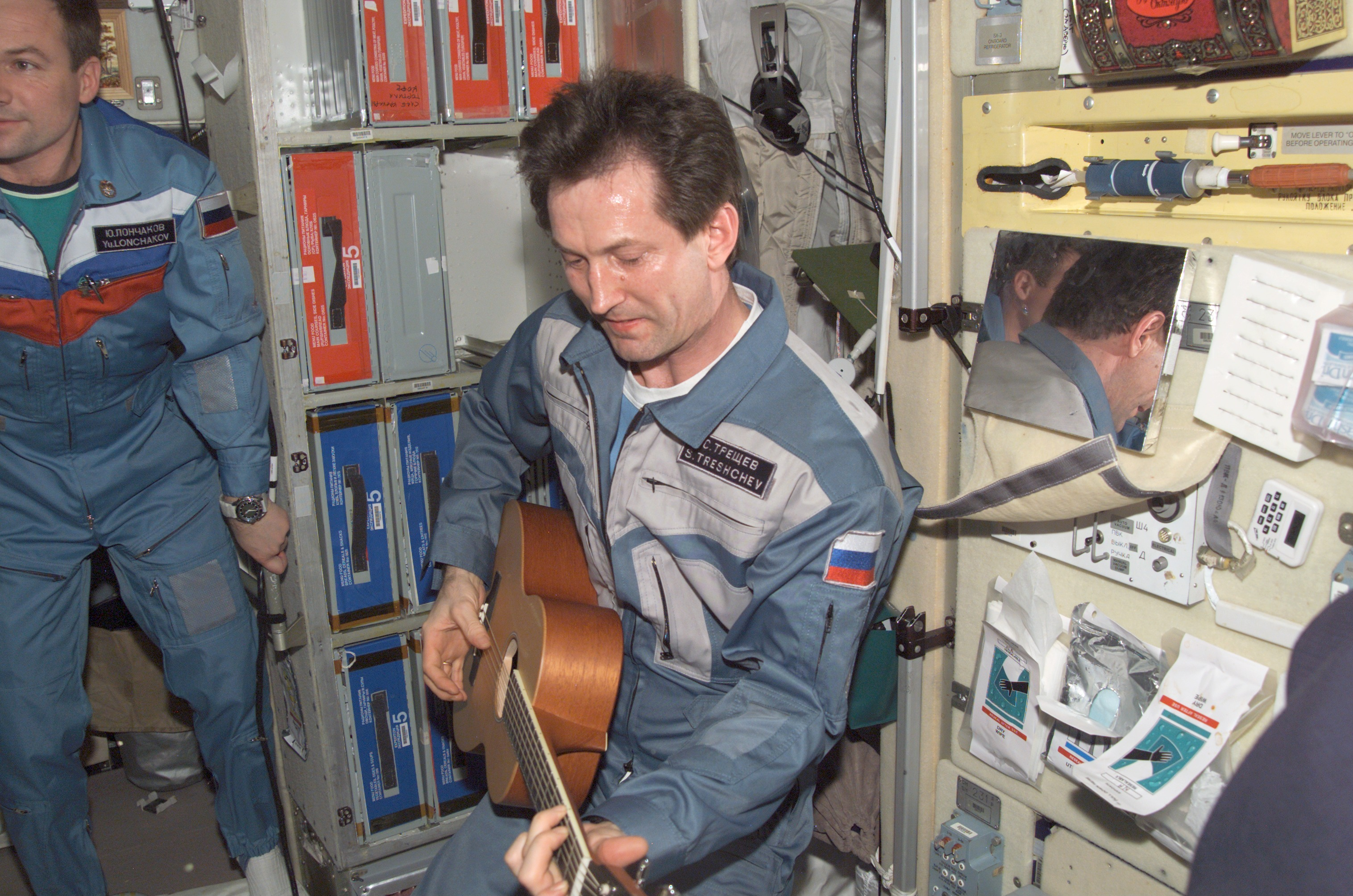
Sergei Treshchov plays a guitar in the Zvezda Module on the ISS.

In 1992, he enrolled in the RSC Energia cosmonaut detachment, and from 1992 to 1994 he completed the basic Cosmonaut training course. Treshchov spent the next 3 years (1994 to 1996) in advanced Test Cosmonaut training.

From June 1997 to February 1998, Treshchov trained as a flight engineer for the Mir station backup Exp-25 crew. From June 1999 to July 2000 he trained as a flight engineer for the Soyuz-TM backup ISS contingency crew. Initially, he trained as backup to the ISS Expedition 3 crew.

=== Expedition 5 ===
The Expedition 5 crew was launched on June 5, 2002, aboard STS-111. Space Shuttle Endeavour lifted off from the Kennedy Space Center LC-39A at 21:22:49 UTC. After two days Endeavour docked with the International Space Station (ISS) on June 7, 2002, at 16:25 UTC. Treshchov joined the Expedition 5 crew as a flight engineer. The Expedition 5 crew carried out approximately 25 new investigations on board the ISS, as well as continued with various science investigations begun before their stay. The scientific investigations aimed at studying cold plasma, crystal growth, radiation effects in the space and the human body. Some medical experiments involved blood, muscles, bones while the crew also conducted psychological experiments.

The Expedition 5 crew returned to Earth on December 7, 2002, aboard Space Shuttle Endeavour's STS-113 mission. The shuttle touched down at KSC Runway 33 at 19:38:25 UTC. Completing his second long duration spaceflight, Treshchev logged 184 days, 22 hours and 15 minutes in space.

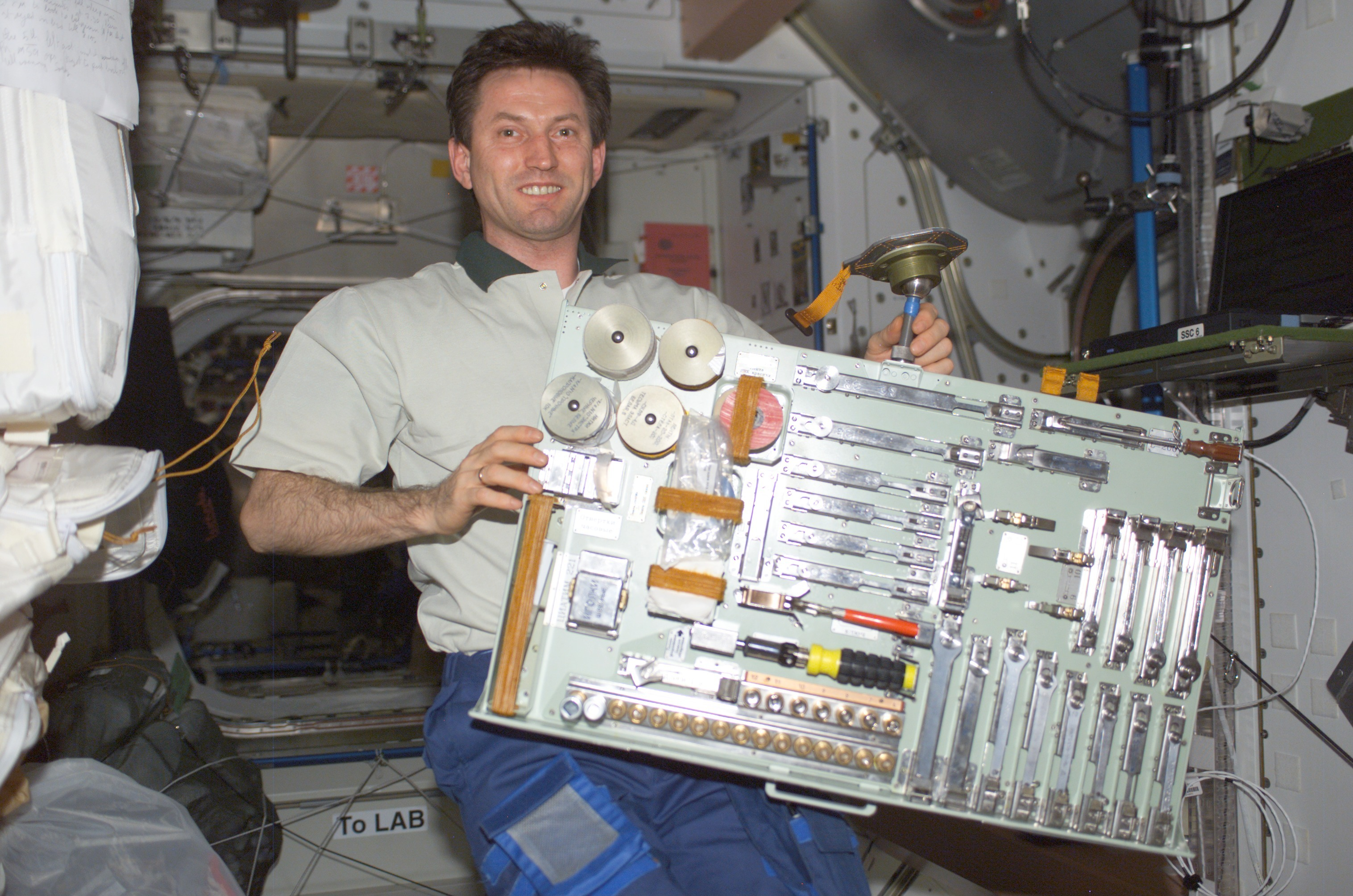
Sergei Treshchov holds a pallet containing various tools in the Unity node on the ISS.

=== Spacewalks ===
Treschov performed his first and only career spacewalk on August 26, 2002. The start of the spacewalk was delayed because of an air leak in the sealed hatches between the Pirs airlock and the Zvezda module. The problem was easily corrected but took Treshchov and fellow cosmonaut Valery Korzun almost a half-hour to step through the procedures and get ready to go outside. Despite the late start at 05:27 UTC, the two spacewalkers finished everything assigned to them on this spacewalk. Wearing Russian Orlan spacesuits Treschov and Korzun installed a frame on the outside of the Zarya module to house components for future spacewalk assembly tasks. They installed new material samples on a pair of Japanese Space Agency materials exposure experiments housed on the outside of Zvezda. They installed devices on Zvezda that will simplify the routing of tethers during future assembly spacewalks. The two spacewalkers also improved future station amateur radio operations by adding two ham radio antennas on Zvezda. The spacewalk was staged from the Pirs docking compartment airlock and lasted 5 hours and 21 minutes.

== See also ==
- List of Heroes of the Russian Federation
