= Valery Korzun =

Russian cosmonaut (born 1953)

- Валерий Корзун
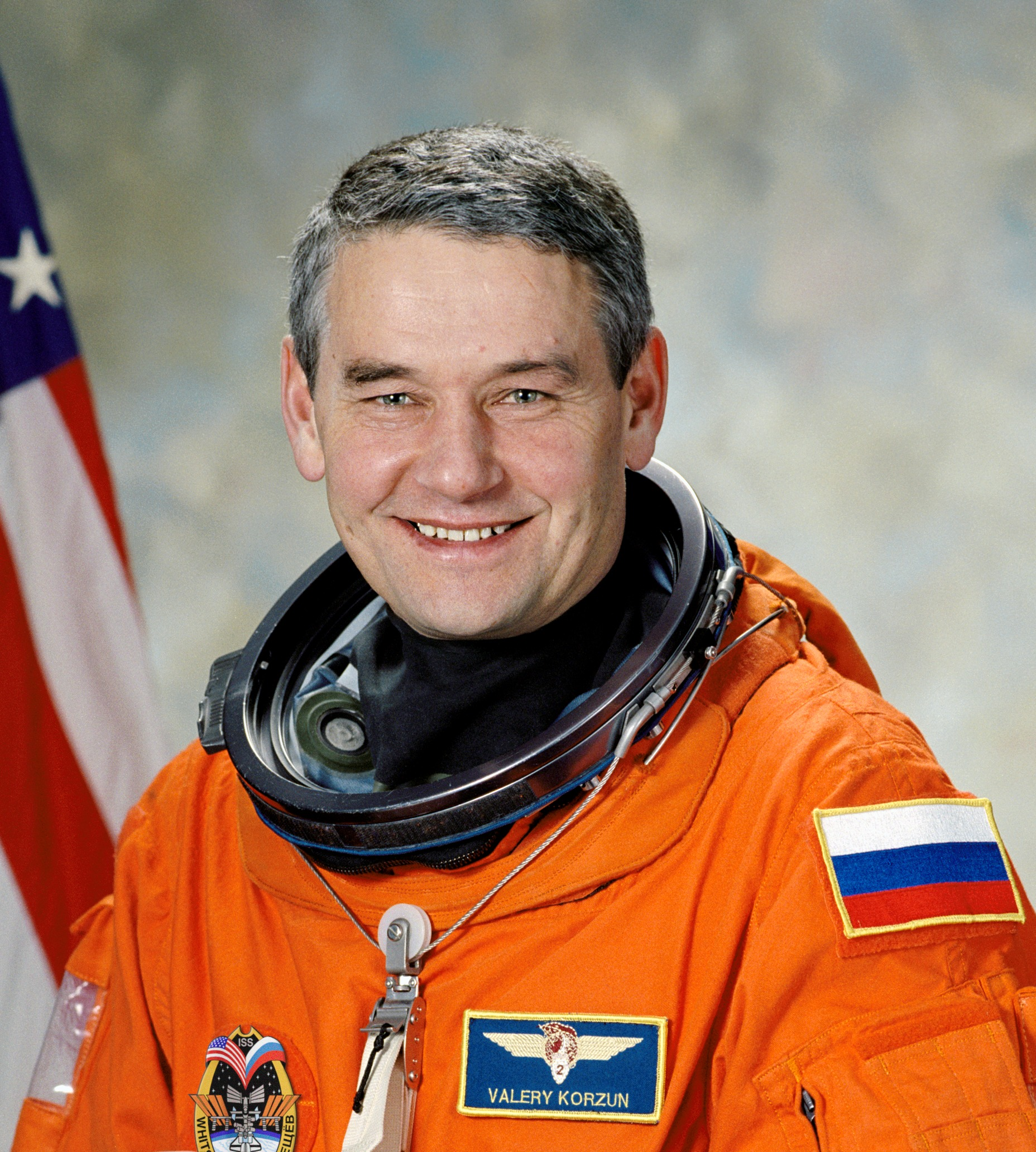
- Born: 5 March 1953 (age 73); Krasny Sulin, Rostov Oblast, Russian SFSR, Soviet Union
- Occupation: Pilot
- Space career

Roscosmos cosmonaut
- Status: Retired
- Rank: Colonel
- Time in space: 381d 15h 41min
- Selection: 1987 TsPK Cosmonaut Group
- Total EVAs: 4
- Total EVA time: 22 hours 19 minutes
- Missions: Soyuz TM-24 (Mir EO-22), Expedition 5 (STS-111/STS-113)

Valery Grigoryevich Korzun (Russian: Валерий Григорьевич Корзун, born 5 March 1953) is a former Russian cosmonaut. He has been in space twice totalling 381 days. He has also conducted four career spacewalks.

== Personal ==
He is a Russian Air Force Colonel and cosmonaut of Yuri Gagarin Cosmonaut Training Center, and was born on 5 March 1953 in Krasny Sulin. Korzun and his wife Elana have one son, Nikita. His father is Korzun Grigori Andreyevich, and his mother is Korzun Maria Arsentievna. His hobbies include tennis, badminton and theater.

== Education ==
In 1974, Korzun graduated from the Kachinsk higher military aviation pilot school. In 1987 he graduated from the Gagarin Military Aviation Academy.

== Awards ==
Korzun was awarded:

- the title of Hero of Russian Federation;
- the title of Pilot-Cosmonaut of the Russian Federation;
- Cavalier of Legion of Honour (France).

He has also been awarded with Russian and NASA medals.

== Experience ==
After graduation from the Kachinsk Military College in 1974, Korzun served as a pilot, a senior pilot, a flight section leader, and ultimately as a commander of a Soviet Air Force squadron.

Korzun is a 1st class military pilot and has logged 1473 hours, primarily in 4 aircraft types. He is also an Instructor of Parachute Training, and has completed 377 parachute jumps.

== Cosmonaut career ==
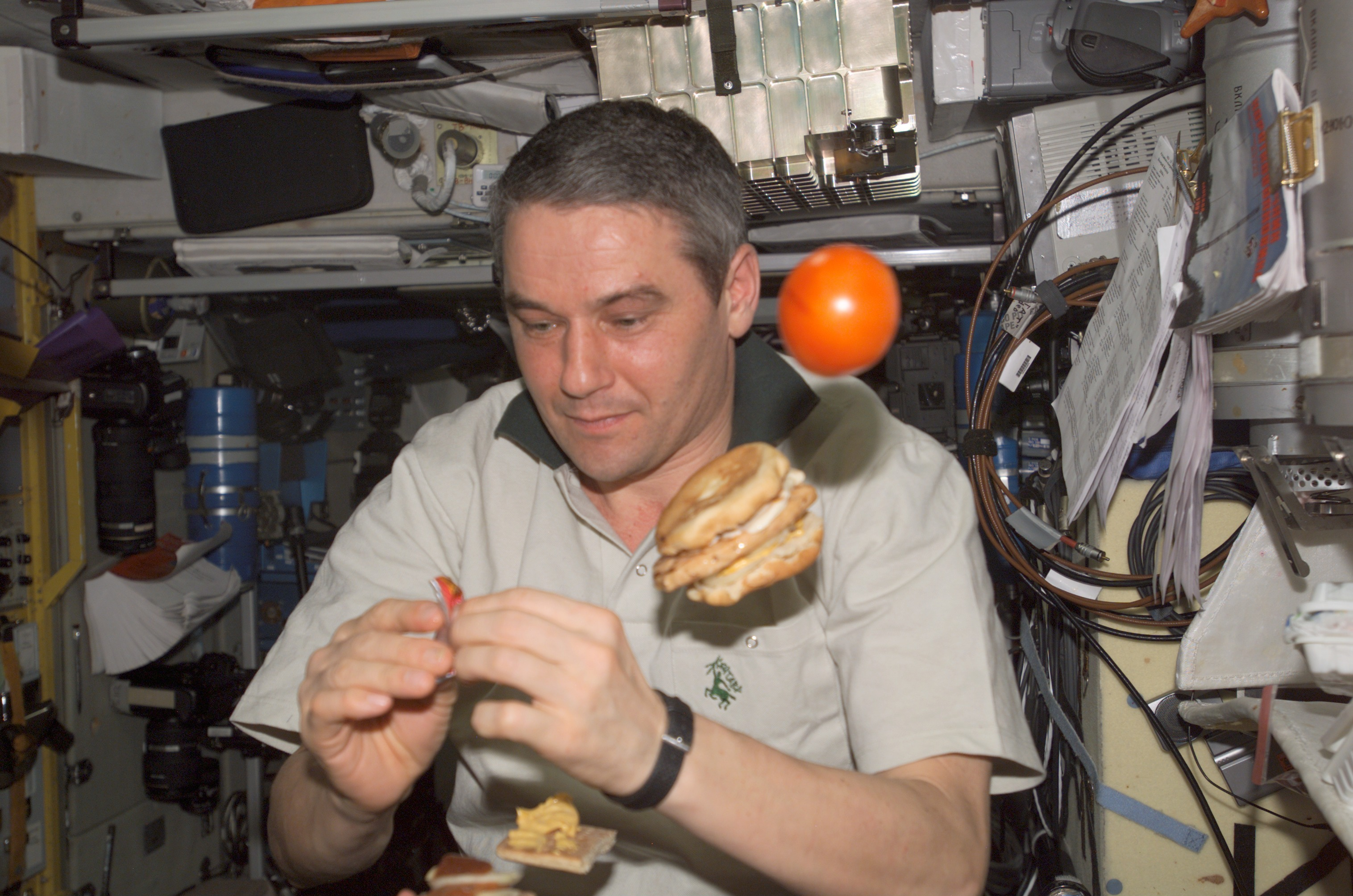
Valery Korzun prepares to eat a meal in the Zvezda Module on the ISS.

In 1987, after a successful tour as commander of the Gagarin Military Air-Force Academy, he was selected as a cosmonaut for training at the Gagarin Cosmonaut Training Center. In December 1987 he began cosmonaut training and was certified as a Test-Cosmonaut in June 1989. From September 1989 through September 1992, he trained for space flight as part of the test-cosmonauts group and from October 1992 to March 1994 he underwent extensive training as commander of the Soyuz-TM rescue spacecraft. He also trained as a group member for flight on board the orbital complex Mir from March 1994 to June 1995. Korzun also served as deputy Director of the 27KC crew flight training complex as crew communication supervisor from March 1994 to January 1995.

In August 1996 Korzun completed training as commander for the Mir-22/ NASA-3 and "Cassiopia" (sponsored by CNES) programs.

=== Mir EO-22 ===
Korzun made his first trip to space on board the Soyuz TM-24 with cosmonaut Alexander Kaleri, and the first French woman in space, Claudie André-Deshays on 17 August 1996. The Soyuz spacecraft lifted off from the Baikonur Cosmodrome at 13:18:03 UTC. After two days of solo flight, the Soyuz docked with the Mir station on 19 August at 14:50:23 UTC. Korzun and Kaleri became the 22nd resident crew, first together with NASA astronaut Shannon Lucid, later with astronauts John Blaha and Jerry Linenger. On 2 March 1997 Soyuz TM-24 carrying Korzun, Kaleri and ESA astronaut Reinhold Ewald returned to Earth. The Soyuz capsule landed landing 128 km east of Jezkazgan at 06:44 UTC. Korzun spent 196 days, 17 hours and 26 minutes on board Soyuz TM-24 and Mir.

=== Expedition 5 ===
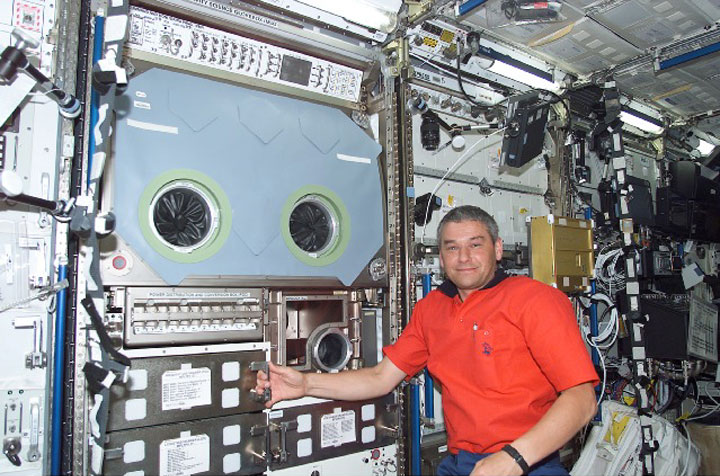
Valeri Korzun with the Microgravity Science Glovebox following its installation in the Destiny Laboratory module of the ISS.

The Expedition 5 crew was launched on 5 June 2002 aboard STS-111. Space Shuttle Endeavour lifted off from the Kennedy Space Center LC-39A at 21:22:49 UTC. After two days Endeavour docked with the International Space Station (ISS) on 7 June 2002 at 16:25 UTC. Korzun joined the Expedition 5 crew as the commander. Expedition 5 crew carried out approximately 25 new investigations on board the ISS, as well as continued with various science investigations begun before their stay. The scientific investigations aimed at studying cold plasma, crystal growth, radiation effects in the space and the human body. Some medical experiments involved blood, muscles, bones while the crew also conducted psychological experiments. Korzun also participated in ecological experiments and monitored the Earth's surface from space. Earth observation from outer space has many useful applications including informing the ground of disaster situations such as fires and floods as quickly as they occur.

The Expedition 5 crew returned to Earth on December 7, 2002, aboard Space Shuttle Endeavour's STS-113 mission. The shuttle touched down at KSC Runway 33 at 19:38:25 UTC. Completing his second long duration spaceflight, Korzun logged 184 days and 22 hours in space.

=== Spacewalks ===
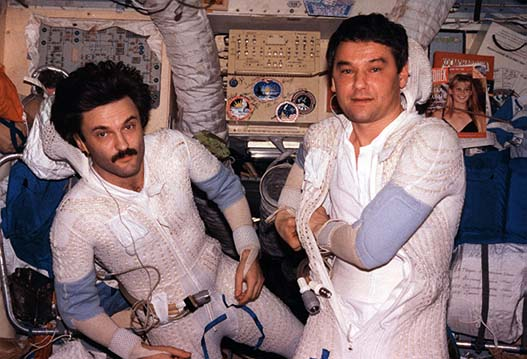
Korzun and Aleksandr Kaleri preparing for spacewalk from Mir.

Korzun has performed four career spacewalks. During the Mir EO-22 mission he performed 2 spacewalks totaling 12 hours and 33 minutes. During ISS Expedition 5, he again performed two spacewalks totalling 9 hours and 46 minutes.

On 2 December 1996 Korzun performed his first career spacewalk with cosmonaut Aleksandr Kaleri. The main purpose was to complete connections of the cooperative solar array to provide more electrical power to the Mir station. The spacewalk started at 15:54 UTC and ended at 21:52 UTC lasting 5 hours and 57 minutes. During the spacewalk, the two cosmonauts installed MCSA cables.

Korzun performed his second career spacewalk on 9 December 1996. The main purpose was to complete connections of the cooperative solar array to provide more electrical power to the Mir station. He and Kaleri completed the MCSA cable installation and attached a Kurs docking antenna. The spacewalk started at 13:50 and ended at 20:28 lasting 6 hours and 38 minutes.

Korzun performed two spacewalks during his six-month stay aboard the ISS. On 16 August 2002 Korzun performed his third career spacewalk together with NASA astronaut Peggy Whitson. The two spacewalkers got off to a late start because they evidently forgot to open an oxygen valve in their Russian Orlan spacesuits while getting prepared and the Pirs docking compartment airlock had to be repressurized. Once the valves were set correctly, Korzun reported a pressure leak but the Russian officials declared it as a no issue. By the time the hatch was finally opened almost two hours had been wasted and the spacewalk was cut short to a duration of 4.5 hours. The objective of the spacewalk was to fortify the ISS against damaging space debris. Korzun and Whitson installed six debris panels onto the Zvezda Service Module. They removed the panels from their temporary location on the station's PMA-1 prior to attachment to Zvezda. The panels are designed to shield Zvezda from potential space debris impacts. The spacewalk lasted 4 hours and 25 minutes.

Korzun performed his fourth career spacewalk on 26 August 2002. The start of the spacewalk was delayed because of an air leak in the sealed hatches between the Pirs airlock and the Zvezda module. The problem was easily corrected but took Korzun and Sergei Treshchov almost a half-hour to step through the procedures and get ready to go outside. Despite the late start at 05:27 UTC, the two spacewalkers finished everything assigned to them on this spacewalk. Wearing Russian Orlan spacesuits Korzun and Treshchov installed a frame on the outside of the Zarya module to house components for future spacewalk assembly tasks. They installed new material samples on a pair of Japanese Space Agency materials exposure experiments housed on the outside of Zvezda. They installed devices on Zvezda that will simplify the routing of tethers during future assembly spacewalks. The two spacewalkers also improved future station amateur radio operations by adding two ham radio antennas on Zvezda. The spacewalk was staged from the Pirs docking compartment airlock and lasted 5 hours and 21 minutes.
