= Holy Family Diocesan High School =

Coordinates: 40°48′45″N 73°23′21″W

Holy Family Diocesan High School was a college preparatory school located at 275 Wolf Hill Road in South Huntington, New York. It was a Catholic School operated by the Diocese of Rockville Centre. The first year of operation was 1966–67 school year. In that year only the freshman class was enrolled. As each year passed another freshman class was added while the prior freshman class were promoted to the senior grade of the school. The 1969–1970 school year was the first year in which the school had all four high school years in attendance. The class of 1970 was the first graduating class in the school's history.

The founding Principal at HF was Father John Rowan, and was later followed by Father James P. Kelly. The teachers were lay teachers, sisters from Ursuline order of nuns, and sisters from The Sisters of Joseph, whose mother home was located in Brentwood, Long Island. The top floor of the four floor building was a convent where the Ursulines lived on one side and the Sisters of St Joseph lived on the other.

The school had a unique design. It was always planned as a co-ed school. But originally the plan called for girls classes to be given on the north side of the building and boys classes to be on the south side. Boys and girls were to be taught separately from each other. Thus the school had two biology labs next to each other, two chemistry labs, two language labs, etc. The school had an architectural design with double doors that separated the boys' side from the girls' side. The cafeteria had south and north entrances. the Library had south and north entrances. The gym had a north side and a south side slit for boys and girls. The chapel had a south and north entrance.

But the plan for separating boys and girls never was enacted. From the day the school opened in September 1966, boys and girls shared classrooms, labs, the library and pretty much everything else.

The school offered a number of after school activities such as drama, sports, art, chorus and band. The first school newspaper was produced in 1966. The year 1973 was the first year the school won its football championship for their league. The school also put on the musicals and dramas starting in 1966. In 1968, the drama club, under the direction of Sister Marie Torre, performed "Oklahoma." This was followed by a production of inherit the wind in 1969 and another musical "My Fair Lady" in 1970. Charlie Clute took over the drama club in the 1970–71 school year. He went on to direct "West Side Story" in 1973, and was then the Director of the Holy Family Theatre Company and an English teacher at the school. The school also had a Speech and Debate Club under the direction of Sister Mary Alphonsus. Starting in 1966, students competed—and won—in regional and statewide competitions.

The first graduation took place in June 1970. Inclement weather caused it to be held in the gymnasium. The following year, the ceremonies were held on the football field. Other traditions were established as the students moved through the 4-year cycle. The first "Ring Day" was held in the spring of 1969. This was the day the first class rings were awarded to the junior class. The rings were unique—there was no stone, simply a graphic interpretation of the Holy Family in gold. Two notable graduates from the class of 1970 are, Jim Wetherbee, NASA astronaut, and John L. Hennessy, chairman of the Board of Alphabet/Google, and former president of Stanford University.

In 1984, the diocese decided to close the school down and the building was taken over by another Catholic school —St. Anthony's High School—who moved their school operation from their old Smithtown campus to the grounds of Holy Family.
