= Christopher Loria =

American astronaut

Gus Loria
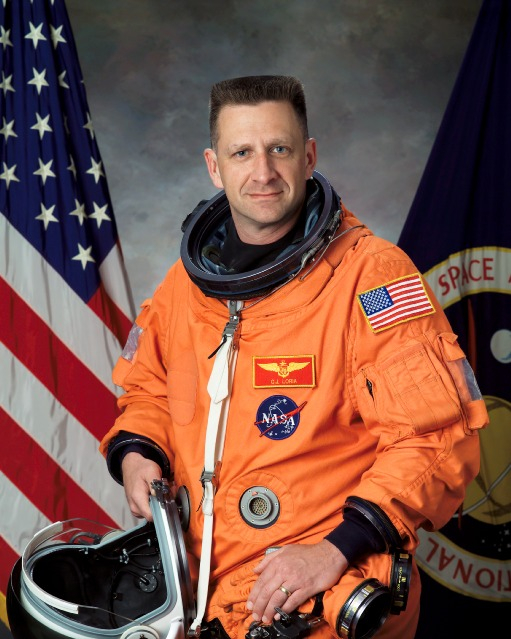
- Born: Christopher Joseph Loria; July 9, 1960 (age 66); Newton, Massachusetts, U.S.
- Other name: C. J.
- Education: United States Naval Academy (BS); Harvard University (MPA); Florida Institute of Technology (MS)
- Space career

NASA astronaut
- Rank: Colonel, USMC
- Selection: NASA Group 16 (1996)

Christopher Joseph "Gus" Loria (born July 9, 1960) is a retired United States Marine Corps Colonel and a medically retired NASA astronaut. He was originally scheduled to fly on STS-113 as pilot; however, he was grounded from spaceflight due to a severe back injury.

== Personal ==
Colonel "CJ" Loria was born in Newton, Massachusetts. His mother, Joan Loria, is deceased and his father, Robert L. Loria is deceased.

== Education ==
Loria graduated from Belmont High School in 1978 and the U.S. Naval Academy Preparatory School in 1979. He entered the U.S. Naval Academy shortly after and graduated with a Bachelor of Science degree in general engineering in 1983, and is a Distinguished Hispanic graduate of the Naval Academy. He later completed 30 credits of coursework toward a Master of Science degree in aeronautical engineering at the Florida Institute of Technology. In 2004 he earned a Master in Public Administration from the John F. Kennedy School of Government at Harvard University where he was twice selected as a Harvard University Fellow. As a Fellow he worked on clean energy technology, and CO_{2} sequestration. In June 2008 he earned an Executive Certificate in Business Management and Leadership from the MIT Sloan School of Management.

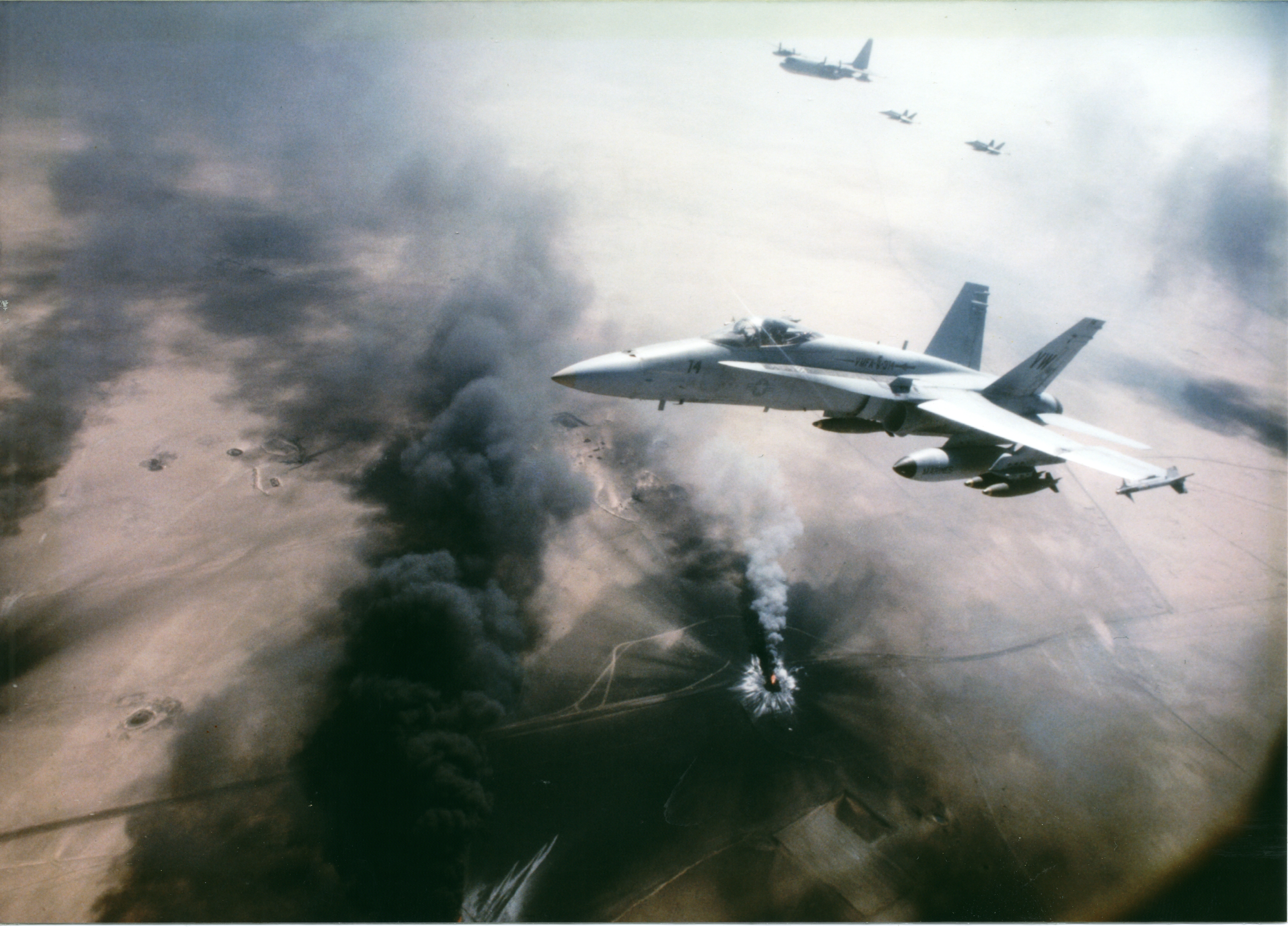

== Military career ==
CJ "Gus" Loria, X-31A Test Pilot

Loria received his commission after graduating from Annapolis in 1983, and was designated a Naval Aviator in July 1988. He transitioned to the F/A-18 Hornet with Strike Fighter Squadron 125 (VFA-125) at Naval air Station Lemoore, California, during August 1988 through August 1989. His next assignment was with Marine Fighter Attack Squadron 314 (VMFA-314) the "Black Knights" at Marine Corps Air Station El Toro, California. While assigned to the Black Knights he deployed to Bahrain for Operations Desert Shield and Desert Storm where he flew 42 combat missions in support of allied operations and earned three citations for valor. In 1992, while assigned as an instructor pilot to Marine Fighter Attack Training Squadron 101 (VMFAT-101) he was selected for the United States Air Force Test Pilot School at Edwards Air Force Base, California.

January 1994 to July 1996, he was assigned to the Strike Aircraft Test Squadron, Naval Air Station Patuxent River, Maryland, as an experimental test pilot. Loria distinguished himself in the areas of high angle of attack flight test, aircraft departure and spin testing, ordnance, flight controls and aircraft flying qualities testing for the F/A-18 Hornet, NASA F/A-18 'HARV' thrust vectoring aircraft and the X-31A aircraft. Colonel Loria was the Naval Test Wing Atlantic's test pilot of the year in 1995. In 1996 he was the runner up for the Society of Experimental Test Pilot's coveted Iven C. Kinchloe Award for the test pilot of the year world-wide.

From August 2004 through February 2005 he was assigned as the Deputy Chief Engineer, Constellation Program at NASA Headquarters. In the fall of 2005 a NASA medical evaluation determined that his previous injuries disqualified him from further space flight assignments. Colonel Loria requested a transfer back to the US Marine Corps and left NASA in February 2005.

After returning to the Marine Corps from NASA, he served as the Inspector General for the 1st Marine Air Wing, Okinawa, Japan and served as the Director of Operations (J3) for Cheyenne Mountain Complex, NORAD before retiring from military service on December 1, 2008.

He has 3,079 hours of flight time and has flown 32 different aircraft.

== NASA career ==
Loria's NASA experience includes assignment as test pilot and Project Officer for the Department of the Navy on the X-31 Program at the NASA Dryden Flight Research Facility, Edwards Air Force Base, California, from July 1994 to June 1995. He was also a test pilot on Dryden's F/A-18 High Alpha Research Vehicle or "HARV" during March 1995, conducting spin testing and the first successful excitation of the Hornet Falling Leaf out of control mode during flight test. Lead Department of the Navy test pilot on the NASA/U.S. Navy/Industry Aircraft Control Power Working Group.

Selected by NASA in April 1996 as an Astronaut Candidate, Loria reported to the Johnson Space Center in August 1996. Having completed two years of training and evaluation, he was qualified for flight assignment as a shuttle pilot. Loria was initially assigned technical duties in the Astronaut Office as an Ascent and Entry CAPCOM. Loria served as an Ascent/Entry Capcom for Space Shuttle missions STS-102 (Mar. 2001), STS-106 (Sept. 2000), STS-97 (Dec. 2000), STS-102 (Mar 2001), STS-104 (June 2001), STS-105 (June 2001). Additionally, he served as an International Space Station (ISS) CAPCOM for Space Station Expedition III in the spring of 2001.

Assigned as pilot on STS-113, Loria was medically grounded after he experienced two herniated discs in his lower back during the summer of 2002. From September 2002 through July 2003 he served as the Chief of Flight Test for the Orbital Space Plane Program. Selected by the NASA Headquarters Executive Development Education panel, was the recipient of the coveted NASA Fellowship to the Kennedy School of Government at Harvard University. While at Harvard, Loria was selected as a Harvard University Non-Resident Fellow, Belfer Center for Science and International Affairs (a policy institute or think tank) for 2003-04 where he worked on clean energy policy. He earned an MPA in June 2004, and was selected as a Fellow at the Center for Business and Government (a policy institute or think tank) at the Kennedy School. Following Harvard, Loria served as the Deputy Chief Engineer for the Constellation Program at NASA Headquarters in Washington, D.C.

During the fall of 2004, Loria's injuries were deemed inoperable and resulted in his being medically disqualified from future space flight exploration missions. Loria requested assignment back to the operational forces of the Marine Corps.

He became a member of the Senior Executive Service and served as the Director of the Earth Resources Observation and Science center (EROS), with the U.S. Geological Survey in Sioux Falls, South Dakota. Colonel Loria is now retired, and resides in Orono, Minnesota.

== Post NASA career ==
He served as a consultant for the National Science Foundation (NSF), the Office of Senator Kay Bailey Hutchinson, Office of Congressman Jim Bridenstine, and International Launch Services, Inc. (ILS). With SAIC and later Leidos, he worked on National strategic programs with the Defense Information Systems Agency at Fort Meade, MD. During 2014 & 2015 he was the second Observatory Director for the NSF's National Ecological Observatory Network (NEON). As a member of the Federal government's Senior Executive Service with the U.S. Geological Survey he was the Center Director for the Earth Resources Observation and Science (EROS) Center in Sioux Falls, SD.

== Awards and honors ==
- NASA Fellow
- Harvard Kennedy School Fellow
- NASA Certificate of Appreciation 2010
- NASA Acquisition Improvement Award
- NASA Group Achievement Award
- Defense Superior Service Medal
- Meritorious Service Medal (three)
- Navy Commendation Medals (two, one with "V")
- Air Medals (two, both with "V")
- Strike Flight Air Medals (four)
- Navy Achievement Medal
- Naval Test Wing Atlantic Test Pilot of the Year 1995–1996
- Who's Who in the World 1995
- Who's Who in the American West 1994
- Commodore's List with Distinction
- US Naval Academy Distinguished Hispanic Graduate
- US Naval Academy Notable Graduate

== Organizations ==
Society of Experimental Test Pilots, U.S. Naval Academy Alumni Association, Marine Corps Aviation Association, National Rifle Association of America.

== See also ==
- List of Hispanic astronauts
- Hispanics in the United States Marine Corps
- Hispanics in the United States Naval Academy
