= Expedition 5 =

Long-duration mission to the International Space Station

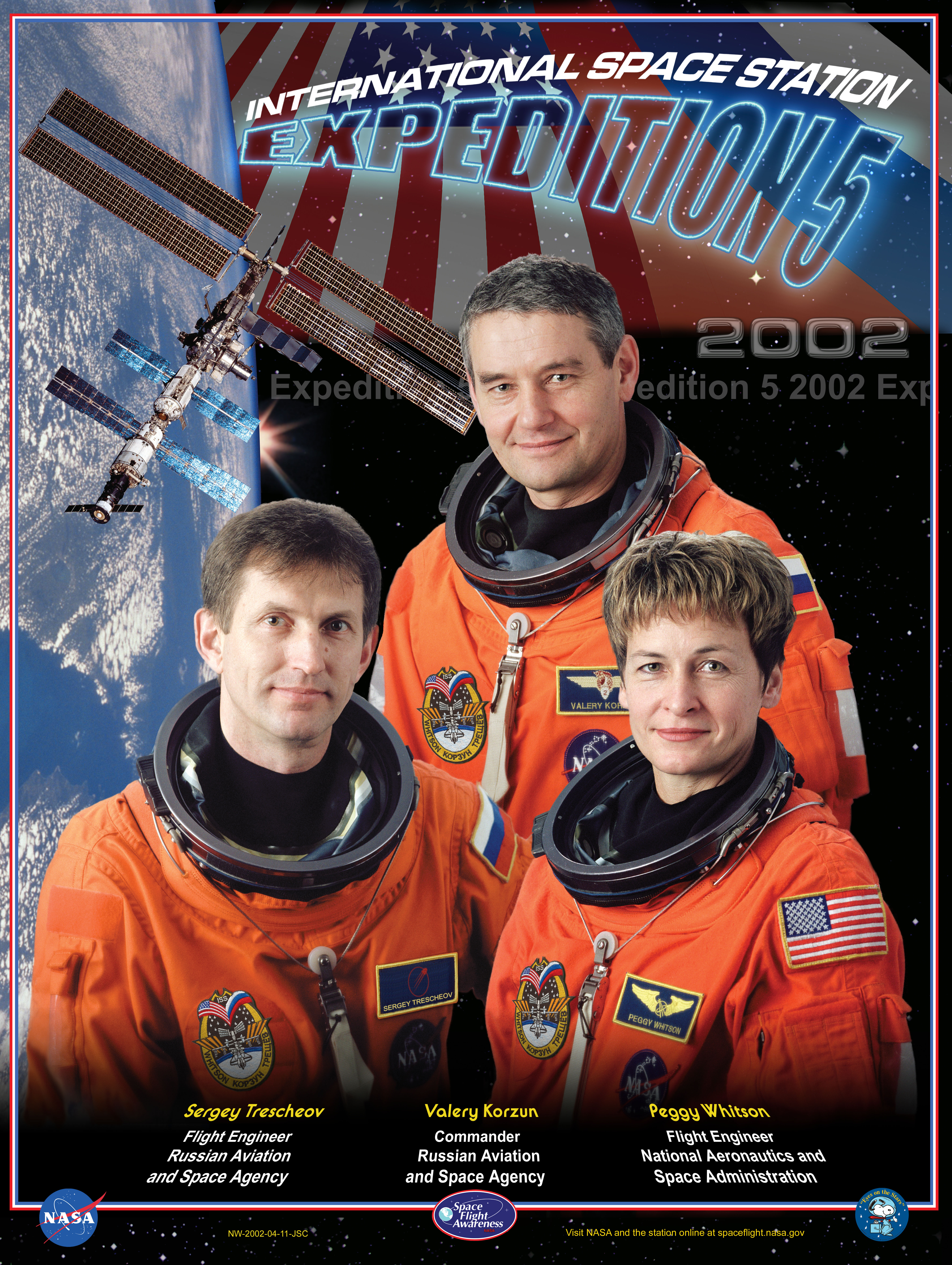
- Promotional poster
- Mission type: Long-duration expedition
- Mission duration: 178 days, 3 hours, 10 minutes (at ISS); 184 days, 22 hours, 14 minutes and 23 seconds (launch to landing)

Expedition
- Space station: International Space Station
- Began: 7 June 2002, 16:25 UTC
- Ended: 2 December 2002, 20:05 UTC
- Arrived aboard: STS-111; Space Shuttle Endeavour
- Departed aboard: STS-113; Space Shuttle Endeavour

Crew
- Crew size: 3
- Members: Valery Korzun; Peggy Whitson; Sergei Treshchev
- EVAs: 2
- EVA duration: 9 hours, 46 minutes
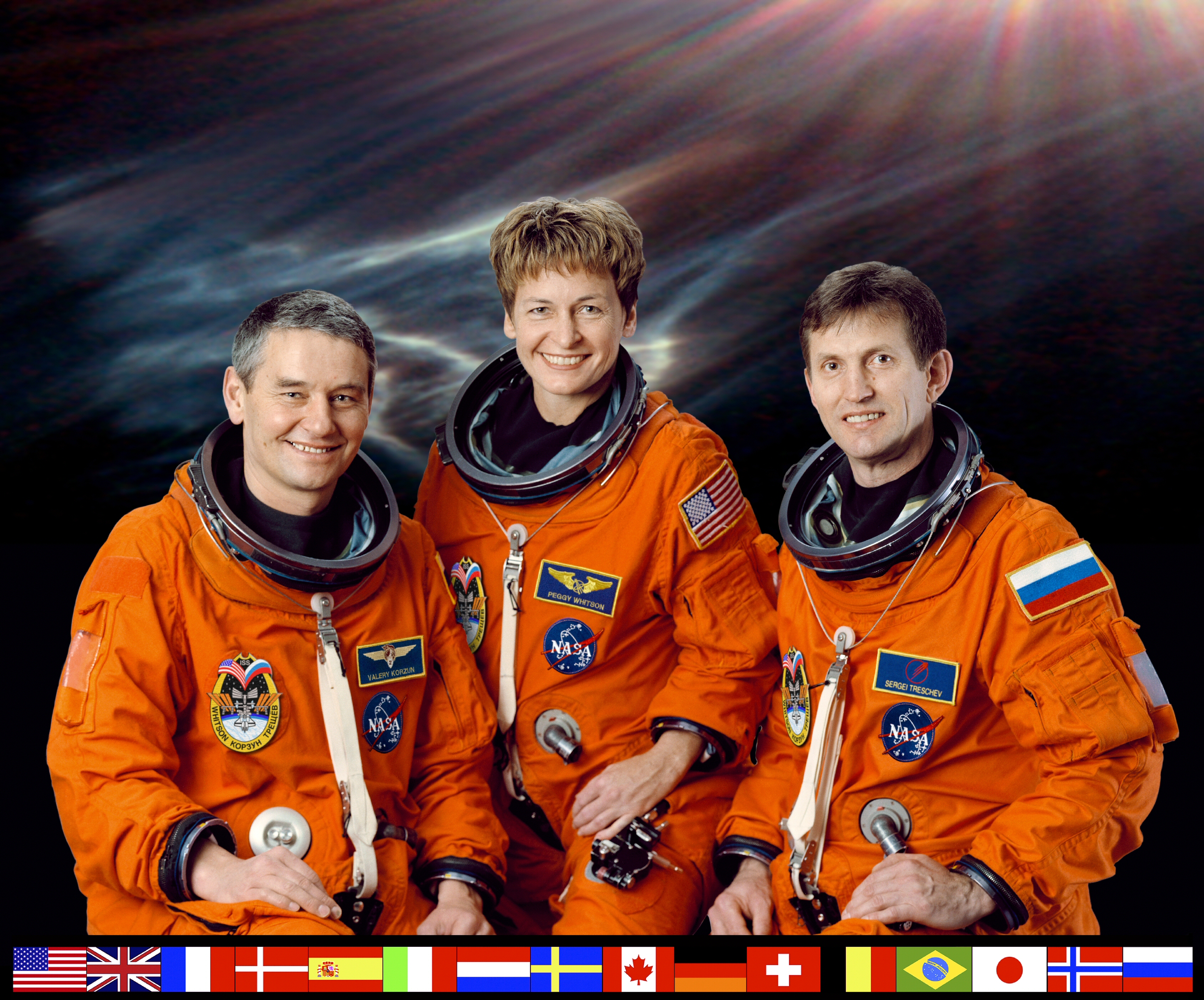
- Expedition 5 mission patch L-R: Valery G. Korzun, Peggy Whitson, and Sergei Y. Treshchev ISS expeditions

Expedition 5 was the fifth long-duration stay on the International Space Station (ISS). The crew, consisting of three people, remained in space for 184 days, 178 of which were spent aboard the ISS. Expedition 5 was a continuation of an uninterrupted human presence in space, as of November 2000, which was begun by Expedition 1 in 2000–2001.

The crew of Expedition 5 launched to space aboard the Space Shuttle Endeavour aboard the STS-111 mission on 5 June 2002. Their tenure aboard the station, however, did not begin until they docked with the ISS two days later on 7 June.

== Crew ==
Prime crew
Position	Crew
Commander	Valery Korzun, RSA; Second and last spaceflight
Flight Engineer	Peggy Whitson, NASA; First spaceflight
Flight Engineer	Sergei Treshchev, RSA; Only spaceflight

Backup crew
Position	Crew
Commander	Aleksandr Kaleri, RSA
Flight Engineer	Scott J. Kelly, NASA
Flight Engineer	Dmitri Kondratyev, RSA

== Mission parameters ==
- Perigee: 384 km
- Apogee: 396 km
- Inclination: 51.6°
- Period: 92 min

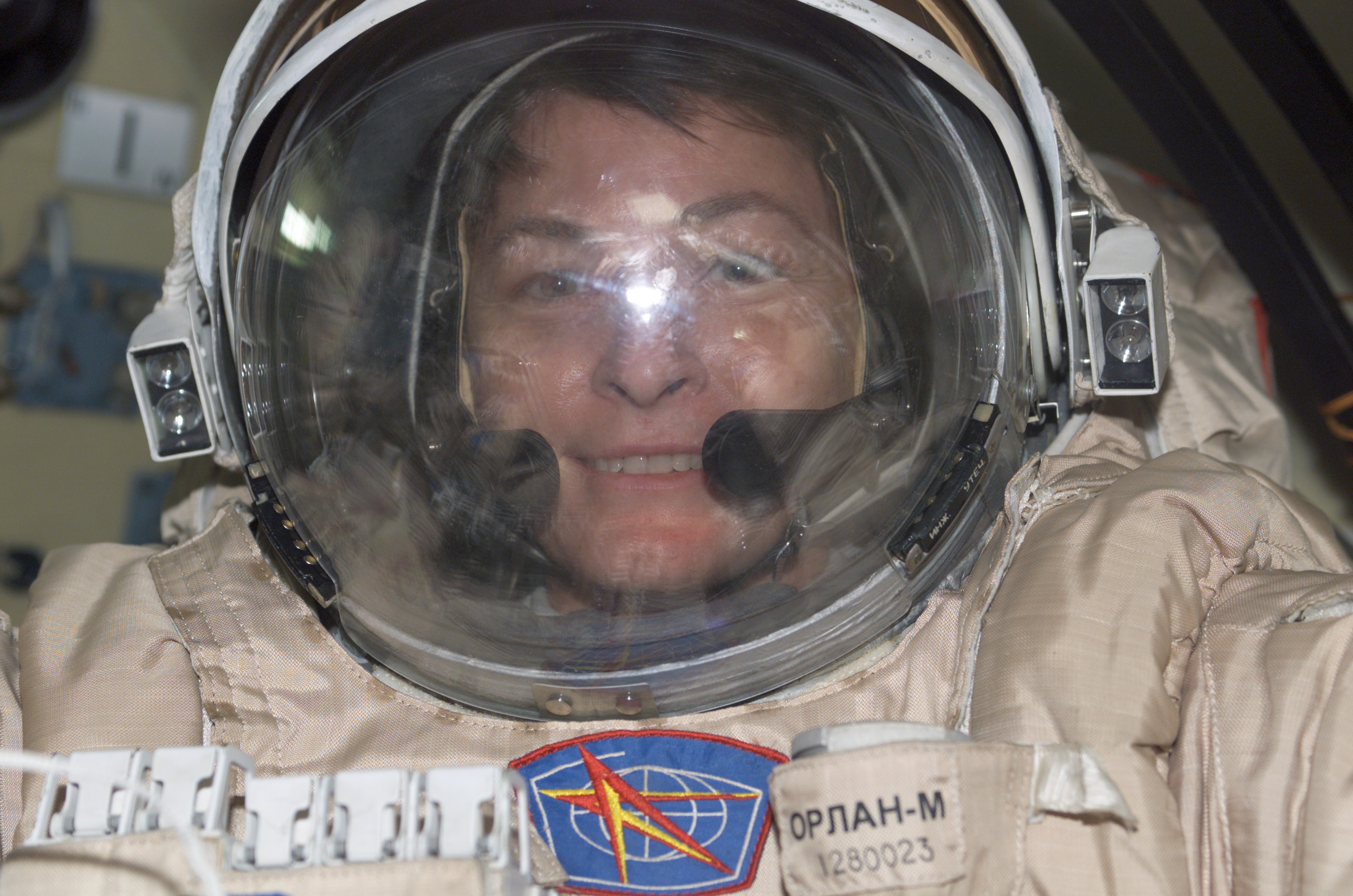
Peggy A. Whitson, Expedition Five flight engineer, wears a Russian Orlan spacesuit as she prepares for an EVA. (NASA)

== Mission objectives ==
The Expedition 5 crew took charge of ISS operations on 7 June 2002. An official ceremony between expedition crews took place 10 June, with the ceremonial ringing of the station's brass bell, symbolizing the transfer of command. The Expedition Five crew carried out approximately 25 new investigations on board the ISS, as well as continued with various science investigations begun before their stay. The crew wrapped up a 184-day stay in space when they returned home on STS-113 7 December 2002.

Space Shuttle Endeavour delivered the Expedition 5 crew during mission STS-111, which launched 5 June 2002. The fifth crew to live aboard the International Space Station was led by Russian Valery Korzun and joined by fellow cosmonaut Sergey Treshchev and U.S. astronaut Peggy A. Whitson, both flight engineers. While on board, Dr. Whitson was named NASA's first ISS science officer by NASA administrator O'Keefe.

== Spacewalks ==
The Expedition Five crewmembers conducted two spacewalks during their stay at the International Space Station. Both were based out of the Pirs Docking Compartment and used Russian Orlan space suits.

Mission	Spacewalkers	Start (UTC)	End (UTC)	Duration
Expedition 5 EVA 1	Valery Korzun; Peggy Whitson	16 August 2002; 09:23	16 August 2002; 13:48	4 hours, 25 minutes
Expedition 5 EVA 1	Korzun and Whitson installed six debris panels onto the Zvezda Service Module. They removed the panels from their temporary location on the station's Pressurized Mating Adapter 1 prior to attachment to Zvezda. The panels are designed to shield Zvezda from potential space debris impacts. A total of 23 shields will eventually be installed onto the Service Module.			
Expedition 5 EVA 2	Korzun; Sergei Treshchev	26 August 2002; 05:27	26 August 2002; 10:48	5 hours, 21 minutes
Expedition 5 EVA 2	During Expedition Five's second spacewalk, Korzun and Treshchev installed a frame on the outside of the Zarya Module to house components for future spacewalk assembly tasks. They installed new material samples on a pair of Japanese Space Agency materials exposure experiments housed on the outside of Zvezda. Korzun and Treshchev also installed devices on Zvezda that will simplify the routing of tethers during future assembly spacewalks. They improved future station amateur radio operations by adding two ham radio antennas on Zvezda. Also, Korzun and Treshchev installed the Kromka hardware that was originally slated to take place during Expedition Five's first spacewalk. Kromka measures residue emissions from Zvezda's jet thrusters.			
