= STS-105 =

2001 American crewed spaceflight to the ISS

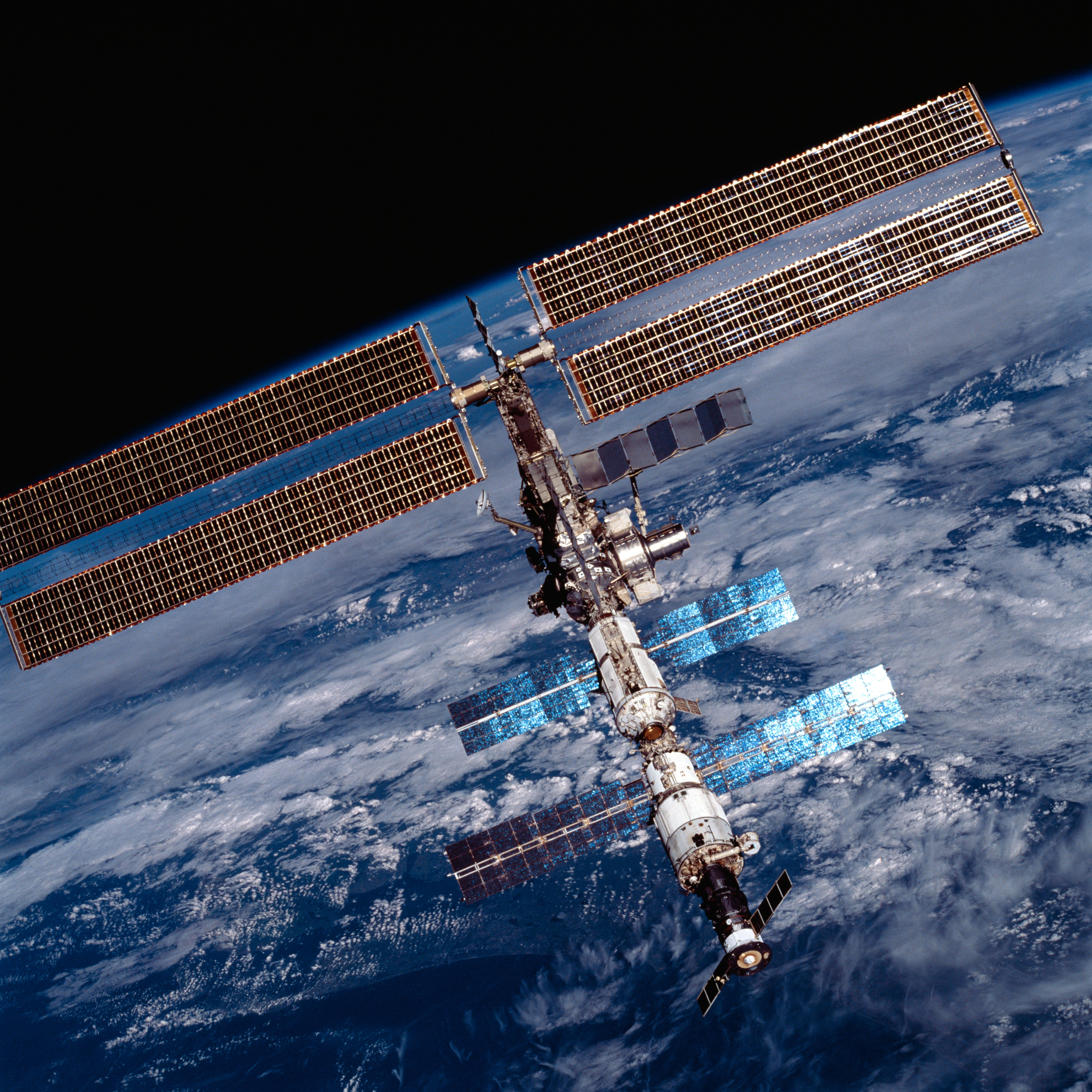
- Aft view of the ISS from the departing Discovery
- Names: Space Transportation System-105
- Mission type: ISS crew rotation/logistics
- Operator: NASA
- COSPAR ID: 2001-035A
- SATCAT no.: 26888
- Mission duration: 11 days, 21 hours, 13 minutes, 52 seconds

Spacecraft properties
- Spacecraft: Space Shuttle Discovery
- Launch mass: 116,914 kilograms (257,751 lb)
- Landing mass: 100,824 kilograms (222,279 lb)
- Payload mass: 9,072 kilograms (20,000 lb)

Crew
- Crew size: 7
- Members: Scott J. Horowitz; Frederick W. Sturckow; Patrick G. Forrester; Daniel T. Barry
- Launching: Frank L. Culbertson Jr.; Mikhail Tyurin; Vladimir N. Dezhurov
- Landing: Yuri V. Usachov; James S. Voss; Susan J. Helms
- EVAs: 2
- EVA duration: 11 hours, 45 minutes

Start of mission
- Launch date: 10 August 2001, 21:10:14 UTC
- Launch site: Kennedy, LC-39A

End of mission
- Landing date: 22 August 2001, 18:23 UTC
- Landing site: Kennedy, SLF Runway 15

Orbital parameters
- Reference system: Geocentric
- Regime: Low Earth
- Perigee altitude: 373 kilometres (232 mi)
- Apogee altitude: 402 kilometres (250 mi)
- Inclination: 51.6 degrees
- Period: 92.3 minutes

Docking with ISS
- Docking port: PMA-2 (Destiny forward)
- Docking date: 12 August 2001 18:41 UTC
- Undocking date: 20 August 2001 14:51 UTC
- Time docked: 7 days, 20 hours, 9 minutes
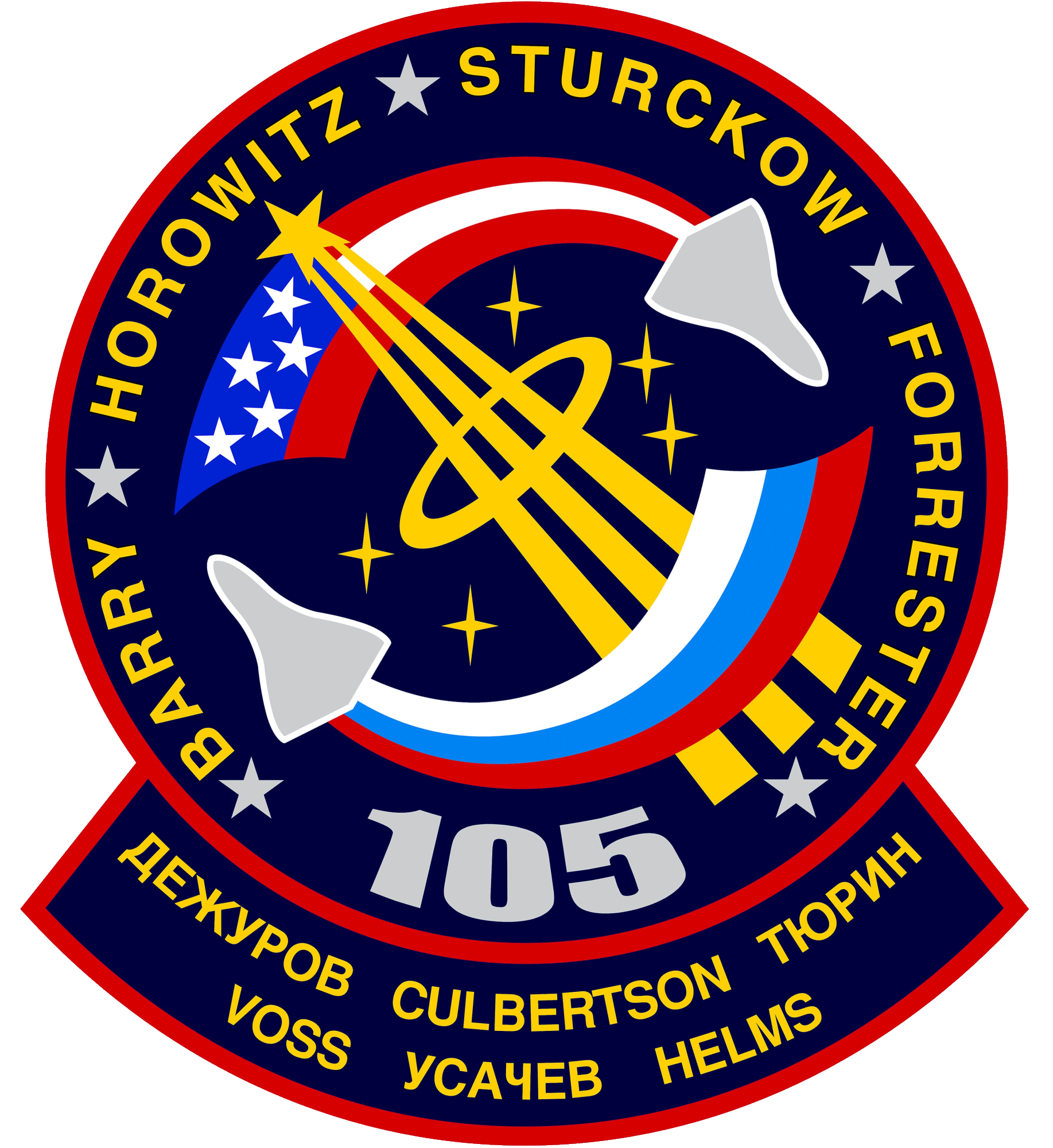
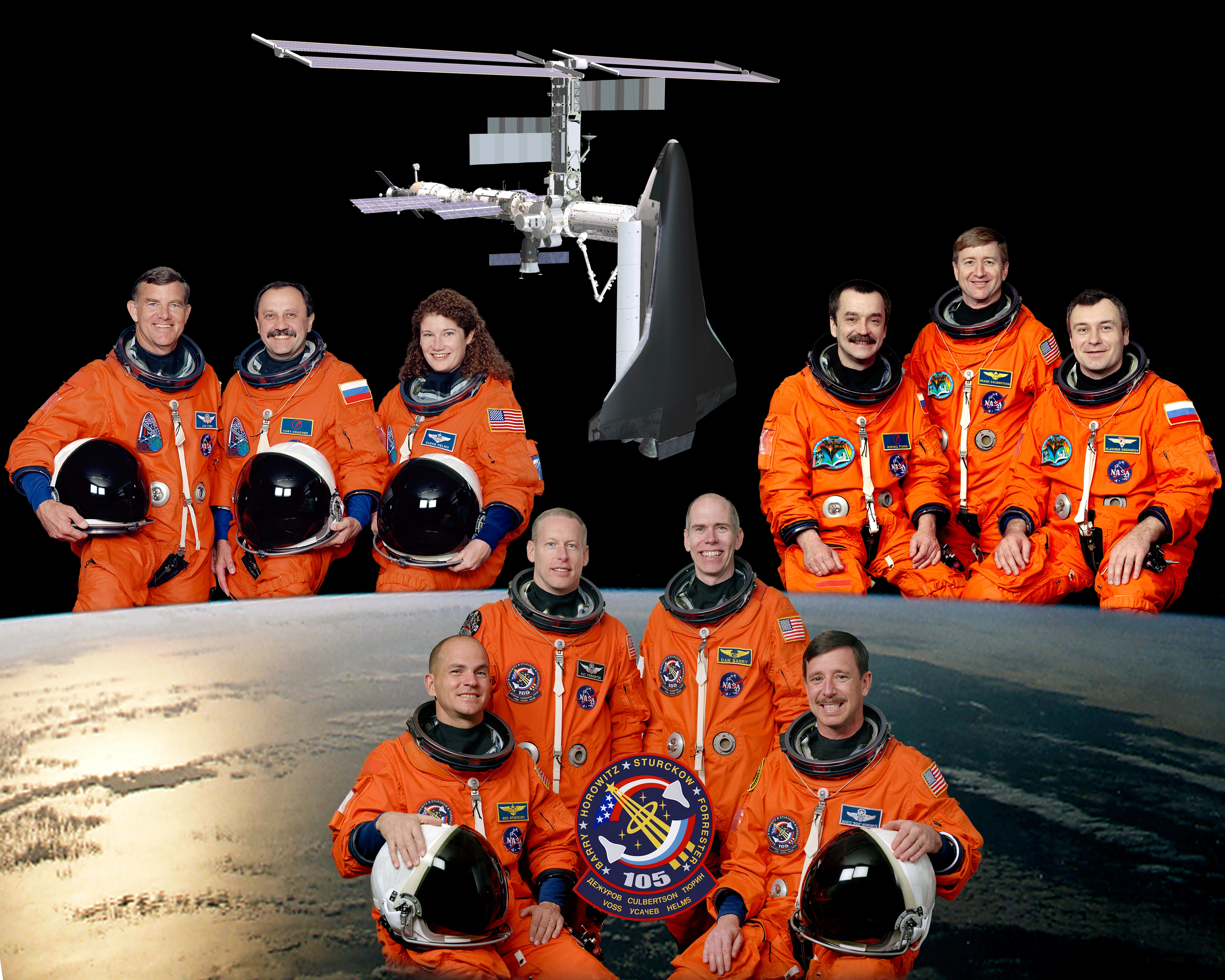
- Left to right. Centre group: Sturckow, Forrester, Barry, Horowitz. Top left (Expedition 2): Voss, Usachov, Helms. Top right (Expedition 3): Tyurin, Culbertson, Dezhurov Space Shuttle program

STS-105 was the 30th mission of Space Shuttle Discovery, in which Discovery went to the International Space Station. It launched from Kennedy Space Center, Florida, on 10 August 2001. This mission was Discovery's final mission until STS-114, because Discovery was grounded for a refit, and then all Shuttles were grounded in the wake of the Columbia disaster. The refit included an update of the flight deck to the glass cockpit layout, which was already installed on Atlantis and Columbia.

== Crew ==
Position	Launching Astronaut	Landing Astronaut
Commander	(United States) Scott J. Horowitz; Fourth and last spaceflight	
Pilot	(United States) Frederick W. Sturckow; Second spaceflight	
Mission Specialist 1	(United States) Patrick G. Forrester; First spaceflight	
Mission Specialist 2 Flight Engineer	(United States) Daniel T. Barry; Third and last spaceflight	
Mission Specialist 3	(United States) Frank L. Culbertson Jr. Expedition 3 Third and last spaceflight ISS Commander	(Russia) Yuri V. Usachov, RKA; Expedition 2 Fourth and last spaceflight ISS Commander/ISS Soyuz Commander
Mission Specialist 4	(Russia) Mikhail Tyurin, RKA; Expedition 3 First spaceflight ISS Flight Engineer	(United States) James S. Voss; Expedition 2 Fifth and last spaceflight ISS Flight Engineer
Mission Specialist 5	(Russia) Vladimir N. Dezhurov, RKA; Expedition 3 Second and last spaceflight ISS Soyuz Commander	(United States) Susan J. Helms; Expedition 2 Fifth and last spaceflight ISS Flight Engineer 2

=== Space walks ===
- Barry and Forrester – EVA 1
- EVA 1 Start: 16 August 2001 – 13:58 UTC
- EVA 1 End: 16 August 2001 – 20:14 UTC
- Duration: 6 hours, 16 minutes
- Barry and Forrester – EVA 2
- EVA 2 Start: 18 August 2001 – 13:42 UTC
- EVA 2 End: 18 August 2001 – 19:11 UTC
- Duration: 5 hours, 29 minutes

=== Crew seat assignments ===
Seat	Launch	Landing	Seats 1–4 are on the flight deck. Seats 5–7 are on the mid-deck.
1	Horowitz		Seats 1–4 are on the flight deck. Seats 5–7 are on the mid-deck.
2	Sturckow		Seats 1–4 are on the flight deck. Seats 5–7 are on the mid-deck.
3	Forrester		Seats 1–4 are on the flight deck. Seats 5–7 are on the mid-deck.
4	Barry		Seats 1–4 are on the flight deck. Seats 5–7 are on the mid-deck.
5	Culbertson	Voss	Seats 1–4 are on the flight deck. Seats 5–7 are on the mid-deck.
6	Dezhurov	Helms	Seats 1–4 are on the flight deck. Seats 5–7 are on the mid-deck.
7	Tyurin	Usachov	Seats 1–4 are on the flight deck. Seats 5–7 are on the mid-deck.

== Mission highlights ==
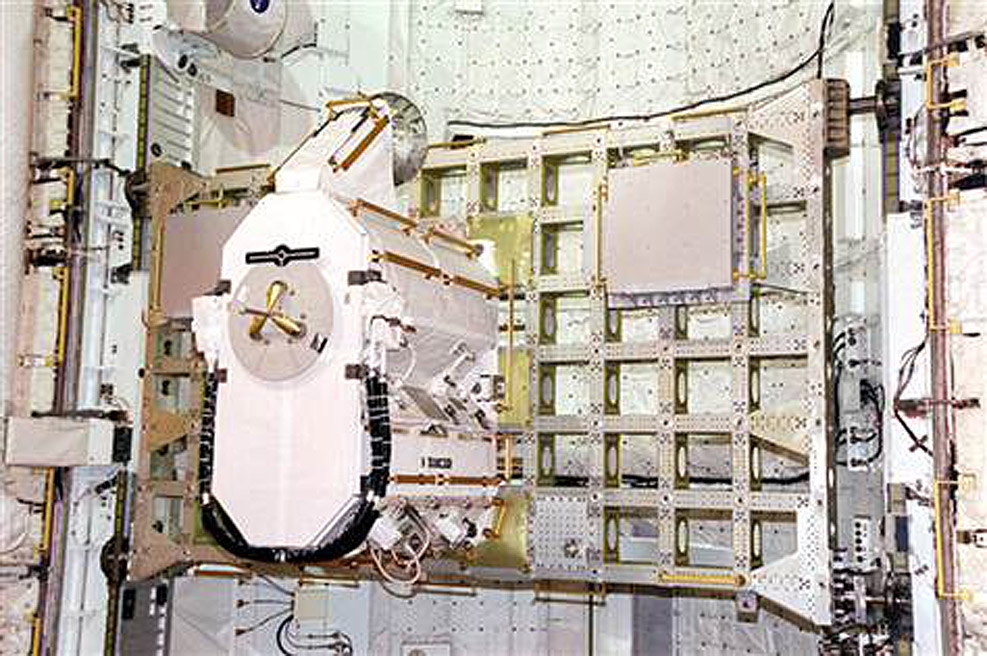
ICC STS-105 with EAS and MISSE

The main purpose of STS-105 was the rotation of the International Space Station crew and the delivery of supplies utilizing the Italian-built Multi Purpose Logistics Module (MPLM) Leonardo on its second flight (STS-102, STS-105). The crew also performed two spacewalks and conducted scientific experiments. The Multi Purpose Logistics Module (MPLM) taken on STS-105 contained additional scientific racks, equipment and supplies. It is 6.4 meters (21 feet) long and 4.6 meters (15 feet) in diameter and has a dry mass of over 4,082 kilograms (8,999 lb). An identical module named Raffaello has flown twice (STS-100 and, later, STS-108).

Aboard Leonardo were six Resupply Stowage Racks, four Resupply Stowage Platforms, and two new scientific experiment racks for the station's U.S. laboratory Destiny. The two new science racks (EXPRESS Racks 4 and 5) added further science capability to the station. EXPRESS stands for Expedite the Processing of Experiments to the Space Station. EXPRESS Rack 4 weighs 533 kilograms (1,175 lb) and EXPRESS Rack 5 weighs 544 kilograms (1,199 lb). The empty weight of each EXPRESS rack is about 356 kilograms (785 lb). EXPRESS Racks 1 and 2A were delivered aboard the Raffaello cargo module during STS-100/6A in April 2001. EXPRESS Rack 3 was brought to the station during STS-111 in 2002. The racks were manufactured at the Space Station Processing Facility.

The Resupply Stowage Racks and Resupply Stowage Platforms were filled with Cargo Transfer Bags that contain equipment and supplies for the station. The six Resupply Stowage Racks contained almost 1,451 kilograms (3,199 lb) of cargo and the four Resupply Stowage Platforms contained about 544 kilograms (1,199 lb) of cargo, not including the weight of the Cargo Transfer Bags, the foam packing around the cargo or the straps and fences that held the bags in place. The total weight of cargo, racks and packing material aboard Leonardo was just over 4,990 kilograms (11,000 lb). Total cargo weight was about 3,073 kilograms (6,775 lb).

Also carried in the payload bay was an Integrated Cargo Carrier (ICC) carrying the Early Ammonia Servicer and MISSE PECs 1 & 2.

Another payload on board is the Materials International Space Station Experiments (MISSE). This project was a NASA/Langley Research Center-managed cooperative endeavor to fly materials and other types of space exposure experiments on the space station. The objective was to develop early, low-cost, non-intrusive opportunities to conduct critical space exposure tests of space materials and components planned for use on future spacecraft. Johnson Space Center, Marshall Space Flight Center, Glenn Research Center, the Materials Laboratory at the Air Force Research Laboratory and Boeing Phantom Works were participants with Langley in the project. The MISSE experiments were the first externally mounted experiments conducted on the ISS. The experiments were in four Passive Experiment Containers (PECs) that were initially developed and used for an experiment on Mir in 1996 during the Shuttle-Mir Program. The PECs were transported to Mir on STS-76. After an 18-month exposure in space, they were retrieved on STS-86. PECs are suitcase-like containers for transporting experiments via the space shuttle to and from an orbiting spacecraft. Once on orbit and clamped to the host spacecraft, the PECs are opened and serve as racks to expose experiments to the space environment.

Other payloads on board were part of the Goddard Space Flight Center's Wallops Flight Facility Shuttle Small Payloads Project. The SSPP system utilizes payload carrier systems such as the Hitchhiker, Getaway Specials and Space Experiment Modules to provide a low cost scientific research environment. SSPP payloads on STS-105 include the Hitchhiker payload Simplesat, The Cell Growth in Microgravity GAS Canister (G-708), the Microgravity Smoldering Combustion experiment (MSC), and the Hitchhiker Experiment Advancing Technology Space Experiment Module-10 payload).

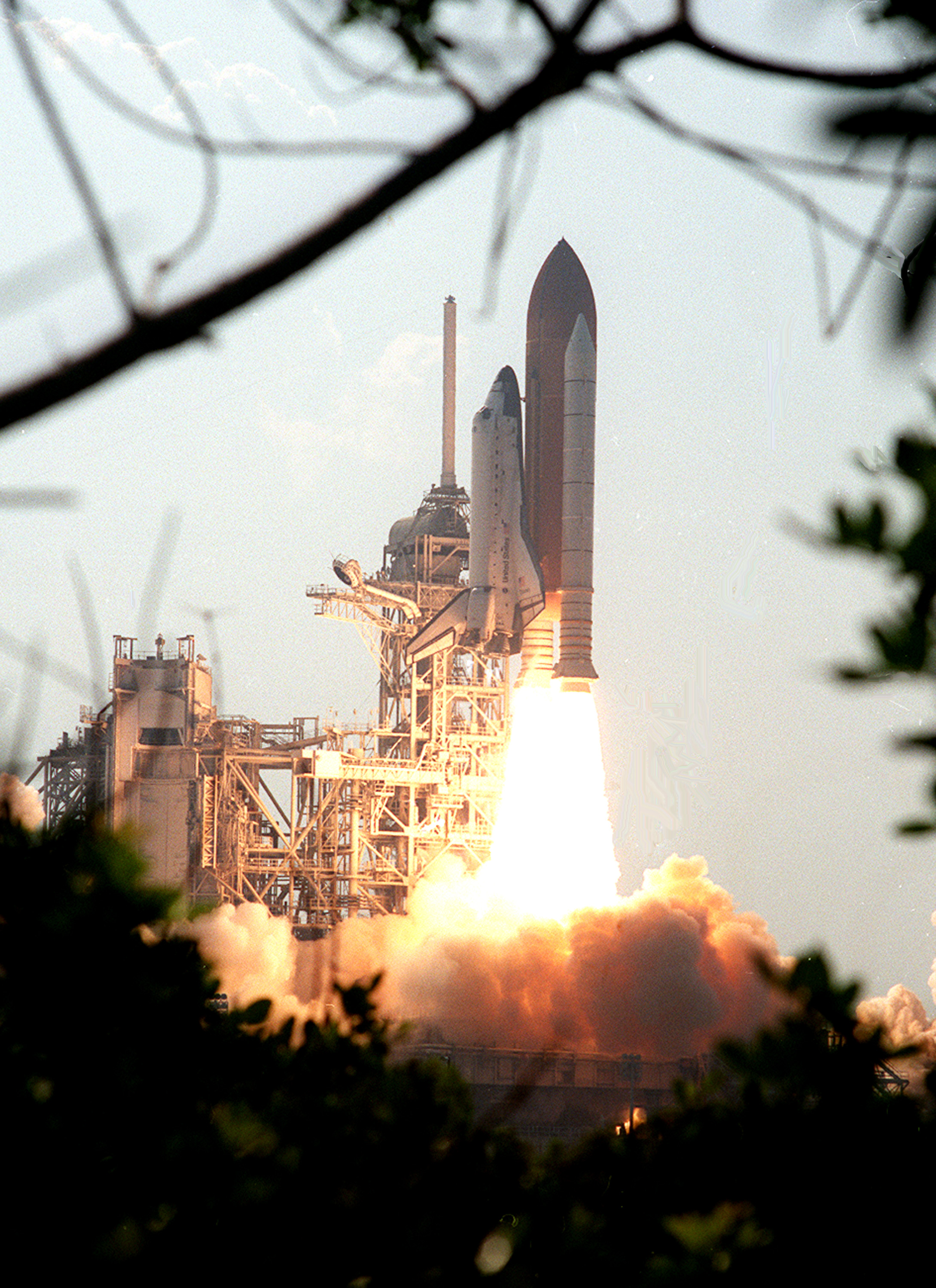
STS-105 launches from Kennedy Space Center, 10 August 2001.

Illustration of the International Space Station during STS-105.

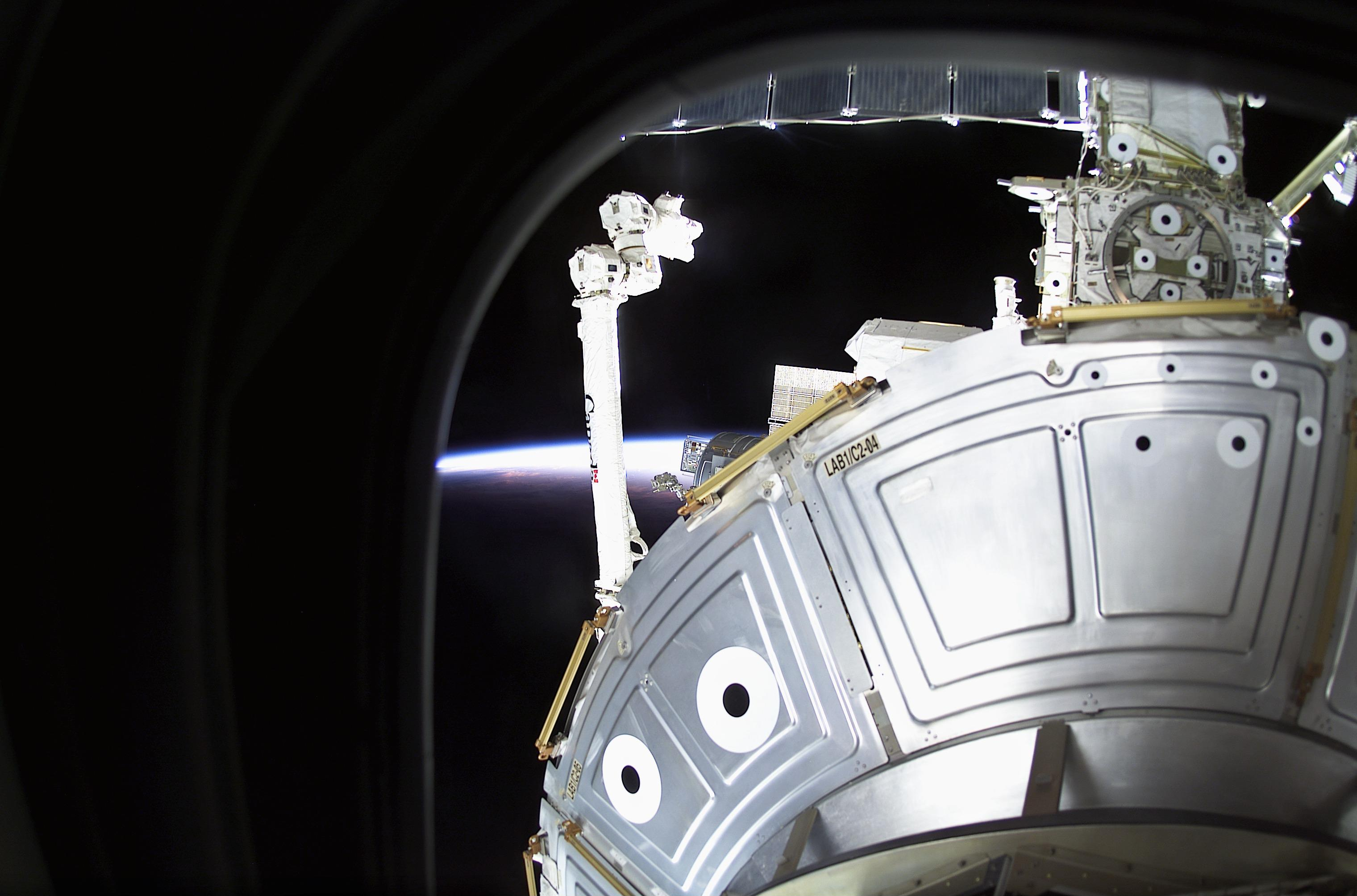
The Canadarm2 / Space Station Remote Manipulator System (SSRMS) being operated by a crew-member.

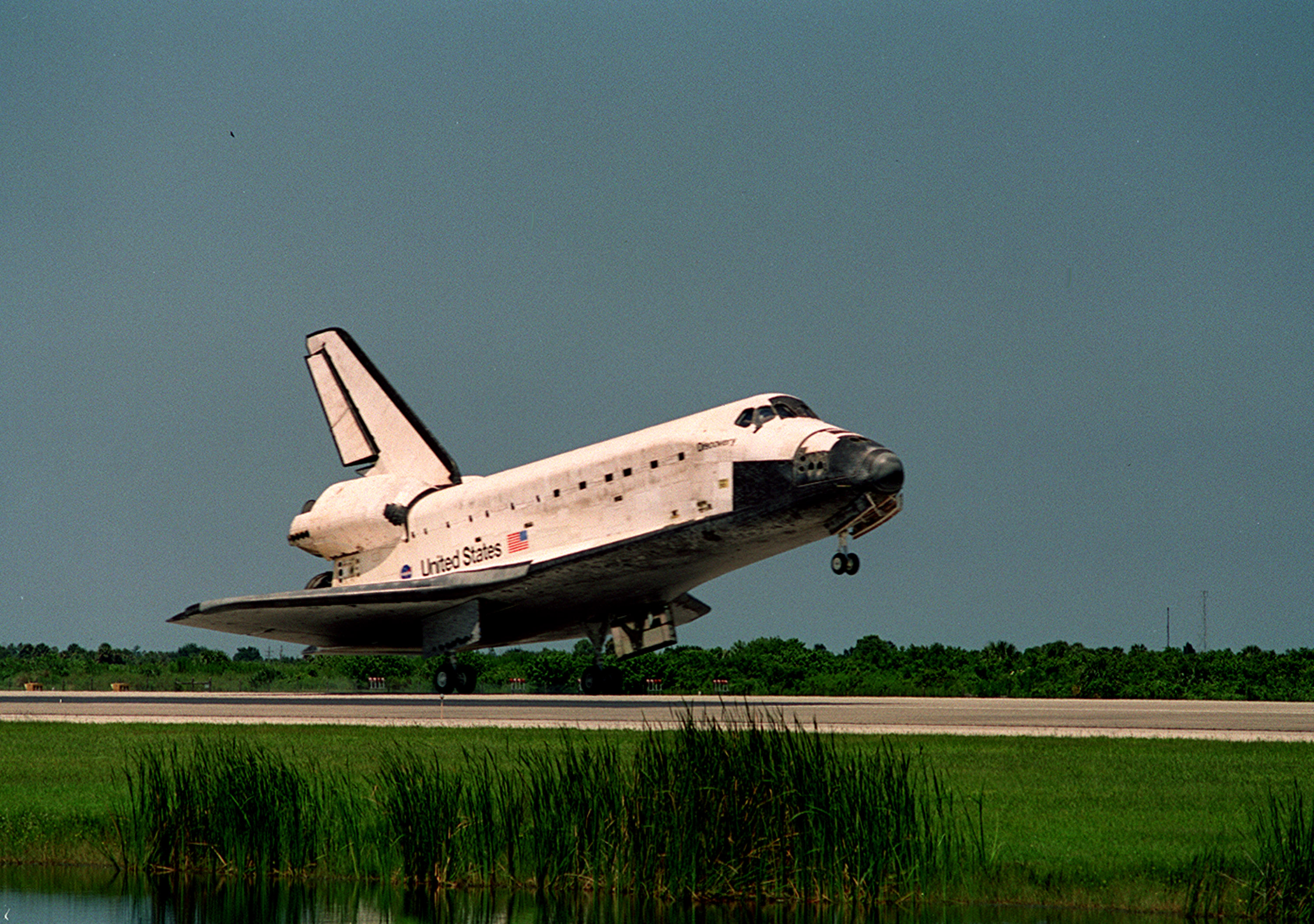
STS-105 lands at the Shuttle Landing Facility, 22 August 2001.

Attempt	Planned	Result	Turnaround	Reason	Decision point	Weather go (%)	Notes
1	9 Aug 2001, 5:37:46 pm	Scrubbed	—	Weather	9 Aug 2001, 5:15 pm (T−00:09:00 hold)	60	Thunderstorms and cloud cover present at KSC.
2	10 Aug 2001, 5:10:14 pm	Success	0 days 23 hours 32 minutes			30	Launched at the opening of the window due to approaching storms.

This was the only Shuttle launch to go before the scheduled launch time, at the beginning, rather than the optimal middle or later, of the 10-minute launch window to rendezvous with ISS. It launched early because an approaching storm system threatened to violate launch criteria at the appointed time.

== Wake-up calls ==
NASA began a tradition of playing music to astronauts during the Gemini program, which was first used to wake up a flight crew during Apollo 15. Each track is specially chosen, often by their families, and usually has a special meaning to an individual member of the crew, or is applicable to their daily activities.

Flight Day	Song	Artist/Composer
Day 2	"Back in the Saddle Again"	Gene Autry
Day 3	"The White Eagle"	traditional Russian folk song
Day 4	Overture from The Barber of Seville	Rossini
Day 5	"Arthur's Theme (Best That You Can Do)"	Christopher Cross
Day 6	"Big Boy Toys"	Aaron Tippin
Day 7	"The Marvelous Toy"	Tom Paxton
Day 8	"Time Bomb"	Patrick and Andrew
Day 9	"Hotel California"	The Eagles
Day 10	"Under the Boardwalk"	The Drifters
Day 11	"Brand New Day"	Sting
Day 12	"East Bound and Down"	Jerry Reed
Day 13	"Again"	Lenny Kravitz

== Media ==
STS-105 launches from KSC (3 mins 7 secs)

STS-105 lands at the Shuttle Landing Facility (2 mins 57 secs)

== See also ==
- List of human spaceflights
- List of International Space Station spacewalks
- List of Space Shuttle missions
- List of spacewalks and moonwalks 1965–1999
- Outline of space science
