= Daniel M. Tani =

American astronaut and engineer (born 1961)

Daniel Tani
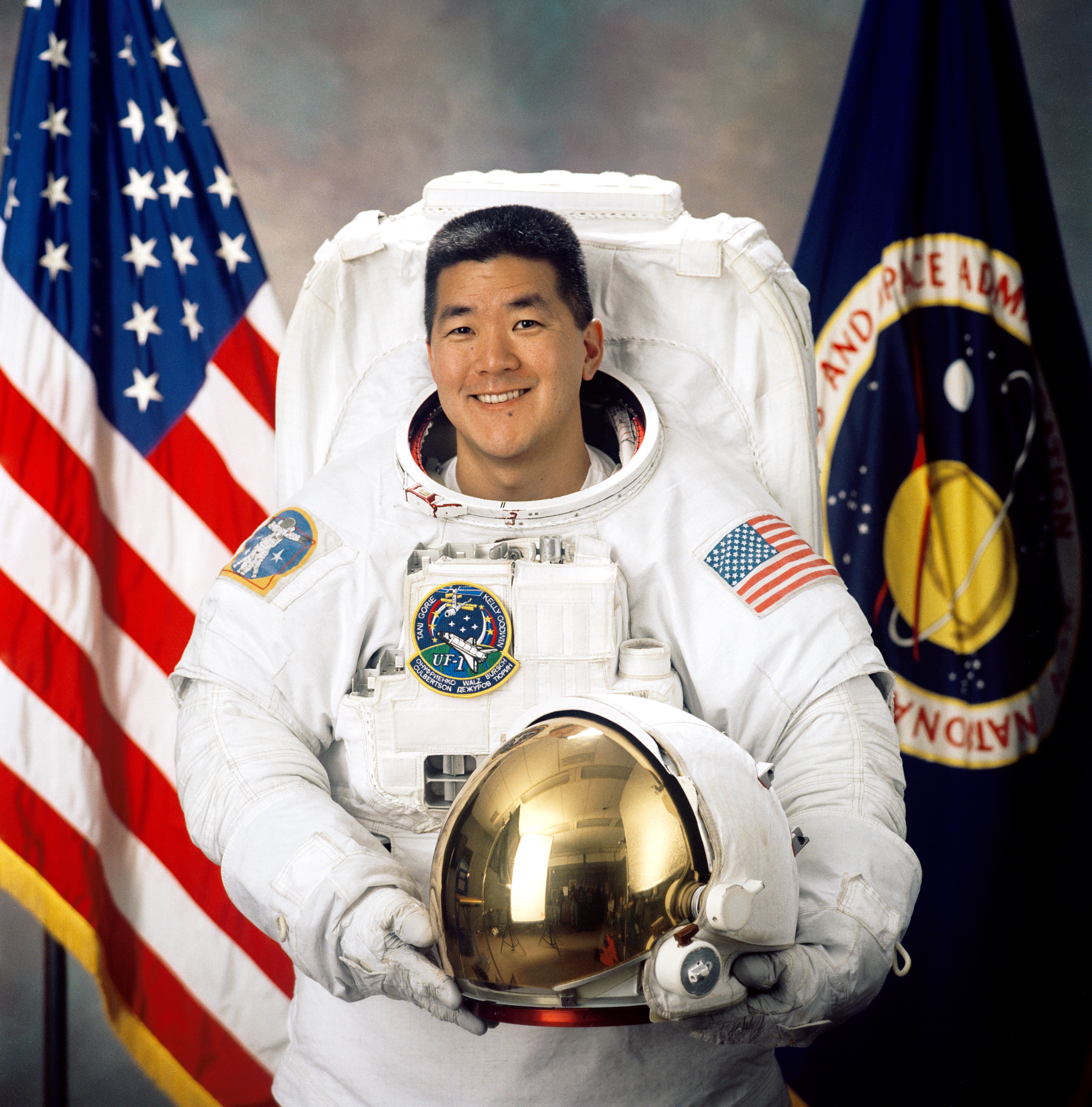
- Tani in 2001
- Born: February 1, 1961 (age 65); Ridley Park, Pennsylvania, U.S.
- Education: Massachusetts Institute of Technology (BS, MS)
- Space career

NASA astronaut
- Time in space: 131d 18h 29m
- Selection: NASA Group 16 (1996)
- Total EVAs: 6
- Total EVA time: 39h, 11m
- Missions: STS-108; STS-120/122 (Expedition 16)
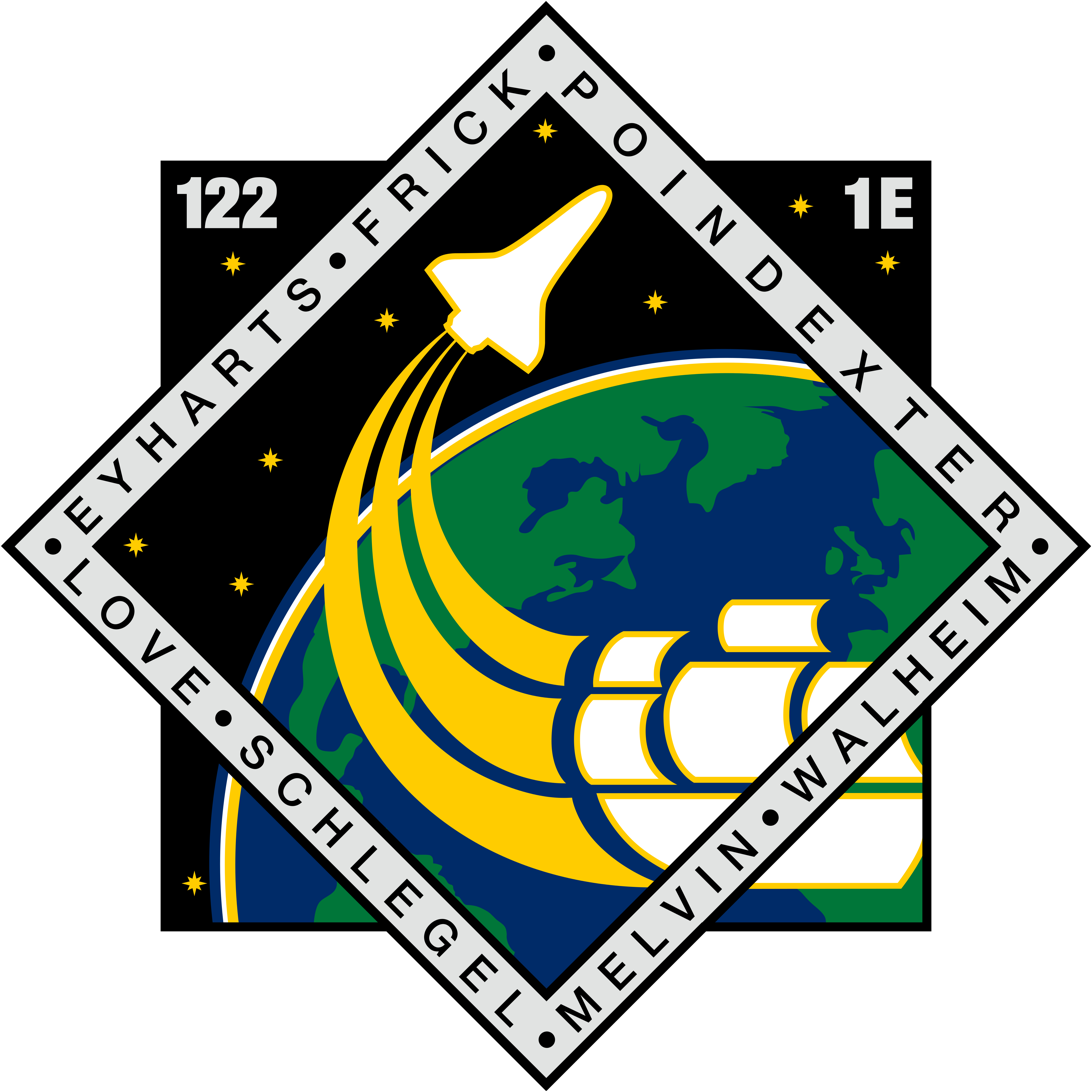
- Mission insignia

Daniel Michio Tani (born February 1, 1961) is an American engineer and retired NASA astronaut. He was born in Ridley Park, Pennsylvania, but considers Lombard, Illinois, to be his hometown.

With Peggy Whitson, Tani conducted the 100th spacewalk on the International Space Station.

== Education ==
Tani graduated from Glenbard East High School, Lombard, Illinois, in 1979, and received a Bachelor of Science and Master of Science degrees in mechanical engineering from Massachusetts Institute of Technology (MIT) in 1984, and 1988, respectively. While at MIT, Tani became a brother of the Lambda Phi chapter of the Alpha Delta Phi fraternity.

Tani's Space suit is featured prominently in the main hallway of Glenbard East High School, where he graduated from in 1979.

== Career ==
After Tani received his bachelor's degree from MIT, he worked at Hughes Aircraft Corporation in El Segundo, California as a design engineer in the Space and Communications group. In 1986, he returned to MIT and received his master's degree in mechanical engineering in 1988, specializing in human factors and group decision making. After graduation, Tani worked for Bolt, Beranek and Newman in Cambridge, Massachusetts, in the experimental psychology department. In 1988, Tani joined Orbital Sciences Corporation (OSC) in Dulles, Virginia, initially as a senior structures engineer, and then as the mission operations manager for the Transfer Orbit Stage (TOS). In that role, he served as the TOS flight operations lead, working with NASA/JSC mission control in support of the deployment of the ACTS/TOS payload during the STS-51 mission in September 1993. Tani then moved to the Pegasus program at OSC as the launch operations manager. In that capacity, he served as lead for the development of procedures and constraints for the launching of the air-launched Pegasus uncrewed rocket. Tani also was responsible for defining, training, and leading the team of engineers who worked in the launch and control room.

== NASA career ==
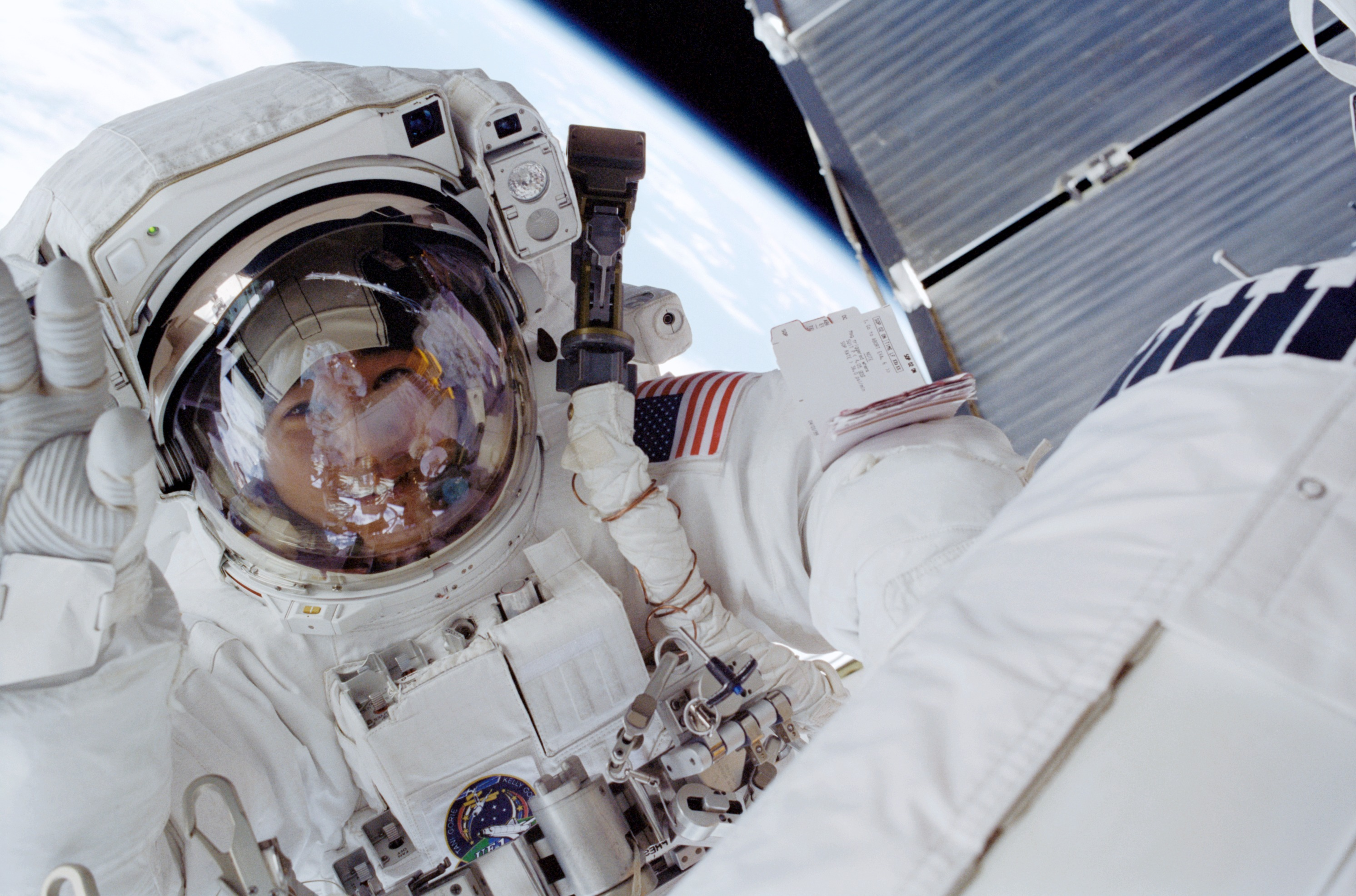
Tani during his STS-108 spacewalk

Selected as an astronaut candidate by NASA in April 1996, Tani reported to the Johnson Space Center in August 1996. After completing two years of training and evaluation, he qualified for flight assignment as a mission specialist in 1998. He performed technical duties in the Astronaut Office Computer Support Branch and Extra-Vehicular Activity (EVA) Branch, and served as a crew support astronaut for Expedition 2.

=== STS-108 ===
Tani flew on STS-108 in 2001, and logged over 11 days in space, including over 4 EVA hours in one spacewalk. STS-108 Endeavour (December 5–17, 2001) was the 12th shuttle flight to visit the International Space Station. During the mission, Tani served as mission specialist 2. Endeavour's crew delivered the Expedition 4 crew to the station, and returned the Expedition 3 crew. The crew transferred over three tons of supplies, logistics and science experiments from the Raffaello Multi-Purpose Logistics Module to the station. Tani performed a spacewalk to wrap thermal blankets around the ISS Solar Array Gimbals. STS-108 was accomplished in 185 Earth orbits, traveling 4.8 million miles in 283 hours and 36 minutes, including an EVA of 4 hours and 12 minutes.

=== NEEMO 2 ===
In May 2002, Tani served as an aquanaut on the NEEMO 2 (NASA Extreme Environment Mission Operations) crew aboard the Aquarius underwater laboratory. Tani and his fellow crew members lived and worked for one week beneath the Atlantic Ocean.

=== Expedition 16 ===
Following his return from STS-108, Tani was assigned as the Expedition 9 backup flight engineer. Tani was eventually assigned to Expedition 16 as flight engineer, and launched to the station aboard STS-120 on October 23, 2007. Tani completed one EVA with the crew of STS-120, and four additional spacewalks during his increment aboard the space station. Originally scheduled to return to Earth with the crew of STS-122 in December, the mission was delayed due to engine cutoff sensor issues during countdown. Instead, it launched on February 7. Tani returned on STS-122 on February 20, 2008.

=== Extra Vehicular Activities ===
Dan Tani has performed six spacewalks or EVAs to date.

Number	Date	Duration	Description
EVA 1	Dec. 10, 2001	04:12	Install thermal blankets over the Beta Gimbal Assemblies (BGAs)
EVA 2	Oct. 28, 2007	06:33	Disconnected the Z1-to-P6 umbilicals, detached P6 from Z1, configured the S1 radiator, installed handrails onto Harmony, and inspected the S4 starboard Solar Alpha Rotary Joint (SARJ).
EVA 3	Nov. 20, 2007	06:40	External outfitting of the Harmony node
EVA 4	Nov. 24, 2007	07:04	External outfitting of the Harmony node
EVA 5	Dec. 18, 2007	06:56	International Space Station solar array issues
EVA 6	Jan. 30, 2008	07:10	Replaced a motor at the base of one of the International Space Station's solar wings

=== Retirement from NASA ===
Tani left NASA in August 2012 to become the vice president of mission and cargo operations in the Advanced Programs Group of Orbital Sciences Corporation in Dulles, Virginia.

In August 2016, Tani left Orbital Sciences Corporation (now Orbital ATK) to join the high school faculty at the American School in Japan, where he taught science, engineering and design.

== Organizations ==
Member, Japanese American Citizens League, Alpha Delta Phi fraternity, and Aircraft Owners and Pilots Association. Patron of Blackrock Castle Observatory, Cork, Ireland.

== Awards ==
- Orbital Sciences Corporation Outstanding Technical Achievement Award, 1993
- Medal "For Merit in Space Exploration" (Russia, 12 April 2011) – for outstanding contribution to the development of international cooperation in crewed space flight

== Personal life ==
Tani is married to Jane Egan from Cork, Ireland, and enjoys golf, flying, running, tennis, music, and cooking. Tani threw out the ceremonial first pitch and sang the "Take Me Out to the Ball Game" at Wrigley Field on August 20, 2008.

His parents, Rose and Henry N. Tani, are both deceased. During World War II, they and their children were relocated from their California farm to the Tanforan Assembly Center in San Bruno, where they lived for several months in converted horse stables at the Tanforan Racetrack, and then Topaz War Relocation Center in Utah as part of the Japanese American internment program of the U.S. government. On December 19, 2007, during Tani's stay on the International Space Station as a member of Expedition 16, he was informed by the ground team that his mother had been killed when a freight train collided with her car.

== See also ==
- List of Asian American astronauts
