= Frank L. Culbertson Jr. =

American naval officer, aviator, and astronaut (born 1949)

Frank Culbertson
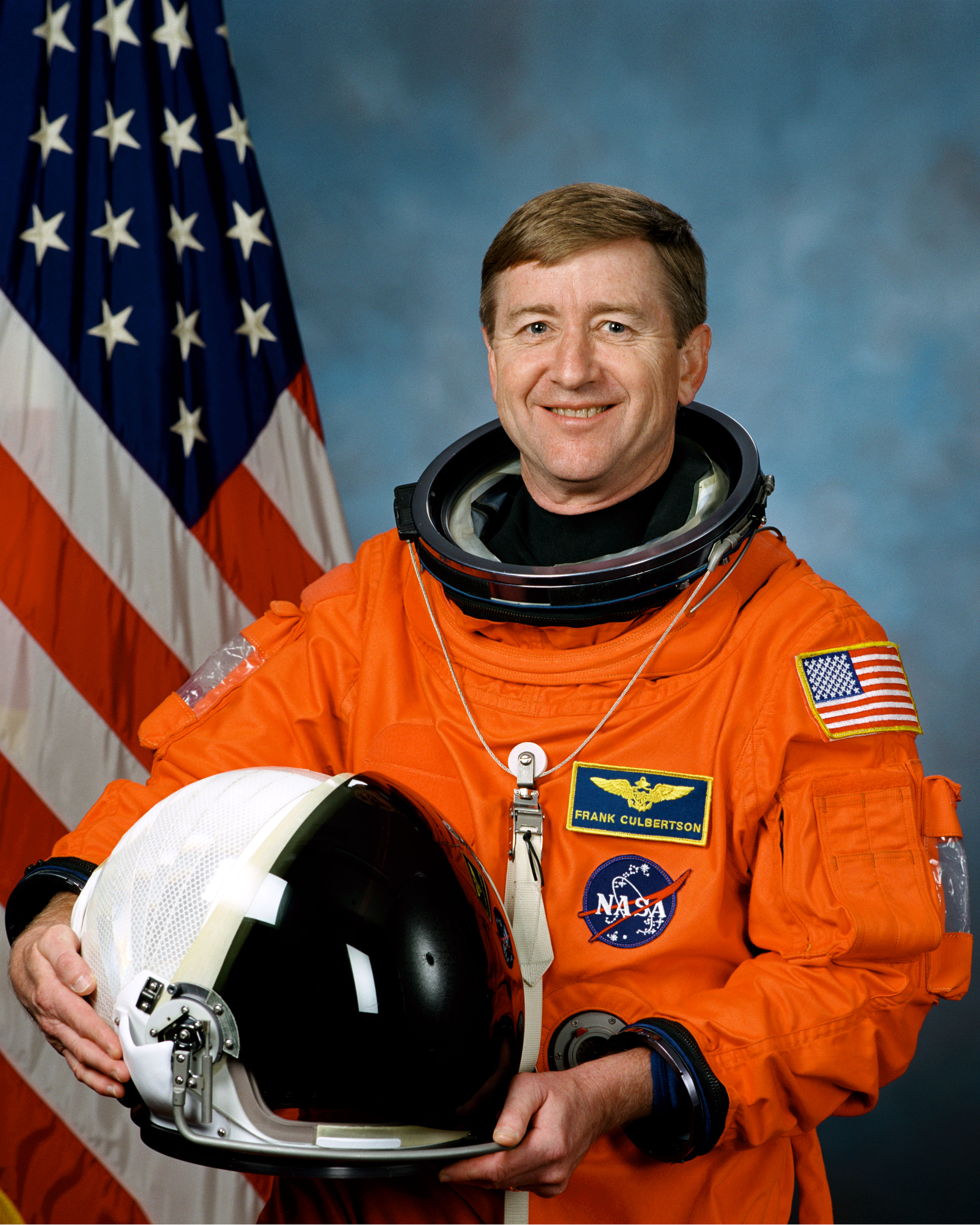
- Culbertson in 2001
- Born: Frank Lee Culbertson Jr. May 15, 1949 (age 77); Charleston, South Carolina, U.S.
- Education: United States Naval Academy (BS)
- Awards: Legion of Merit; Defense Superior Service Medal; Distinguished Flying Cross; Medal "For Merit in Space Exploration"
- Space career

NASA astronaut
- Rank: Captain, USN
- Time in space: 143d 14h 50m
- Selection: NASA Group 10 (1984)
- Total EVAs: 1
- Total EVA time: 5h 4m
- Missions: STS-38; STS-51; Expedition 3 (STS-105 / STS-108)
- Retired: August 24, 2002

Frank Lee Culbertson Jr. (born May 15, 1949) (Capt, USN, Ret.) is an American former naval officer and aviator, test pilot, aerospace engineer, NASA astronaut, graduate of the US Naval Academy, and member of the United States Astronaut Hall of Fame. He served as the commander of the International Space Station for almost four months in 2001 and was the only U.S. citizen not on Earth when the September 11 attacks occurred.

== Early life and education ==
Culbertson was born on May 15, 1949, in Charleston, South Carolina, but considers Holly Hill, South Carolina, to be his hometown. He has five children and nine grandchildren.

Culbertson was a Boy Scout and earned the rank of Second Class. He graduated from Holly Hill High School in 1967, and received a Bachelor of Science degree in aerospace engineering from the United States Naval Academy in 1971. He was a member of varsity rowing and wrestling teams at U.S. Naval Academy.

== United States Navy service ==
Upon graduation from the U.S. Naval Academy in 1971, Culbertson served aboard USS Fox in the Gulf of Tonkin prior to reporting to flight training in Pensacola, Florida.

After designation as a naval aviator at Beeville, Texas, in May 1973, he flew F-4 Phantom aircraft with VF-121 at NAS Miramar, California; with VF-151 aboard the aircraft carrier USS Midway, permanently homeported in Yokosuka, Japan; and with the U.S. Air Force in the 426th Tactical Fighter Training Squadron at Luke Air Force Base, Arizona, where he served as weapons and tactics instructor. Culbertson then served as the catapult and arresting gear officer for USS John F. Kennedy until May 1981 when he was selected to attend the U.S. Naval Test Pilot School, NAS Patuxent River, Maryland.

Following graduation with distinction in June 1982, he was assigned to the Carrier Systems Branch of the Strike Aircraft Test Directorate where he served as program manager for all F-4 testing and as a test pilot for automatic carrier landing system tests and carrier suitability. He was engaged in fleet replacement training in the F-14 Tomcat at VF-101, NAS Oceana, Virginia, from January 1984 until his selection for the astronaut candidate program.

He logged over 9,000 hours flying time in 62 different types of aircraft and made 450 carrier landings, including over 350 arrested landings, and numerous tests of the Automated Carrier Landing System.

== NASA career ==
Selected as a NASA astronaut candidate in May 1984, Culbertson completed basic astronaut training in June 1985. Technical assignments since then included: member of the team that redesigned and tested the Space Shuttle nosewheel steering, tires, and brakes; member of the launch support team at Kennedy Space Center for Shuttle flights STS-61-A, STS-61-B, STS-61-C, and STS-51-L; in 1986 he worked at the NASA Headquarters Action Center in Washington, D.C., assisting with the Challenger accident investigations conducted by NASA, the Presidential Commission, and U.S. Congress.

He became lead astronaut at the Shuttle Avionics Integration Laboratory (SAIL); lead of the First Emergency Egress Team; and lead spacecraft communicator (CAPCOM) in the Mission Control Center for seven missions (STS-27, STS-29, STS-30, STS-28, STS-34, STS-33, and STS-32 [note that Shuttle missions are ordered chronologically]). Following his first flight, he served as the Deputy Chief of the Flight Crew Operations Space Station Support Office, as well as the lead astronaut for Space Station Safety. He was also a member of the team evaluating the hardware and procedures for the proposed mission to dock with the Russian Space Station Mir. Following STS-51, Culbertson was Chief of the Astronaut Office Mission Support Branch; then Chief of the Johnson Space Center Russian Projects Office.

In 1994, Culbertson was named Deputy Program Manager, Phase 1 Shuttle-Mir, and in 1995 became Manager of the Shuttle-Mir Program. He was responsible for a multi-national team which executed nine Shuttle docking missions to the Russian Space Station Mir, with seven astronauts spending 30 months cumulatively on board the Mir Station, plus all the associated science and docking hardware to ensure the success of the joint program, a precursor to the building of the joint International Space Station. Culbertson also spent one year as Deputy Program Manager for Operations of the International Space Station Program.

Culbertson retired from NASA in August 2002 to pursue interests in private industry.

=== Spaceflight experience ===
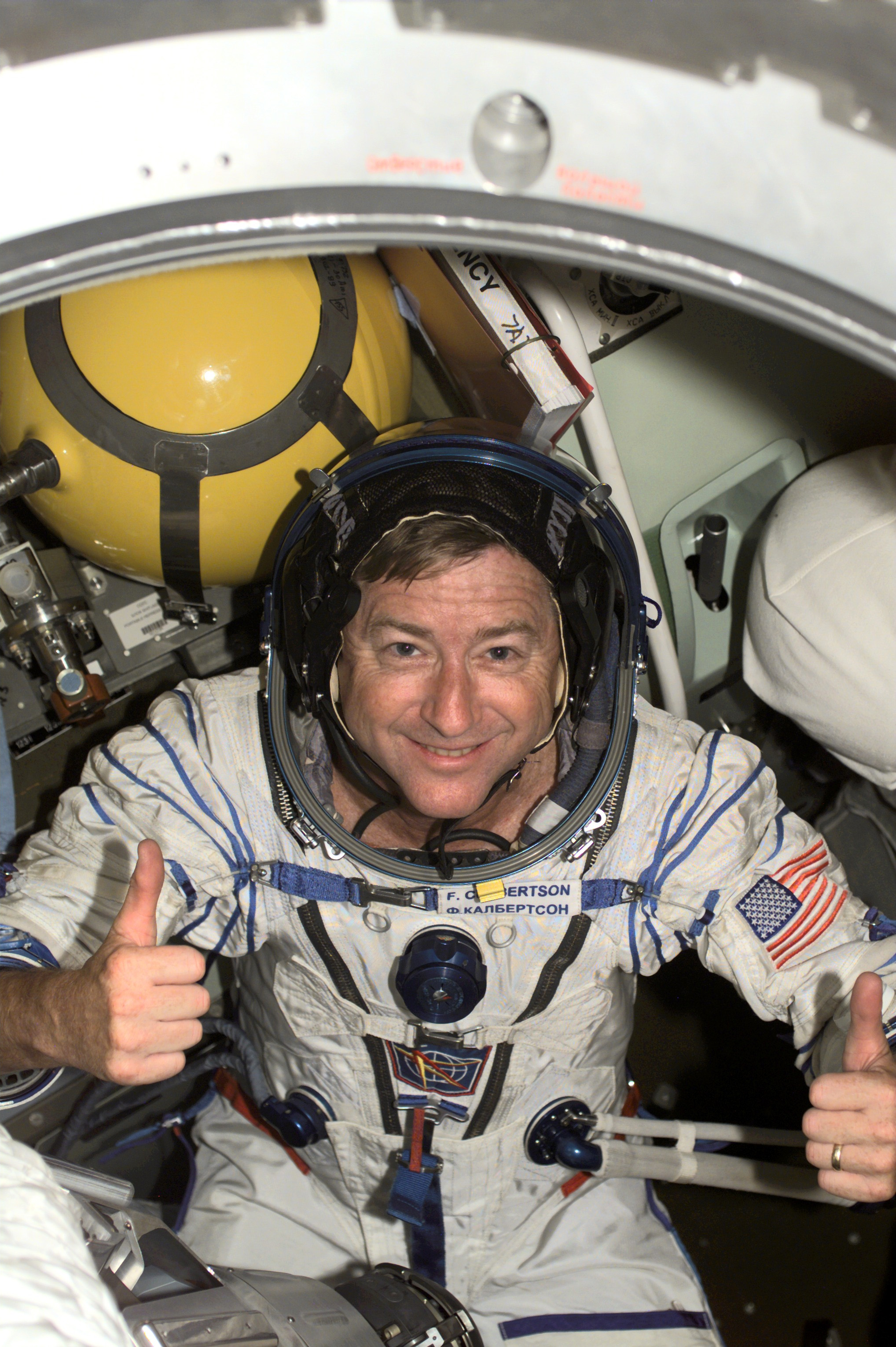
Culbertson as the ISS-03 Commander

A veteran of three space flights, Culbertson has logged over 143 days in space.

STS-38 Atlantis (November 15–20, 1990) was a five-day mission during which the crew conducted Department of Defense operations. The mission concluded after 80 orbits of the Earth in 117 hours, 54 minutes, 28 seconds, the first Shuttle to land in Florida since 1985.

STS-51 Discovery (September 12–22, 1993) was a ten-day mission during which the crew deployed the U.S. Advanced Communications Technology Satellite (ACTS/TOS), and the Shuttle Pallet Satellite (ORFEUS/SPAS) carrying U.S. and German scientific experiments, including an ultraviolet spectrometer. A seven-hour EVA was also conducted to evaluate Hubble Space Telescope repair tools and methods. After the SPAS spacecraft had completed six days of free flight some 40 miles from Discovery, the crew completed a successful rendezvous and recovered the SPAS with the Shuttle's robot arm. The mission concluded with the first night landing of the Shuttle at the Kennedy Space Center. Mission duration was 158 Earth orbits in 236 hours and 11 minutes.

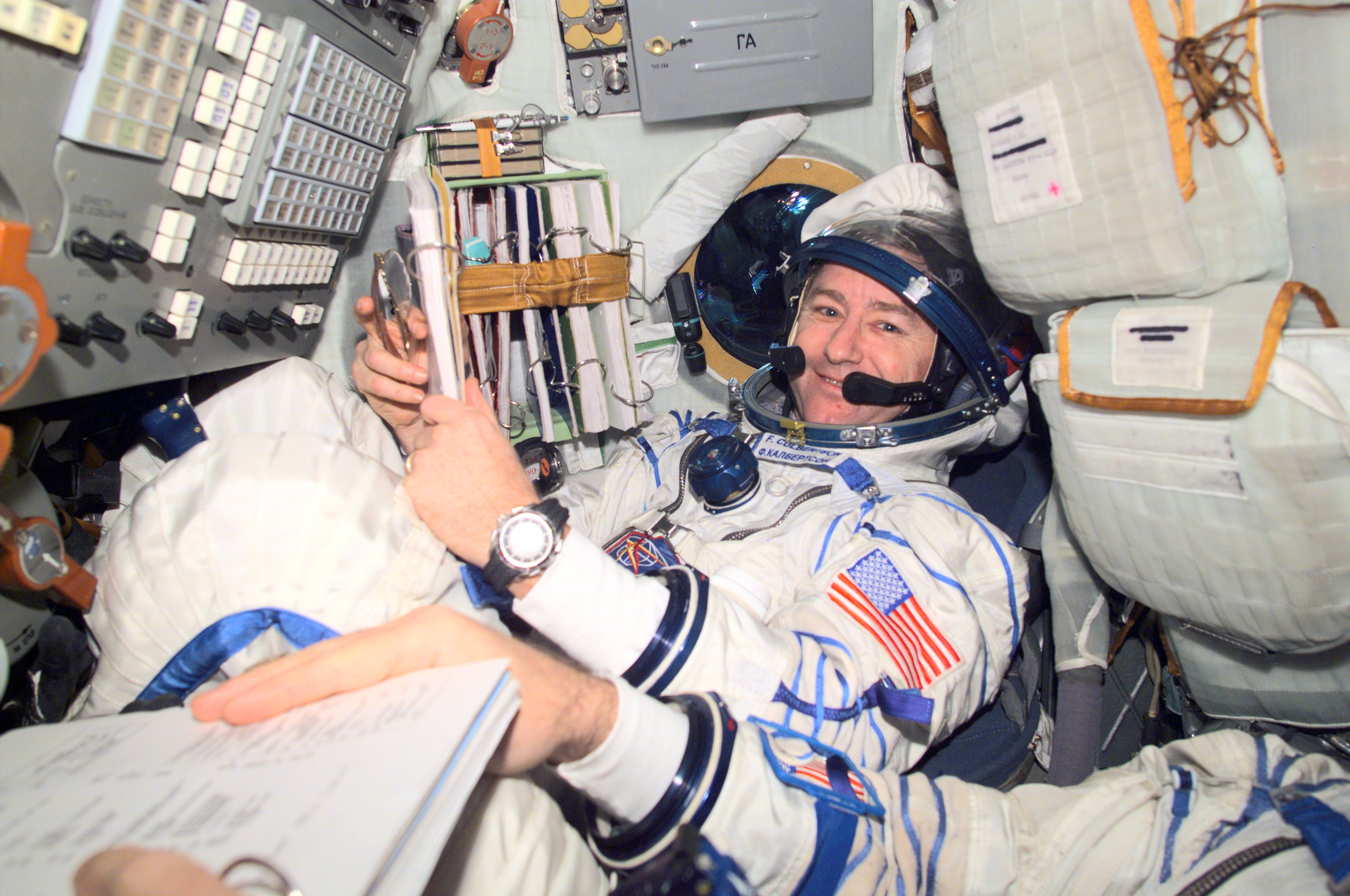
Culbertson inside Soyuz TM-32 during its moving to another docking port

The Expedition 3 crew launched on August 10, 2001, aboard STS-105 Discovery and docked with the International Space Station on August 12, 2001. Culbertson lived and worked aboard the station for a total of 129 days, and was in command of the station for 117 days. He was the only American not to be on Earth during the September 11 attacks. As the ISS passed over the New York City area after the attacks, Culbertson took photographs of the smoke emanating from Ground Zero in lower Manhattan. He later learned that the plane that struck the Pentagon had been piloted (at takeoff) by his Naval Academy classmate Charles Burlingame. The two had been aeronautical engineering majors together, and had been F-4 fighter pilots. Culbertson had his trumpet onboard ISS, and with their Academy class having their 30th reunion, he played "Taps," which he felt was especially fitting in that the two had also played in the academy's Drum & Bugle Corps together. The Expedition 3 crew left the station on December 15 aboard STS-108 Endeavour, landing at Kennedy Space Center, Florida, on December 17, 2001.

== Post-NASA career ==
In September 2002, Culbertson joined SAIC as Senior its Vice President and Program Manager for the Safety, Reliability and Quality Assurance (SR&QA) contract with NASA. In 2008, he moved to Orbital Sciences Corporation to lead the company’s COTS, CRS and other human spaceflight programs.

With purchase of Orbital by Northrop Grumman, Culbertson became President of the Space Systems Group at Northrop Grumman Innovation Systems, where he was responsible for the execution, business development, and financial performance of the company's human spaceflight, science, commercial communications, and national security satellite activities, as well as technical services to various government customers. These include some of Northrop Grumman's largest programs such as NASA's Commercial Resupply Services (CRS) initiatives to the International Space Station (ISS) as well as various national security-related programs.

In 2018, Culbertson retired from Northrop Grumman. In December 2020, he joined the Board of Directors of the Space Foundation.

== Organizations ==
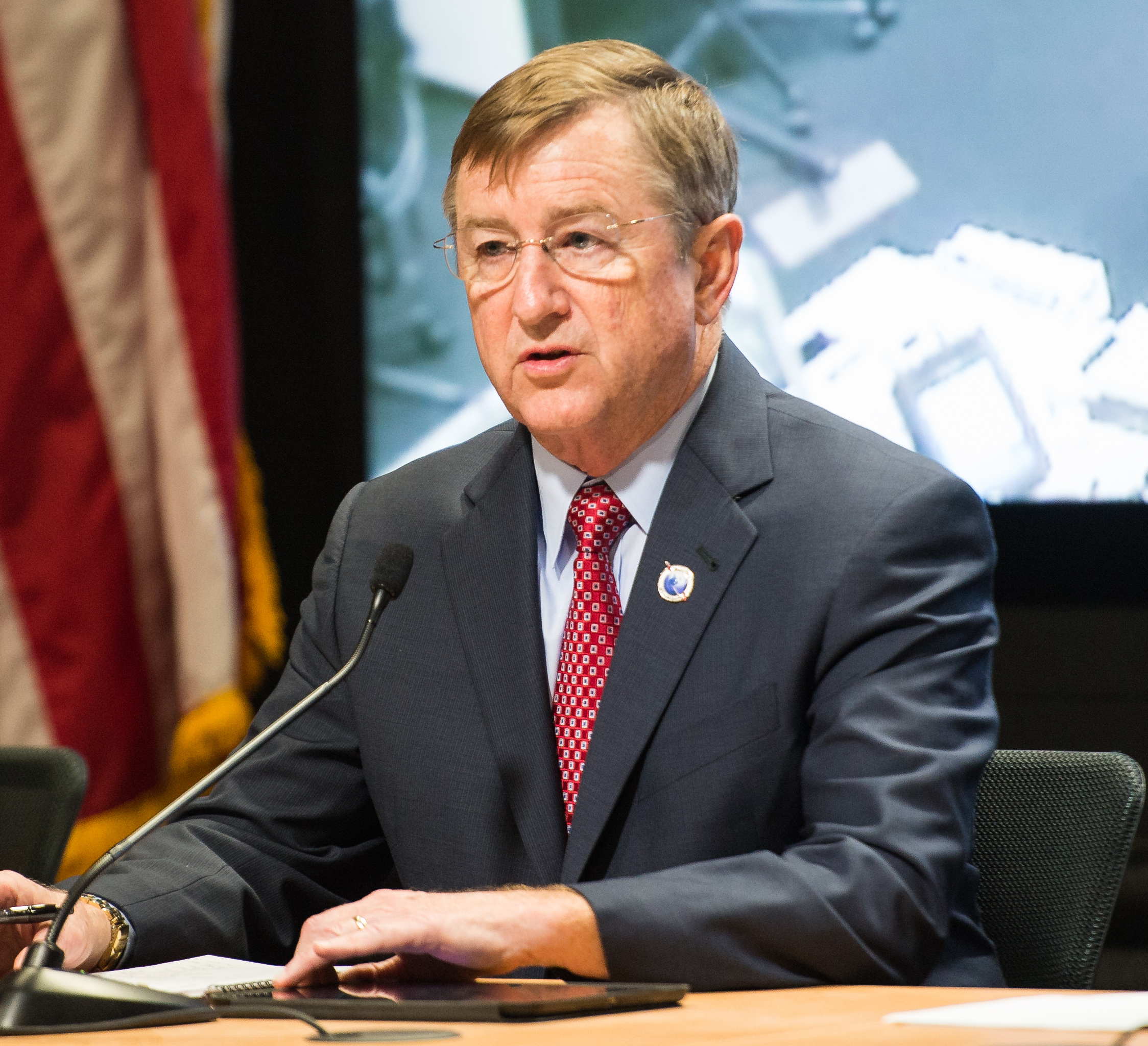
Culbertson at Antares press conference in 2014

He is a member of a number of organisations, including the American Institute of Aeronautics and Astronautics (senior fellow), the Association of Naval Aviators, the Aircraft Owners & Pilots Association, the Aviation Boatswains Mates Association, and the Association of Space Explorers.

== Awards and honors ==
Culbertson has received numerous awards, including the Legion of Merit, the Distinguished Flying Cross, the Defense Superior Service Medal, the NASA Outstanding Leadership Medal, NASA Space Flight Medals, Navy Commendation Medal, Air Force Commendation Medal, the Armed Forces Expeditionary Medal, the Humanitarian Service Medal, and various other unit and service awards. Distinguished graduate, U.S. Naval Test Pilot School. He has been awarded Honorary Doctor of Science Degrees from the College of Charleston, 1994, and Lander University, 1999; he has also been awarded the Komarov Certificate for Space Flight Achievement, 1994, the AAS Flight Achievement Award for STS-51, 1994, Aviation Week & Space Technology 1997 Laurel for Achievement in Space, IEEE/ASME Award for Manager of the Year, 1997, and the Space Center Rotary Club Stellar Award for 1998. Inducted into the U.S. Astronaut Hall of Fame in 2010 and the South Carolina Aviation Hall of Fame in 1997. Designated a Fellow of AIAA in 2013.
