= Expedition 3 =

2001 expedition to the International Space Station

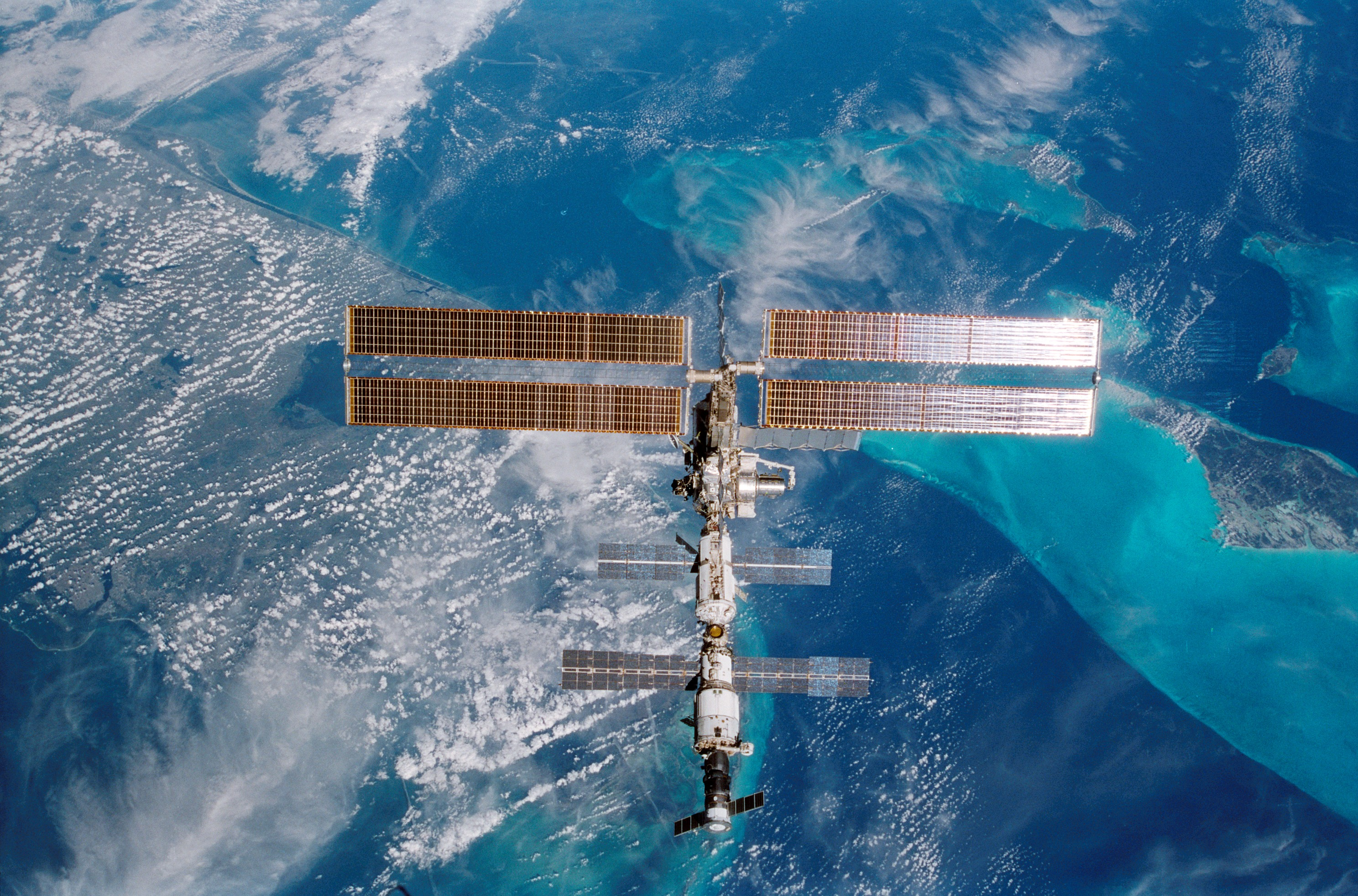
- Zenith view of the International Space Station in December 2001, at the end of Expedition 3.
- Mission type: Long-duration expedition
- Mission duration: 124 days, 22 hours, 47 minutes (at ISS); 128 days, 20 hours, 45 minutes, 58 seconds (launch to landing)
- Distance travelled: 85,860,485 kilometres (53,351,232 mi)
- Orbits completed: 2,020

Expedition
- Space station: International Space Station
- Began: 12 August 2001, 18:41 UTC
- Ended: 15 December 2001, 17:28 UTC
- Arrived aboard: STS-105; Space Shuttle Discovery
- Departed aboard: STS-108; Space Shuttle Endeavour

Crew
- Crew size: 3
- Members: Frank L. Culbertson Jr. Vladimir Dezhurov; Mikhail Tyurin
- EVAs: 4
- EVA duration: 17 hours, 50 minutes
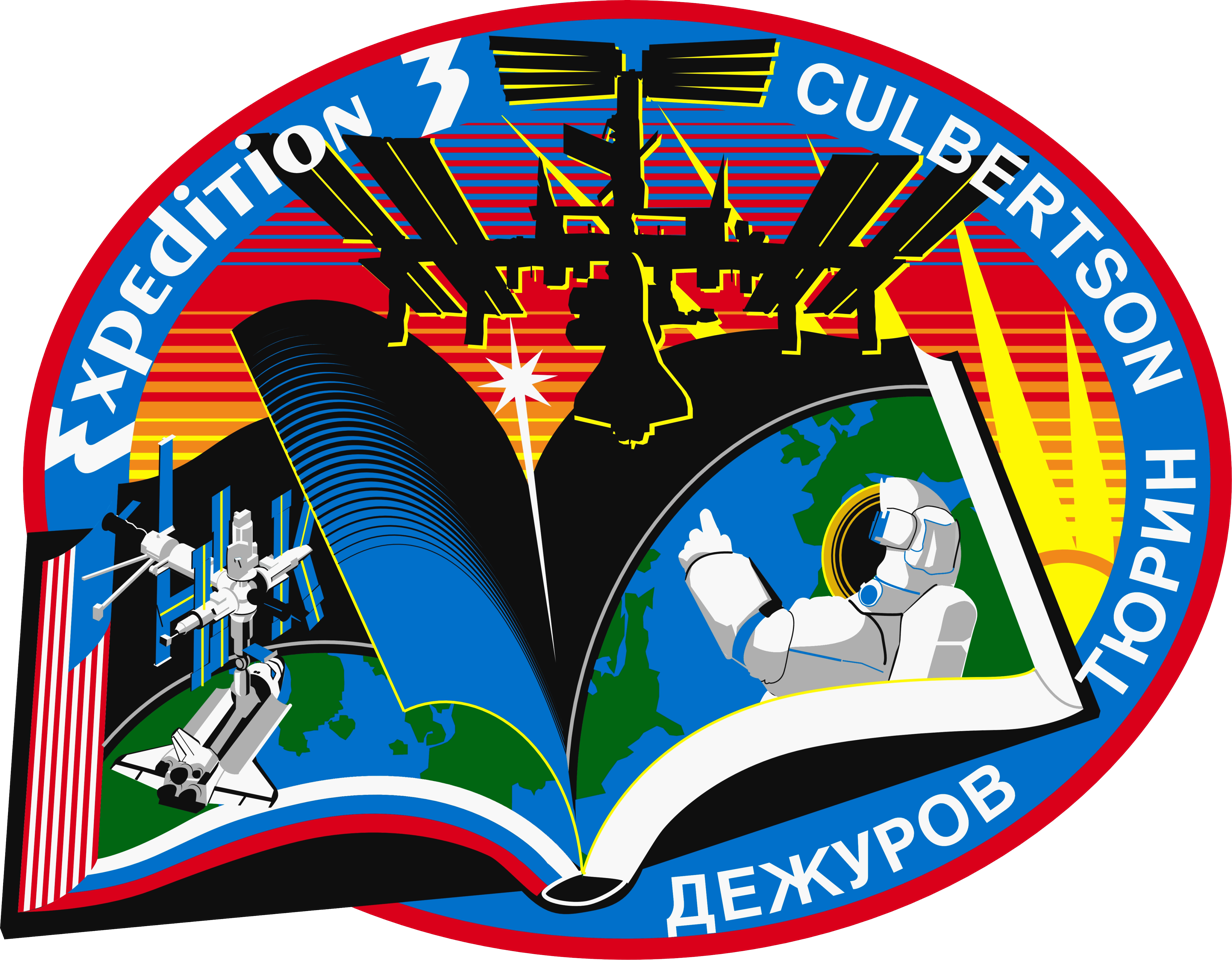
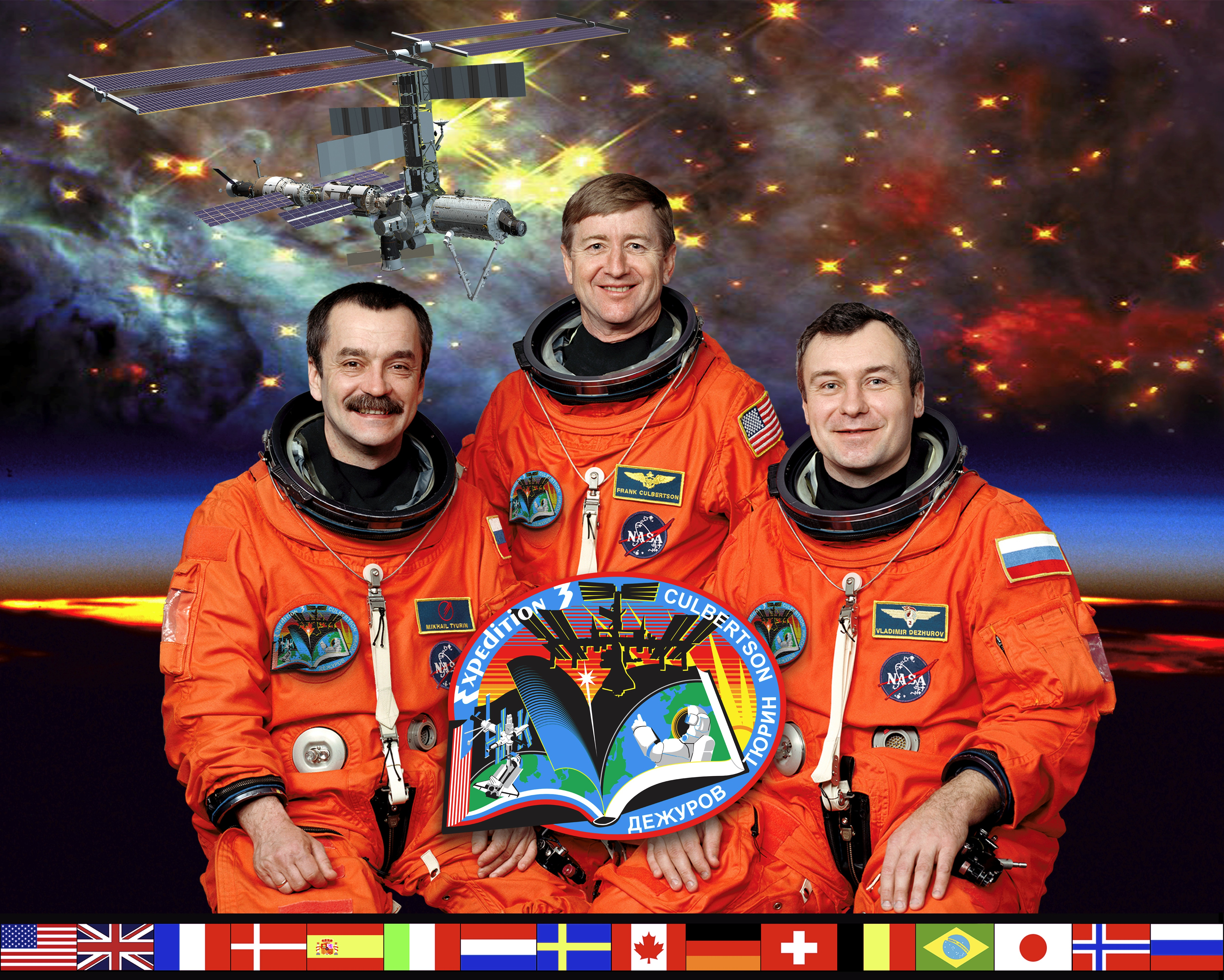
- Expedition 3 mission patch L-R: Mikhail Tyurin, Frank L. Culbertson Jr., and Vladimir Dezhurov ISS expeditions

Expedition 3 was the third expedition to the International Space Station. Commander Frank L. Culbertson Jr. was the only American crew member, and as such the only American not on Earth during the 9/11 attacks, which the crew photographed and videotaped from the ISS.

== Crew ==
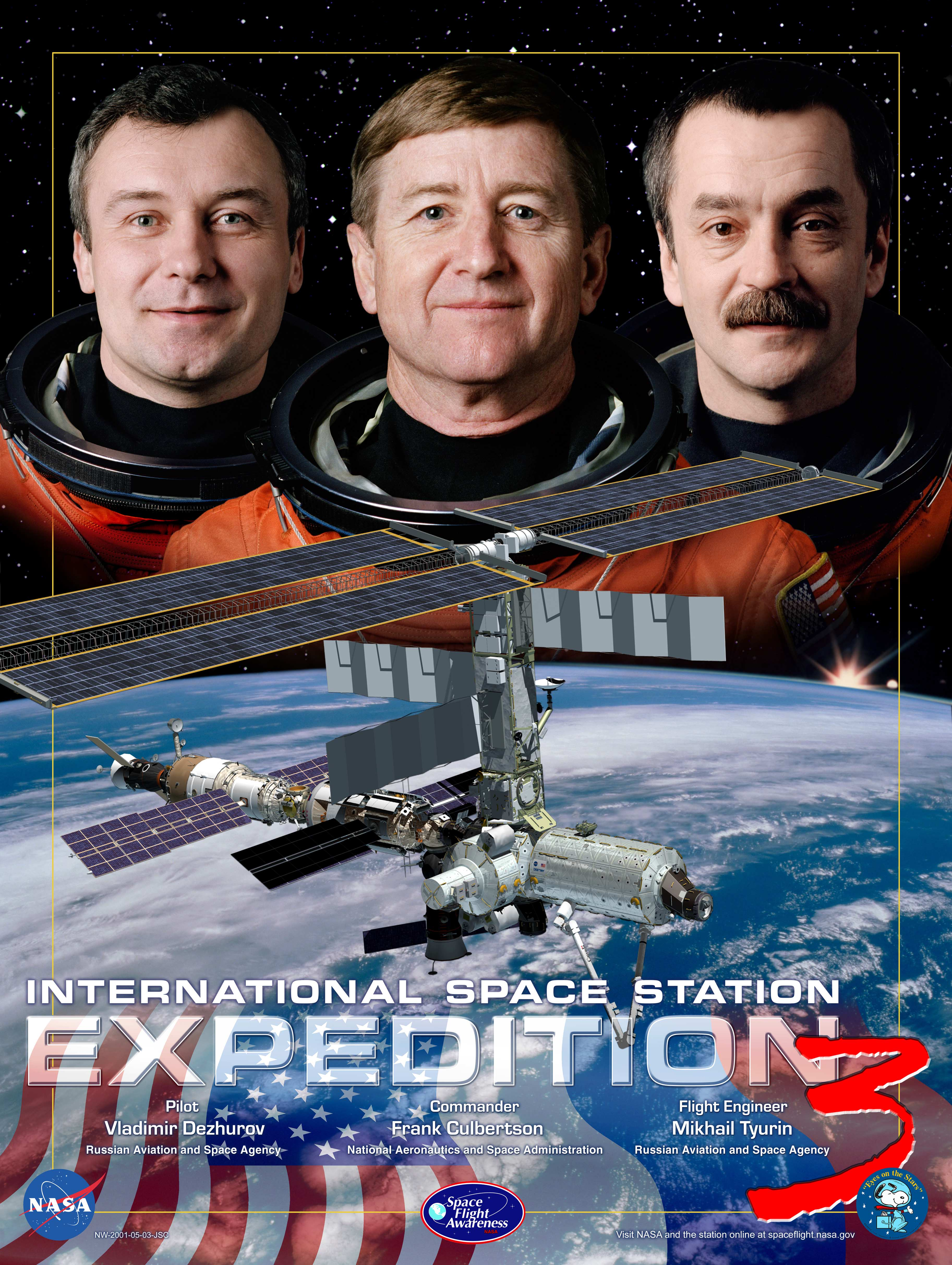
Expedition 3 promotional poster

Prime crew
Position	Astronaut
Commander	Frank Culbertson, NASA; Third and last spaceflight
Flight Engineer	Vladimir Dezhurov, RSA; Second and last spaceflight
Flight Engineer	Mikhail Tyurin, RSA; First spaceflight

Backup crew
Position	Astronaut
Commander	Valery Korzun, RSA
Flight Engineer	Peggy Whitson, NASA
Flight Engineer	Sergei Treshchev, RSA

== Mission objectives ==
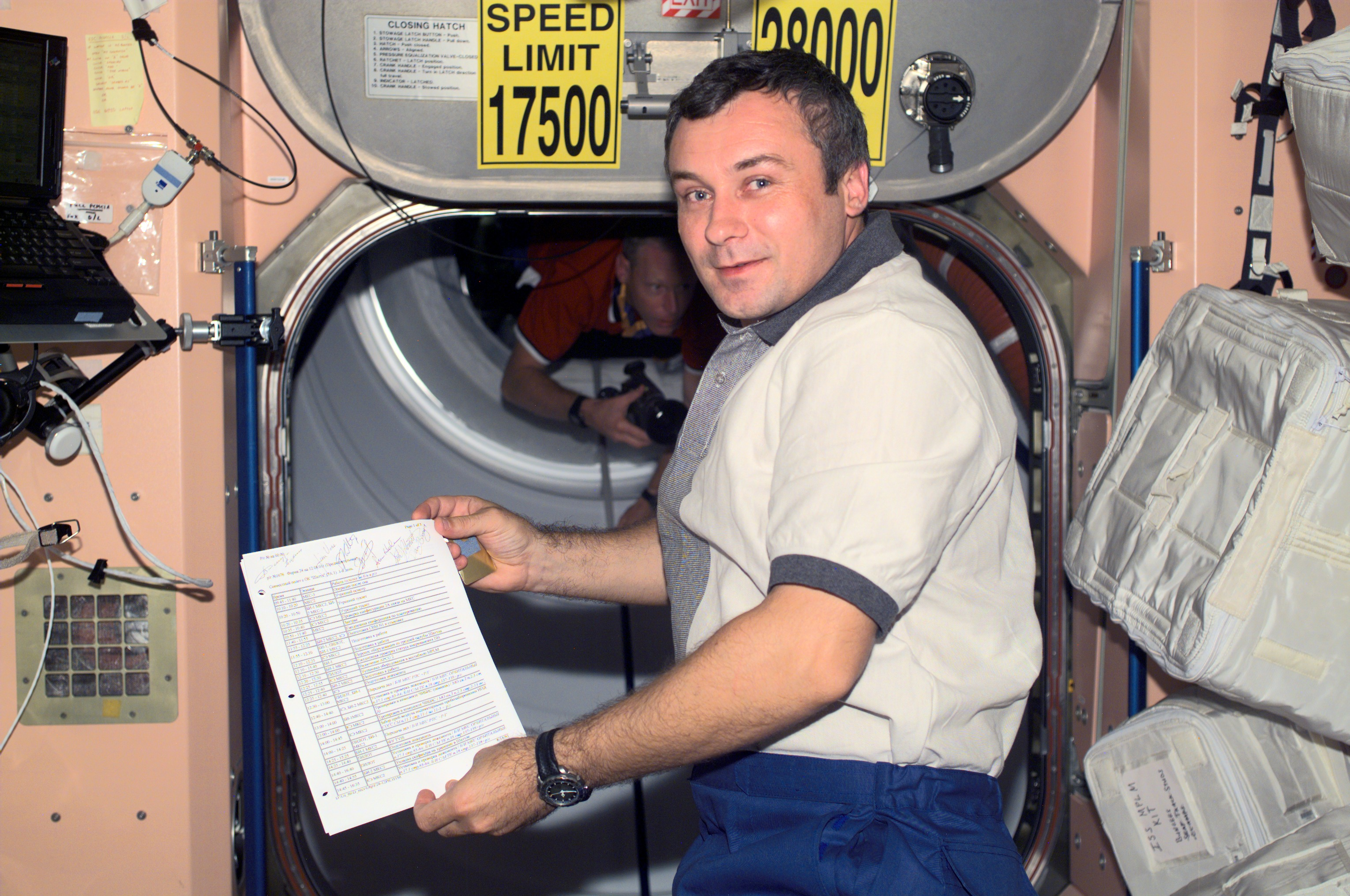
Vladimir N. Dezhurov, Expedition Three flight engineer in Node 1 on the International Space Station. (Note the speed limit signs on the hatch)

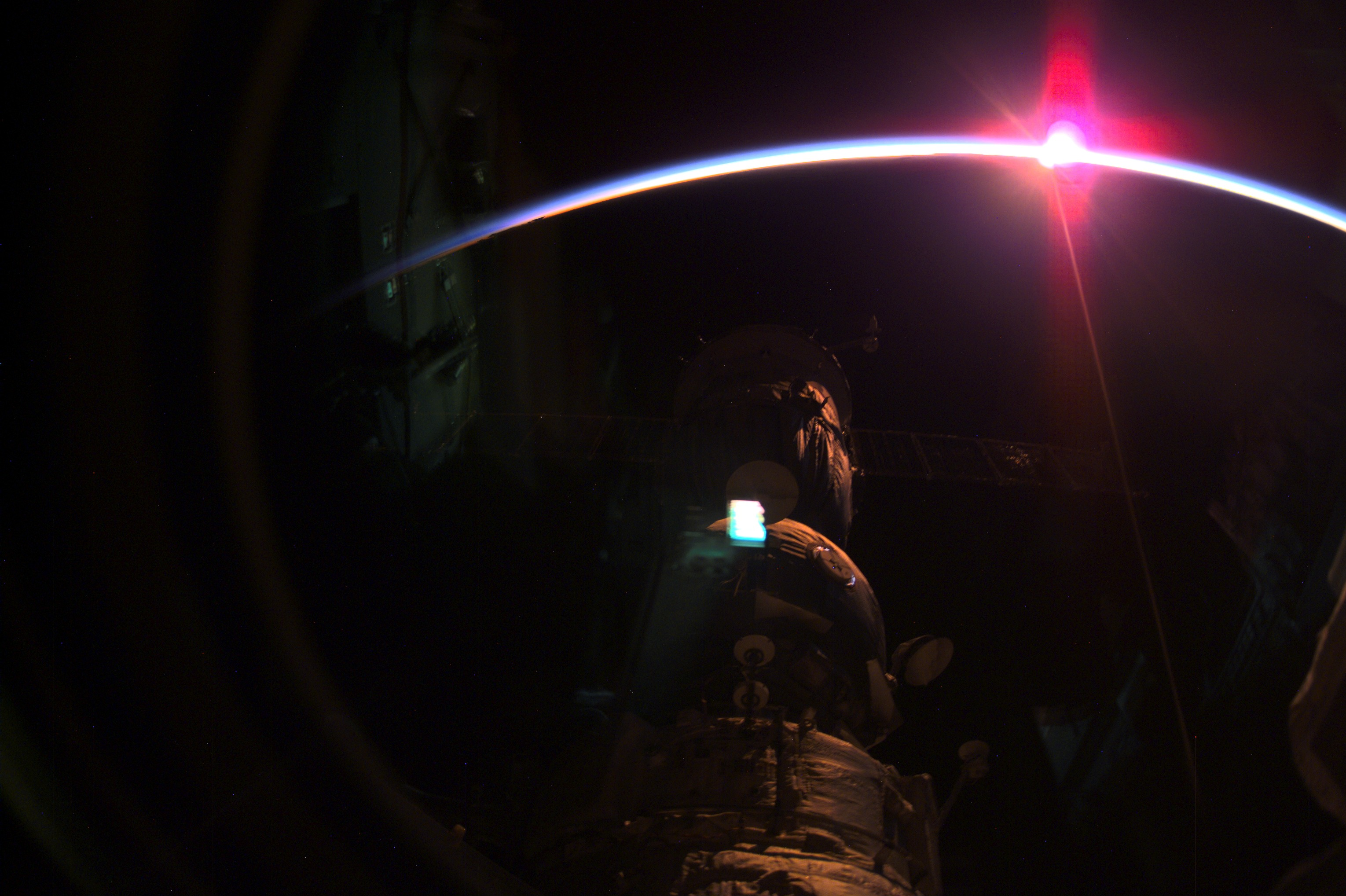
A setting sun and the thin blue airglow line at Earth's horizon photographed by an Expedition 3 crew member.

Research in space begun by two previous crews aboard the International Space Station (ISS) expanded during the Expedition Three mission. The third resident crew launched on 10 August 2001 on Space Shuttle Discovery during mission STS-105 and took control of the complex on 13 August 2001. The crew conducted a science-intensive increment and completed four spacewalks. The Expedition Three crew ended their 117-day residency on board the ISS on 8 December 2001 when their custom Soyuz seat-liners were transferred to Space Shuttle Endeavour for the return trip home during mission STS-108.

The Expedition Three crew of the International Space Station enjoyed a unique view of the 2001 Leonid meteor storm. "It looked like we were seeing UFOs approaching the earth flying in formation, three or four at a time," recalls astronaut Frank Culbertson. "There were hundreds per minute going beneath us, really spectacular!" News reports had warned sky watchers in advance: On 18 November 2001, Earth was due to plow through a minefield of debris shed by Comet Tempel-Tuttle. Innumerable bits of comet dust would become meteors when they hit Earth's atmosphere at 144,000 miles per hour (64,000 m/s). Experts predicted an unforgettable display ... and it came. Millions of people saw the show, but only three of them—the ones on board the space station—saw it from above. "We had to look down to see the meteors," says Culbertson. "That's because the atmosphere (where comet dust burns up) is below the station."

An international crew of three were the third crew to live aboard the International Space Station. The team was led by American Commander Frank Culbertson, and joined by Russian crewmates Vladimir Dezhurov, mission pilot, and flight engineer Mikhail Tyurin. As a part of the STS-105 mission, Discovery delivered the Expedition 3 crew to the station. During their four-month stay, the crew saw the orbital complex expand and research work grow. The Expedition 3 crew returned home on mission STS-108.

== Spacewalks ==
All four of the spacewalks during Expedition 3 were completed using the Russian Orlan spacesuit and from the Pirs air lock on the Russian segment of the International Space Station.

Mission	Spacewalkers	Start (UTC)	End (UTC)	Duration
Expedition 3 EVA 1	Vladimir Dezhurov; Mikhail Tyurin	8 October 2001; 14:23	8 October 2001; 19:21	4 hours 58 minutes
Expedition 3 EVA 1	Dezhurov and Tyurin made connections between Pirs and the station's Zvezda Service Module. The spacewalkers installed a cable that will allow space walk radio communications between the two station sections. They also installed handrails on the new compartment. Then, they installed an exterior ladder that will be used to help spacewalkers leave Pirs' hatch. Tyurin and Dezhurov installed a Strela cargo crane onto the station.			
Expedition 3 EVA 2	Dezhurov; Tyurin	15 October 2001; 09:17	15 October 2001; 15:09	5 hours 52 minutes
Expedition 3 EVA 2	Dezhurov and Tyurin installed Russian commercial experiments on the exterior of Pirs. Among the experiments is a set of investigations of how various materials react to the space environment over a long time. Called MPAC-SEEDS, the investigation is housed in three briefcase-sized containers.			
Expedition 3 EVA 3	Dezhurov; Frank Culbertson	12 November 2001; 21:41	13 November 2001; 02:45	5 hours 4 minutes
Expedition 3 EVA 3	Dezhurov and Culbertson connected cables on the exterior of Pirs for the Kurs automated docking system. They completed checks of the Strela cargo crane, using one space walker at the end of the crane's boom to simulate a cargo. They also inspected and photographed a small panel of one solar array on the Zvezda Service Module that has one portion of a panel not fully unfolded.			
Expedition 3 EVA 4	Dezhurov; Tyurin	3 December 2001; 13:20	3 December 2001; 16:06	2 hours 46 minutes
Expedition 3 EVA 4	Dezhurov and Tyurin removed an obstruction that prevented a Progress resupply ship from firmly docking with the International Space Station. They also took pictures of the debris, which was a rubber seal from the previous cargo ship, and of the docking interface.			

== Mission patch ==
The Expedition 3 mission patch depicts the book of space history, turning from the chapter with the Russian space station Mir and the space shuttle to the next chapter, one that will be written on the blank pages of the future by space explorers working for the benefit of the entire world. Above the book is a layout of what the station will look like when completed, docked with the space shuttle.

== 9/11 satellite pictures ==
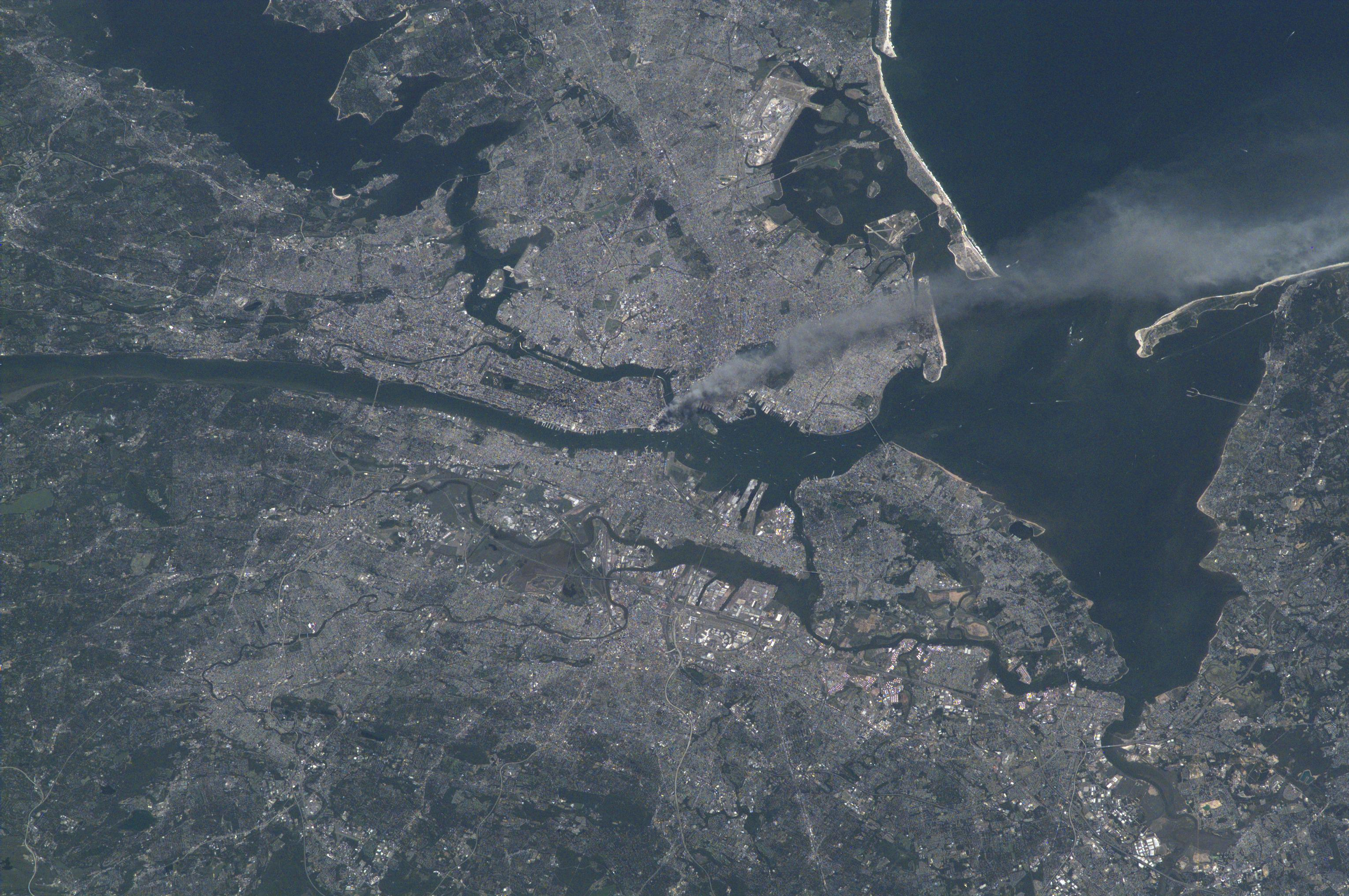
ISS picture of New York City on 9/11

On 11 September 2001, the International Space Station passed over New York City and astronaut Frank L. Culbertson Jr. photographed the smoke clouds billowing from the World Trade Center site in Downtown Manhattan.
