= STS-108 =

2001 American crewed spaceflight to the ISS

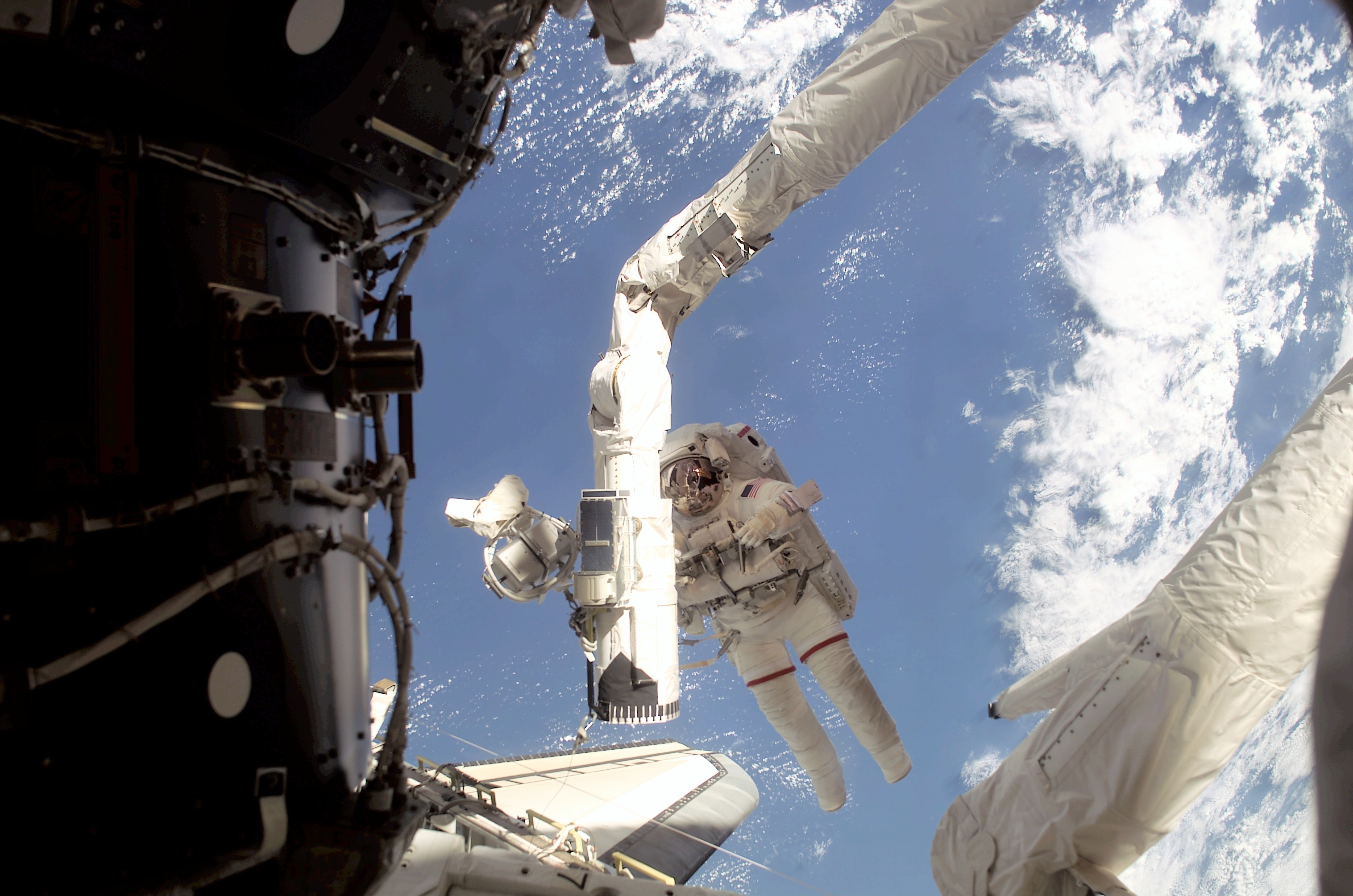
- Astronaut Linda M. Godwin on Endeavour's Canadarm during an EVA
- Names: Space Transportation System-108
- Mission type: ISS crew rotation
- Operator: NASA
- COSPAR ID: 2001-054A
- SATCAT no.: 26995
- Mission duration: 11 days, 19 hours, 36 minutes, 45 seconds
- Distance travelled: 7,700,000 kilometres (4,800,000 mi)

Spacecraft properties
- Spacecraft: Space Shuttle Endeavour
- Payload mass: 4,082 kilograms (8,999 lb)

Crew
- Crew size: 7
- Members: Dominic L. Pudwill Gorie; Mark E. Kelly; Linda M. Godwin; Daniel M. Tani
- Launching: Yury I. Onufriyenko; Carl E. Walz; Daniel W. Bursch
- Landing: Frank L. Culbertson, Jr.; Mikhail Tyurin; Vladimir N. Dezhurov
- EVAs: 1
- EVA duration: 4 hours, 12 minutes

Start of mission
- Launch date: 5 December 2001 22:19:28 UTC
- Launch site: Kennedy, LC-39B

End of mission
- Landing date: 17 December 2001 17:56:13 UTC
- Landing site: Kennedy, SLF Runway 15

Orbital parameters
- Reference system: Geocentric
- Regime: Low Earth
- Perigee altitude: 353 kilometres (219 mi)
- Apogee altitude: 377 kilometres (234 mi)
- Inclination: 51.6 degrees
- Period: 92 minutes

Docking with ISS
- Docking port: PMA-2 (Destiny forward)
- Docking date: 7 December 2001, 20:03 UTC
- Undocking date: 15 December 2001, 17:28 UTC
- Time docked: 7 days, 21 hours, 24 minutes
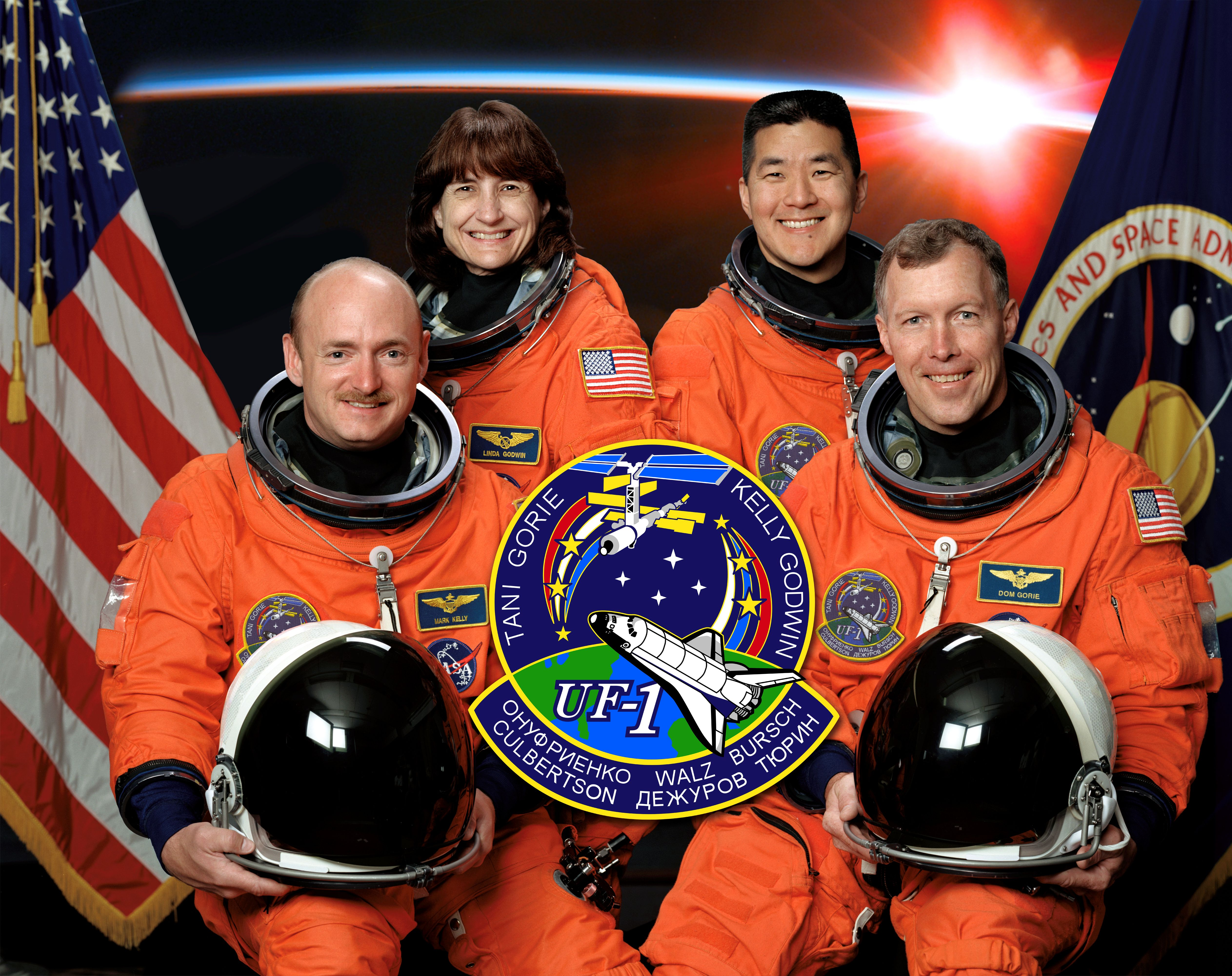
- (L-R): Mark E. Kelly, Linda M. Godwin, Daniel M. Tani, Dominic L. Pudwill Gorie Space Shuttle program

STS-108 was a Space Shuttle mission to the International Space Station (ISS) flown by Space Shuttle Endeavour. Its primary objective was to deliver supplies to and help maintain the ISS.

STS-108 was the 12th shuttle flight to visit the ISS and the first since the installation of the Russian airlock called Pirs on the station. Endeavour delivered the Expedition 4 crew to the orbital outpost. The Expedition 3 crew returned to Earth on Endeavour.

While at the station, the crew conducted one spacewalk and attached the Raffaello Multi-Purpose Logistics Module to the station so that about 2.7 metric tons (3 tons) of equipment and supplies could be unloaded. The crew later returned Raffaello to Endeavour's payload bay for the trip home.

== Crew ==
Position	Launching Astronaut	Landing Astronaut
Commander	(United States) Dominic L. Pudwill Gorie; Third spaceflight	
Pilot	(United States) Mark Kelly; First spaceflight	
Mission Specialist 1	(United States) Linda M. Godwin; Fourth and last spaceflight	
Mission Specialist 2 Flight Engineer	(United States) Daniel M. Tani; First spaceflight	
Mission Specialist 3	(Russia) Yury I. Onufriyenko, RKA; Expedition 4 Second and last spaceflight ISS Commander/Soyuz Commander	(United States) Frank L. Culbertson, Jr. Expedition 3 Third and last spaceflight ISS Commander
Mission Specialist 4	(United States) Carl E. Walz; Expedition 4 Fourth and last spaceflight ISS Flight Engineer	(Russia) Mikhail Tyurin, RKA; Expedition 3 First spaceflight ISS Flight Engineer
Mission Specialist 5	(United States) Daniel W. Bursch; Expedition 4 Fourth and last spaceflight ISS Flight Engineer	(Russia) Vladimir Dezhurov, RKA; Expedition 3 Second and last spaceflight ISS Flight Engineer

== Cargo ==
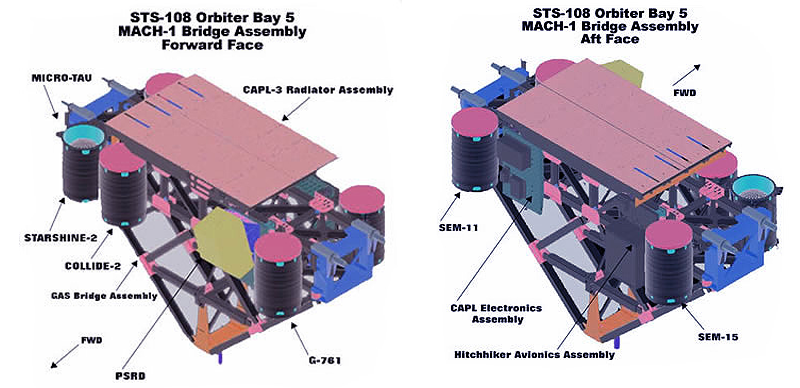
MACH-1 Carrier

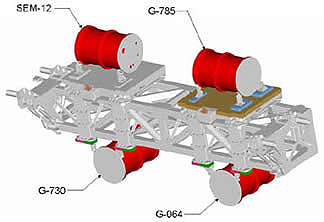
LMC with 3x GAS and SEM STS-108

SSAF-UF-1 carried the Multi Purpose Logistics Module (MPLM-2) 'Raffaello' (2nd flight) 4th MPLM flight overall. Also the Multiple Application Customized Hitchhiker (MACH-1) MPESS Hitchhiker experiment bridge: with CAPL-3, Starshine-2, SEM-11 & 15, G-0761, Prototype Synchrotron Radiation Detector (PSRD) & COLLIDE-2. As well as the Lightweight MPESS Carrier #2 (LMC) carrying: SEM-12, G-0785, G-0064 and G-0730.

== Launch highlights ==
Attempt	Planned	Result	Turnaround	Reason	Decision point	Weather go (%)	Notes
1	29 Nov 2001, 7:41:01 pm	Scrubbed	—	Technical	29 Nov 2001, 10:15 am	70	Docking problem with Progress spacecraft.
2	4 Dec 2001, 5:45:08 pm	Scrubbed	4 days 22 hours 4 minutes	Weather	4 Dec 2001, 5:45 pm (T−00:05:00)	80	Low clouds and light rain at launch pad.
3	5 Dec 2001, 5:19:28 pm	Success	0 days 23 hours 34 minutes			70	Cloud decks were approaching KSC and crosswinds were at the shuttle landing facility, but the conditions remained acceptable for launch.

The launch of Endeavour on 29 November 2001 was rescheduled for 4 December 2001 to allow sufficient time for the Expedition Three crew on the space station to successfully complete a spacewalk to clear an obstruction on the latching mechanism on the Russian Progress supply vehicle.

The launch 4 December was postponed due to unsatisfactory weather conditions in the KSC area. Launch controllers counted down to the T−5-minute point and held until the remainder of the window expired. The scrub had to be called after Astronaut Office Chief Charles Precourt, flying the Shuttle Training Aircraft, detected precipitation in a cloud mass that moved into the Complex 39 area shortly before launch.

Endeavour lifted off 5 December 2001 at 17:19 EST on the final Space Shuttle mission of 2001 to deliver three tons of supplies and a fresh crew to the International Space Station, and return home a crew that spent four months in space.

In addition to a new station crew and supplies, Endeavour carried a host of scientific investigations, including experiments from space agencies, schools and universities across the United States, Europe and South America, as well as a small satellite that involved more than 25,000 students in 26 countries.

=== Crew seat assignments ===
Seat	Launch	Landing	Seats 1–4 are on the flight deck. Seats 5–7 are on the mid-deck.
1	Gorie		Seats 1–4 are on the flight deck. Seats 5–7 are on the mid-deck.
2	Kelly		Seats 1–4 are on the flight deck. Seats 5–7 are on the mid-deck.
3	Godwin	Unused	Seats 1–4 are on the flight deck. Seats 5–7 are on the mid-deck.
4	Tani		Seats 1–4 are on the flight deck. Seats 5–7 are on the mid-deck.
5	Walz	Godwin	Seats 1–4 are on the flight deck. Seats 5–7 are on the mid-deck.
6	Onufriyenko	Culbertson	Seats 1–4 are on the flight deck. Seats 5–7 are on the mid-deck.
7	Bursch	Tyurin	Seats 1–4 are on the flight deck. Seats 5–7 are on the mid-deck.
8	Unused	Dezhurov	

== Mission highlights ==
The hatches were opened between Endeavour and the ISS Destiny Laboratory at 22:42 UTC 7 December 2001, enabling the ten crew members to greet one another. The Expedition 3 crew officially ended their 117-day residency on board the International Space Station 8 December as their custom Soyuz seat-liners were transferred to Endeavour for the return trip home. The transfer of the Expedition 4 seat-liners to the Soyuz return vehicle attached to the station marked the official exchange of crews.

Endeavour Pilot Mark Kelly and Mission Specialist Linda Godwin used the shuttle's robotic arm to lift the Raffaello Multi-Purpose Logistics Module from the shuttle payload bay and attach it to a berth on the station's Unity node. The crews began unloading supplies the same day.

=== EVA ===
EVA: 4 hours, 12 minutes – On 10 December 2001, Endeavour astronauts Linda Godwin and Daniel Tani completed a four-hour, 12-minute spacewalk to install insulation on mechanisms that rotate the International Space Station's main solar arrays. The two spacewalkers stopped at a stowage bin to retrieve a cover that had been removed from a station antenna during an earlier flight, and after its return to Earth, may be reused. Godwin and Tani also performed a "getahead;" task, positioning two switches on the station's exterior to be installed on a future shuttle mission, STS-110. The spacewalk completed a record year with 18 spacewalks conducted: 12 originating from the shuttle and six from the station.

=== Maintenance and re-supply ===
Mission managers extended Endeavour's flight to a duration of 12 days to allow Endeavour's crew to assist with additional maintenance tasks on the station, including work on a treadmill and replacing a failed compressor in one of the air conditioners in the Zvezda Service Module.

The astronauts and cosmonauts completed the transfer of more than 5,000 pounds of supplies and material from Endeavour's mid-deck and the Raffaello Multi-Purpose Logistics Module to the station. The transferred items included more than 850 pounds of food, 1,000 pounds of clothing and other crew provisions, 300 pounds of experiments and associated equipment, 800 pounds of spacewalking gear, and 600 pounds of medical equipment. In turn, the crew packed up the Raffaello module with items bound for a return trip to Earth.

=== IMU failure ===
On 12 December 2001, the crew and Mission Control noted a transient problem with one of the shuttle's three inertial measurement units (IMUs), the primary navigation units for the shuttle. Only two of the three IMUs were on line at the time, with the third unit off line to save electricity. The IMU that experienced a problem, designated IMU 2, was immediately taken off line and the third IMU brought on line. IMU 2 operated well after that, but it remained off line and was considered failed by flight controllers. The loss of one IMU had no impact on Endeavour's mission, and the other two units operated in excellent condition.

A formal change of command ceremony took place 13 December as Expedition 3 ended its residence and Expedition 4 began theirs.

=== Reboost and departure ===
Flight controllers planned slight changes to Endeavour's departure from the station 15 December 2001, allowing time for a small jet firing by the shuttle to boost the station's future path away from a piece of space debris that could pass near the complex. Mission Control was notified that a spent Russian rocket upper stage launched in the 1970s could pass within three miles of the station if Endeavour did not perform the engine firing. With the shuttle reboost, the station was predicted to pass more than 40 miles away from the debris.

Because the scheduled reboost used additional propellant, Endeavour did not perform a full-circle flyaround of the station after undocking. Instead, the shuttle undocked from the station, performing a quarter circle flyaround of the complex to a point about 400 feet directly above the station where it fired its engines in a final separation burn at 12:20 am EST, beginning its departure from the orbiting outpost.

=== Scientific experiments ===
Endeavour's middeck carried home the results of several experiments completed during Expedition 3's stay on the station. These included the Advanced Protein Crystallization Facility, the Dynamically Controlled Protein Crystal Growth experiment and cells from the Cellular Biotechnology Operations Support System (CBOSS).

The CBOSS equipment aboard the space station will remain active during Expedition 4, growing ovarian and colon cancer cells, as well as kidney cells in microgravity.

Experiments in Endeavour's payload bay were returned for investigators around the world. The Multiple Application Customized Hitchhiker-1 (MACH-1) carried a wide array of experiments, including the Prototype Synchrotron Radiation Detector, the Collisions into Dust Experiment-2, the Capillary Pump Loop, and the Space Experiment Module (SEM). The SEM carried experiments from Argentina, Portugal, Morocco and Australia, as well as experiments from U.S. schoolchildren. Several other canisters in Endeavour's payload bay also carried student experiments.

On its return to Earth, Endeavour's crew deployed a small satellite called STARSHINE 2 from a canister located in the payload bay. More than 30,000 students from 660 schools in 26 countries will be tracking STARSHINE 2 as it orbits the Earth for eight months. The students, who helped polish STARSHINE's 845 mirrors, will use the information they collect to calculate the density of the Earth's upper atmosphere.

== Honoring victims of the September 11 attacks ==
STS-108 was the first Space Shuttle mission following the September 11 attacks, and remembering it would become a focus of the flight. Security was increased at Kennedy Space Center for press and visitors for the launch, and press activity was more tightly controlled.

In the early morning hours of 12 September 2001, New York City Police Sergeant Gerald Kane and Detective Peter Friscia, assigned to the office of Police Commissioner Bernard B. Kerik, retrieved a large American flag that was tattered and torn and wrapped around a flag pole near in corners of Church and Chambers Street amidst the devastation of the World Trade Center site. That American flag, a USMC flag recovered from the Pentagon, an American flag that flew over the State Capital in Harrisburg, PA on the day of 11 September, the 23 shields (badges) of the fallen NYPD officers; patches, posters and an emblem from the FDNY, patches from the Port Authority of New York and New Jersey and 6,000 small American flags to honor those lost and those that served in the response and recovery efforts for 9/11 were all flown aboard Endeavour.

The 6,000 smaller flags were later given to families that lost loved ones on 9/11 and the flag retrieved from the World Trade Center site is maintained by the Office of the New York City Commissioner of Records.

== Spacewalks ==
- Godwin and Tani – EVA 1
- EVA 1 start: 10 December 2001 – 17:52 UTC
- EVA 1 end: 10 December 2001 – 22:04 UTC
- Duration: 4 hours, 12 minutes

== Images ==
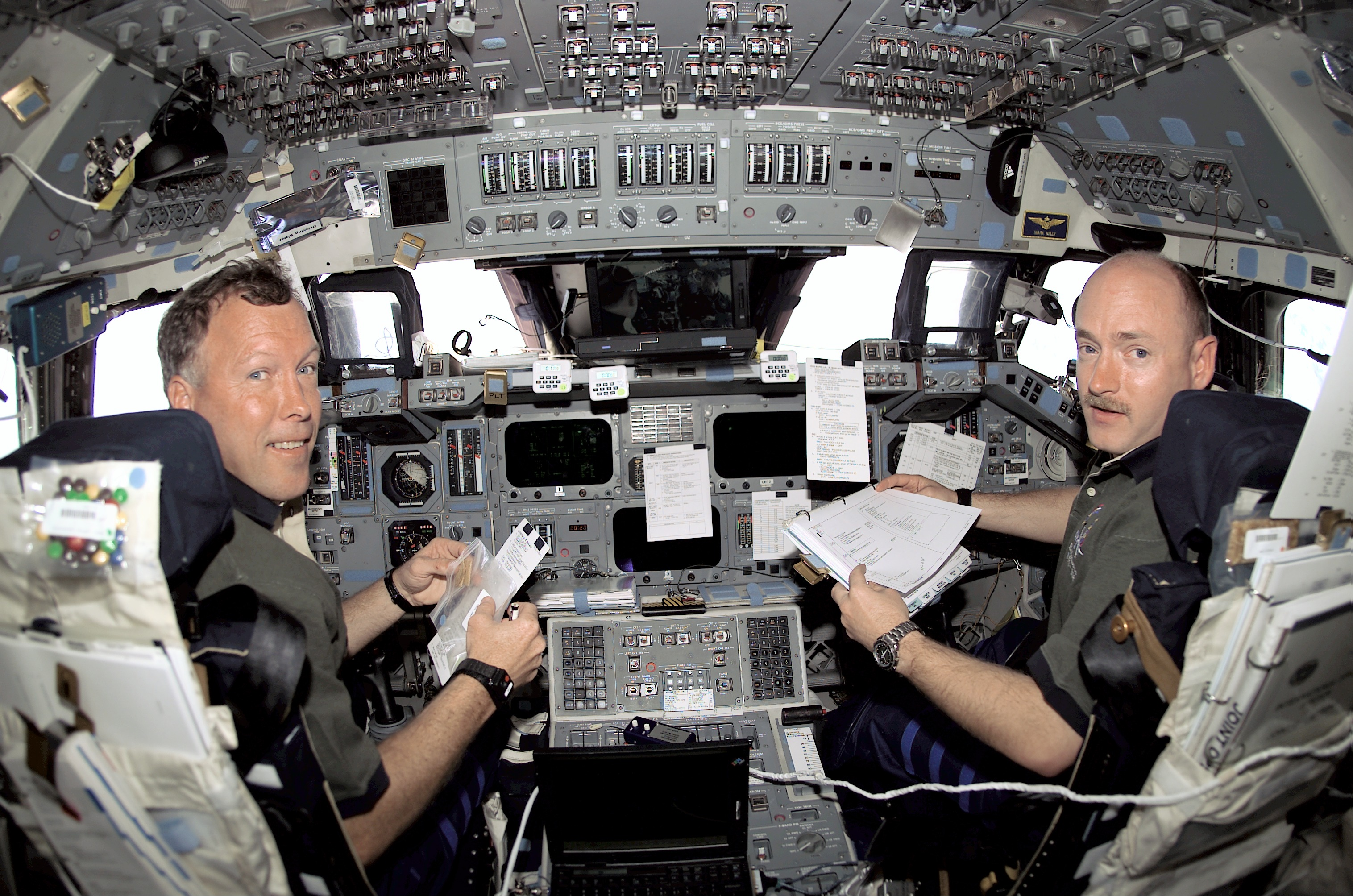
Dominic Pudwill Gorie, STS-108 commander, and pilot Mark Kelly are in their respective stations during rendezvous operations with the ISS. Pudwill Gorie brought Endeavour to a gentle linkup with the ISS as the two craft sailed over England.

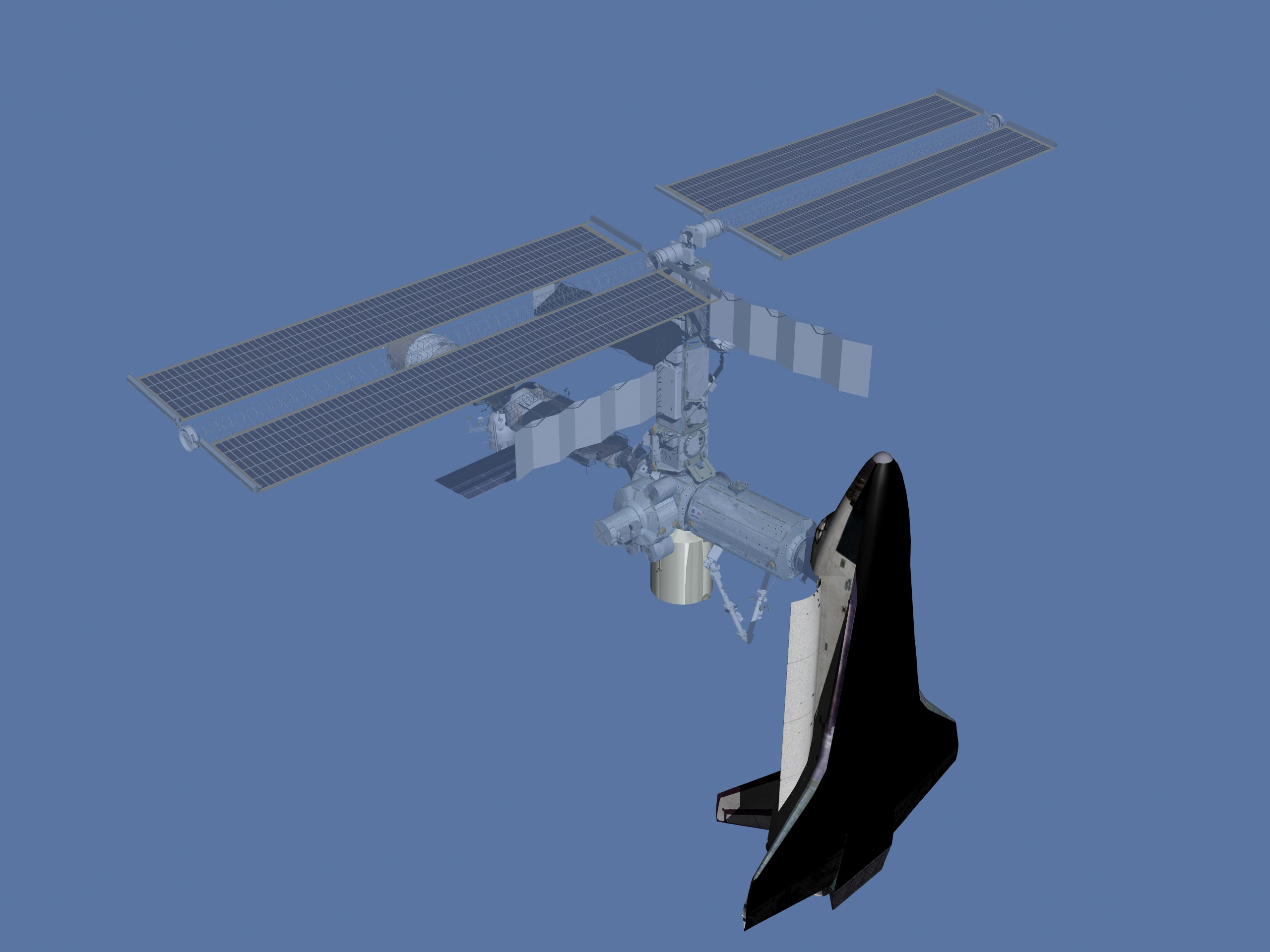
Illustration of the International Space Station during STS-108

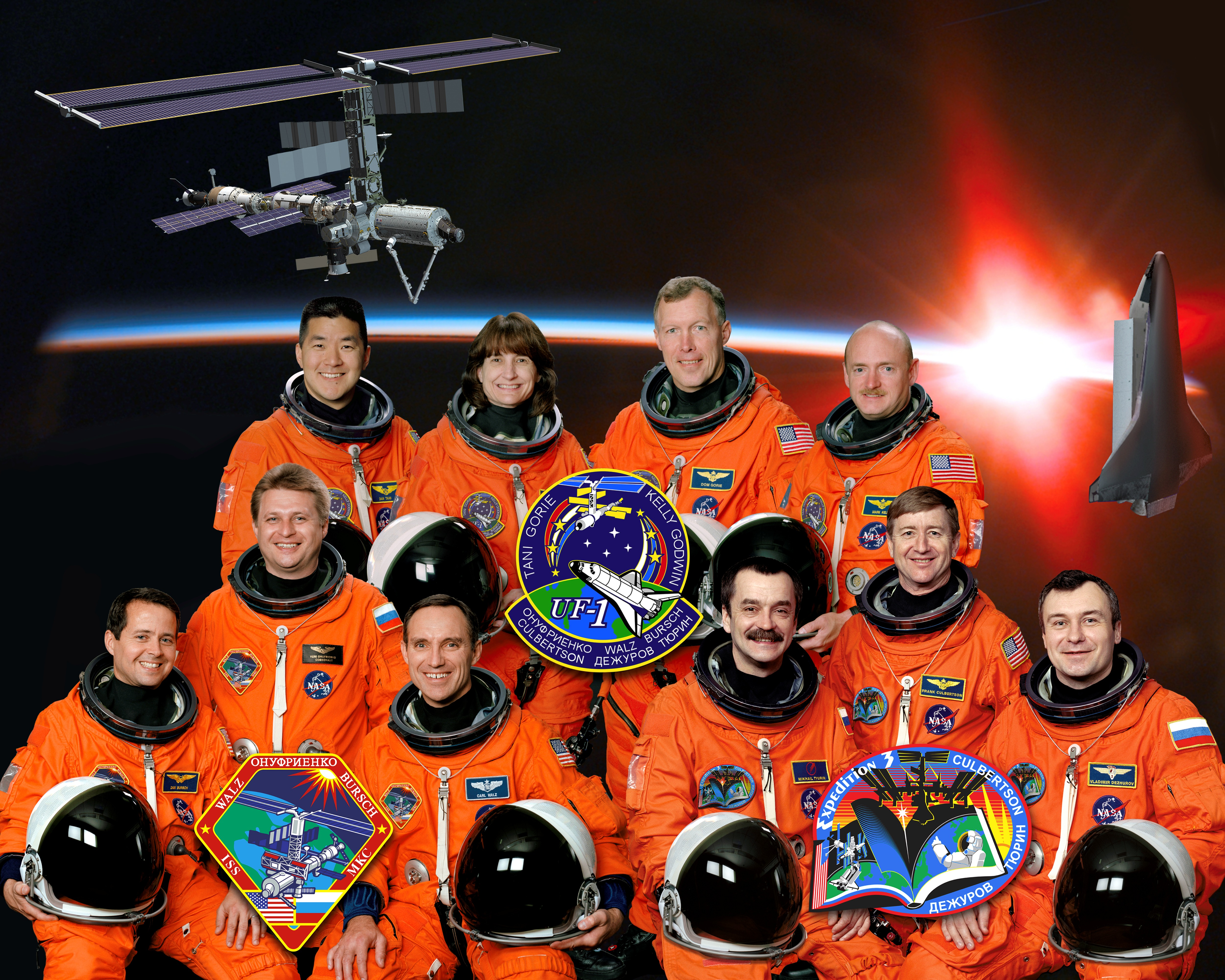
STS-108 crew with ISS Expedition 3 and 4 crews

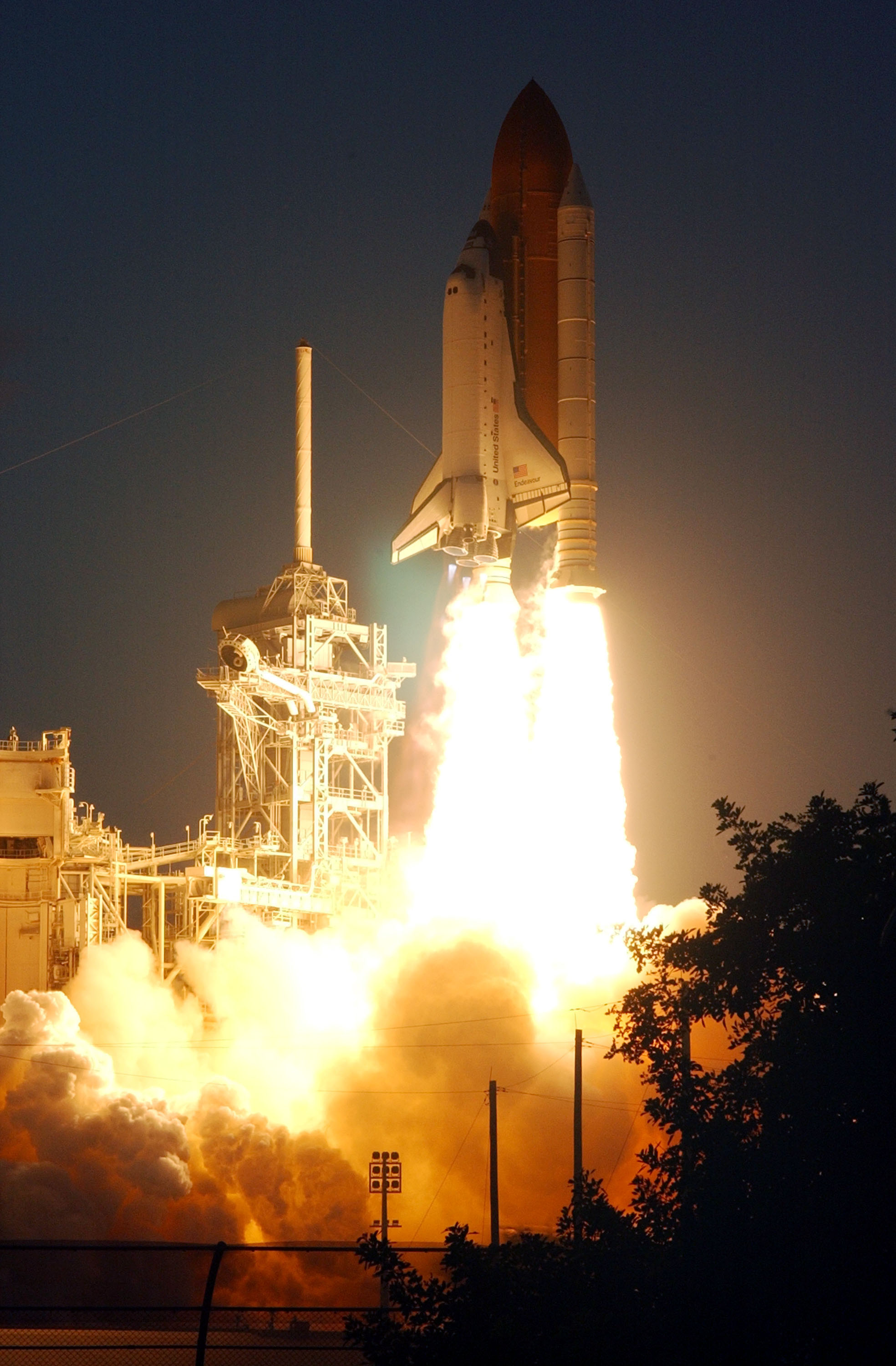
The launch of Endeavour on 5 December 2001

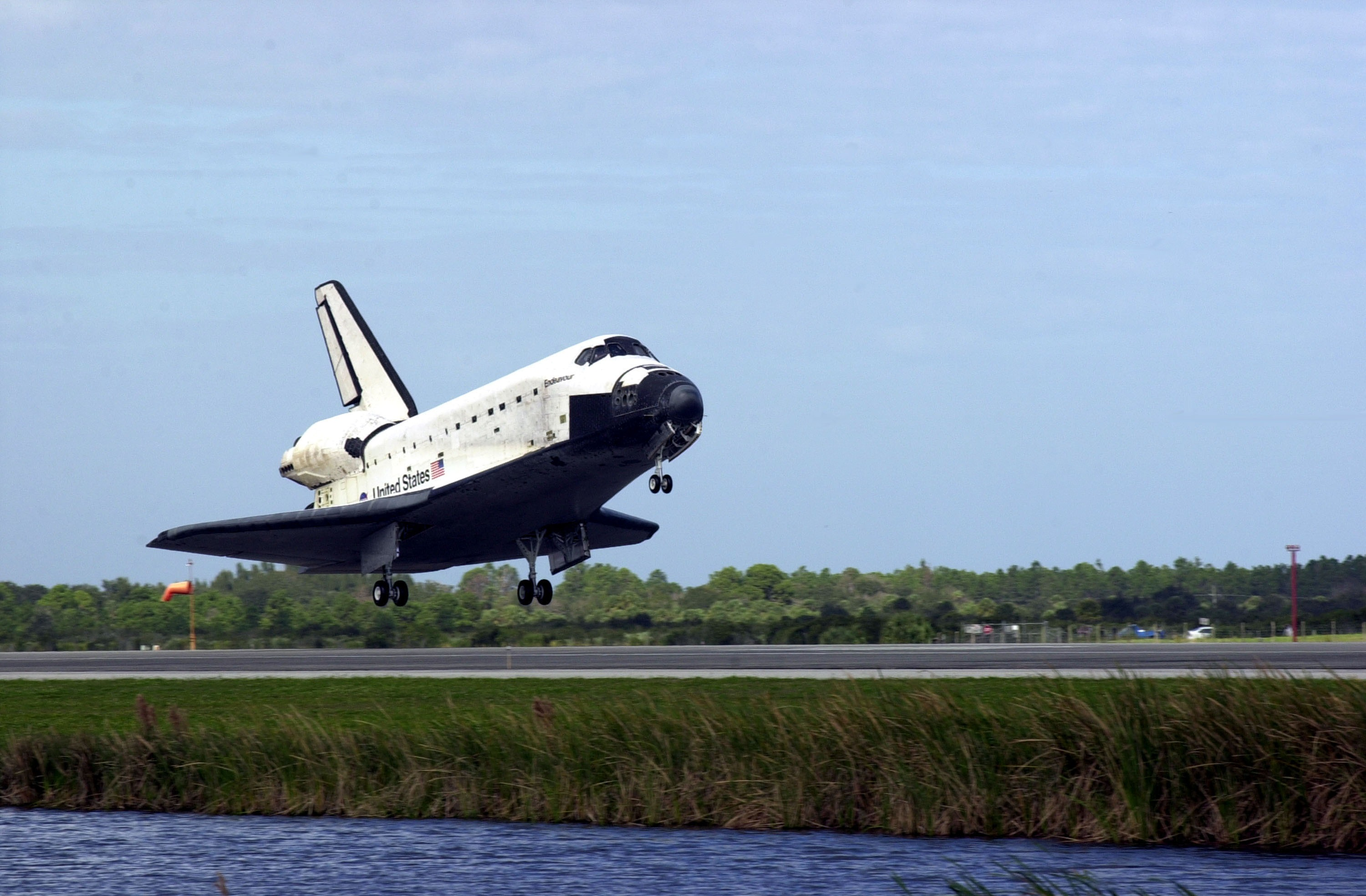
STS-108 lands at the Shuttle Landing Facility at Kennedy Space Center.

== See also ==
- List of human spaceflights
- List of International Space Station spacewalks
- List of Space Shuttle missions
- List of spacewalks and moonwalks 1965–1999
- Outline of space science
