= Yury Onufriyenko =

Russian cosmonaut (born 1961)

Yuri Onufrienko
- Юрий Онуфриенко; Юрій Онуфрієнко
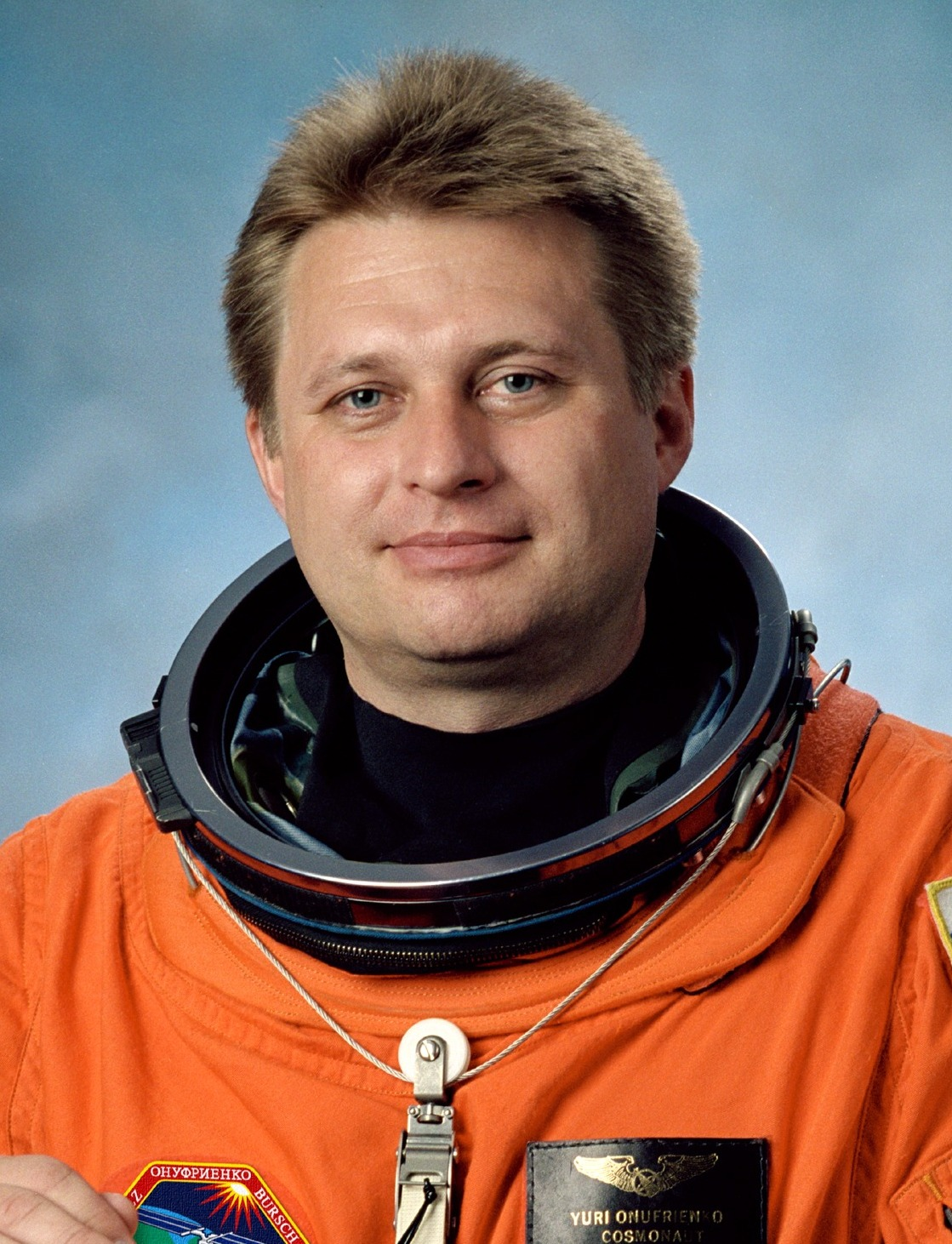
- Onufrienko in 2002
- Born: February 6, 1961 (age 65); Ryasne, Ukraine, Soviet Union
- Occupation: Pilot
- Awards: Hero of the Russian Federation
- Space career

Roscosmos cosmonaut
- Status: Retired
- Rank: Colonel
- Time in space: 389d 14h 46min
- Selection: 1989 TsPK Cosmonaut Group
- Total EVAs: 8
- Total EVA time: 42 hours, 33 minutes
- Missions: Soyuz TM-23 (Mir EO-21), Expedition 4 (STS-108/STS-111)

Col. Yuri Ivanovich Onufrienko (Russian: Юрий Иванович Онуфриенко, Ukrainian: Юрій Іванович Онуфрієнко; born 6 February 1961) is a retired Russian cosmonaut. He is a veteran of two extended spaceflights, aboard the space station Mir in 1996 and aboard the International Space Station in 2001–2002.

== Personal ==
Onufrienko was born in Ryasne, Zolochiv Raion of Kharkiv Oblast, Soviet Union (now Ukraine). Onufrienko and his wife, Valentina Mikhailovna Onufrienko, have two sons, Yuri, born in 1982 and Aleksandr, born in 1990 and one daughter, Elena, born in 1988. He has two older brothers and his parents are deceased. Onufrienko enjoys tennis, cooking, fishing, chess, and aviation.

== Education ==
Onufrienko graduated from the V.M. Komarov Eisk Higher Military Aviation School for Pilots in 1982 with a pilot-engineer's diploma. In 1994, Onufrienko earned a degree in cartography from Moscow State University.

== Awards ==
Onufrienko was awarded the Hero of Russia medal, the title of Pilot-Cosmonaut of the Russian Federation, the Gold Star Medal of the Hero of the Russian Federation and NASA Space Flight and Public Service Medals. In 1997 he was named a Chevalier in the French Legion of Honor.

== Experience ==
Onufrienko served as a pilot in the Soviet (later Russian) Air Force, where he logged over 800 flight hours. He has flown the L-29, Sukhoi Su-7, Sukhoi Su-17 (M1-4), and L-39.

== Cosmonaut career ==
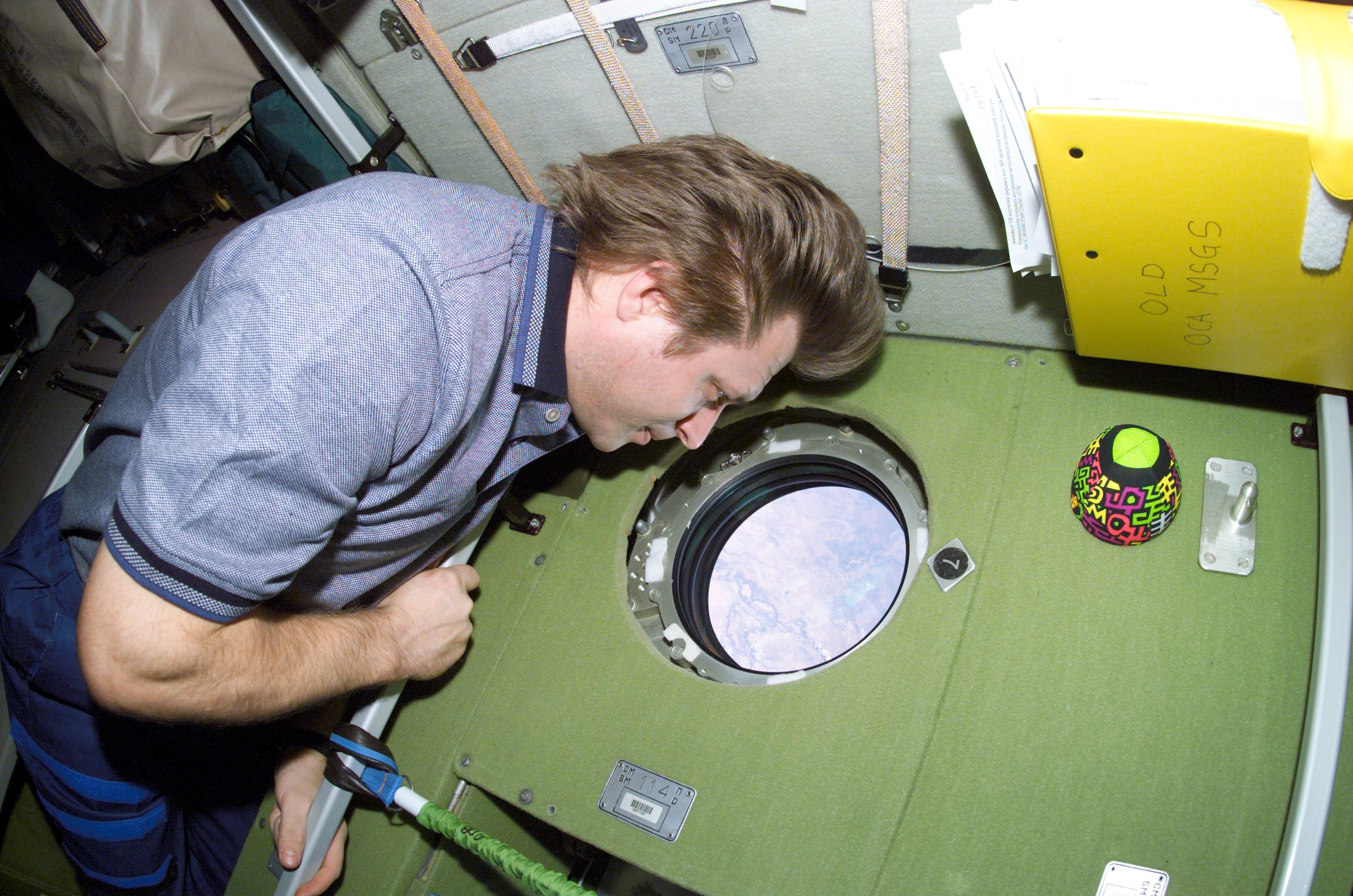
Onufrienko, Expedition 4 commander looks out a window in the Zvezda Module on the ISS.

Onufrienko was selected as a cosmonaut candidate in 1989. From September 1989 to January 1991, he underwent a course of general space training. Starting April 1991, he underwent training as a member of test cosmonauts group. Starting March 1994, he entered flight training to be the commander of the stand-by crew of the Mir-18 expedition aboard the Soyuz TM-21 spacecraft and the Mir space station as part of the Shuttle-Mir program.

=== Mir EO-21 ===
From February 21 to September 2, 1996, Onufrienko served as commander of the Mir EO-21 expedition. The Soyuz TM-23 spacecraft carrying Onufrienko with cosmonaut Yury Usachov lifted off from the Baikonur Cosmodrome on February 21, 1996, at 12:34:05 UTC. After two days of autonomous flight, the Soyuz spacecraft docked with the Mir space station's forward-facing port on February 23 at 14:20 UTC. One month later, he and Yuri Usachov were joined by NASA astronaut Shannon Lucid. During Mir-21 Onufrienko performed numerous research experiments including Protein crystal growth experiments experiments in materials science using high temperature melting oven "Optizon". The new module Priroda, the seventh and final module of the Mir Space Station arrived on April 26, 1996. Its primary purpose was to conduct Earth resource experiments through remote sensing and to develop and verify remote sensing methods. During Mir EO-21 supplies arrived with the Progress M-31 spacecraft. Onufrienko and Yuri Usachov were joined by French astronaut Claudie André-Deshays after the departure of Shannon Lucid.

On September 2, 1996, Onufrienko, Usachev and Claudie André-Deshays returned to Earth on board the Soyuz TM-23 capsule. The spacecraft landed at 07:41:40 UTC 108 km south west of Akmola (Tselinograd). Altogether, on board Soyuz TM-23 and Mir, Onufrienko logged 193 days in space.

=== Expedition 4 ===
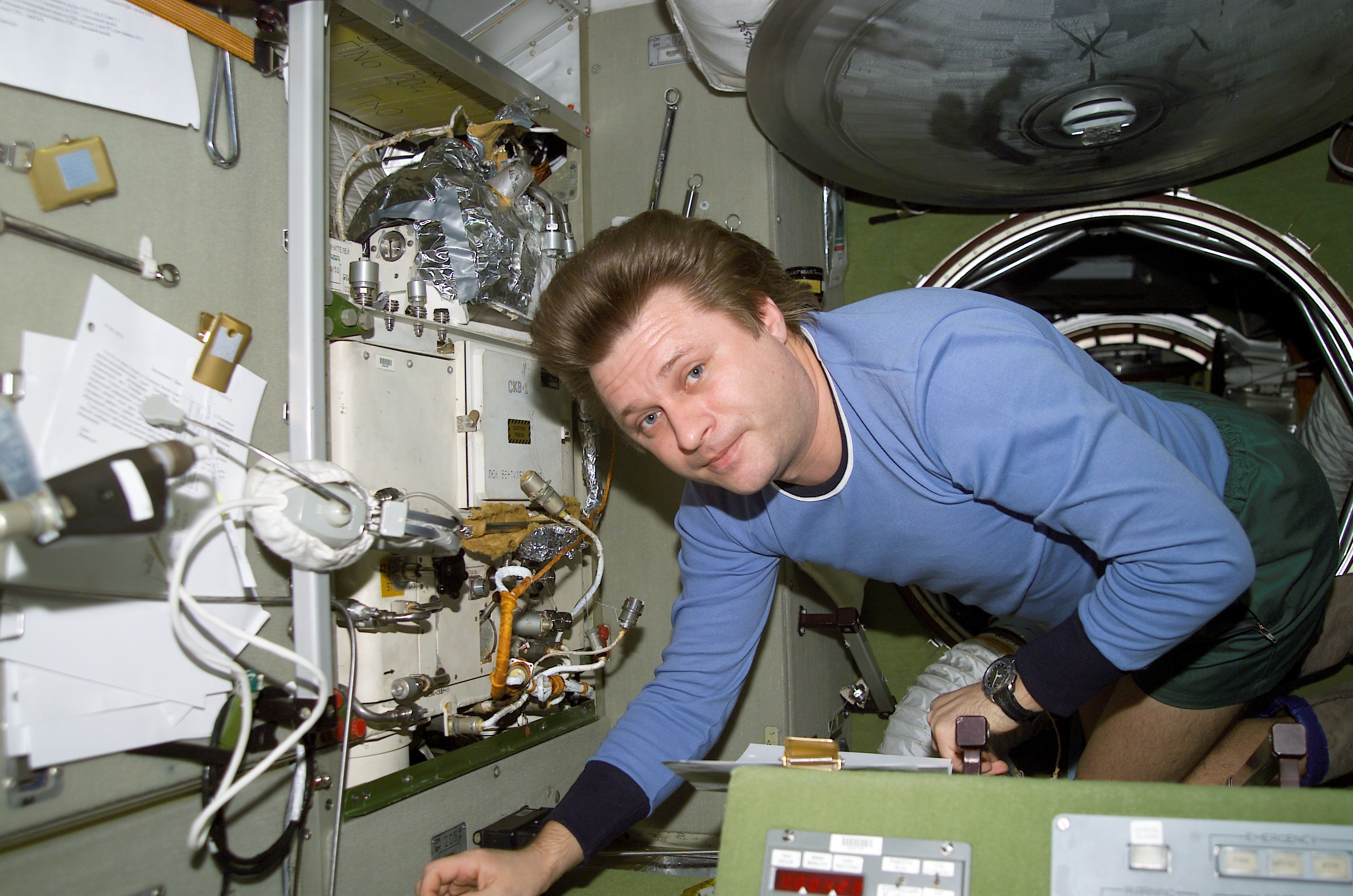
Yury Onufrienko works in the Zvezda module on the ISS.

Onufrienko again served as commander on ISS Expedition 4. Onufrienko returned to space on board Space Shuttle Endeavour's STS-108 mission. Launched on December 5, 2001, at 22:19:28 UTC from the Kennedy Space Center, Endeavour docked with the International Space Station (ISS) on December 7, 2001, at 20:03 UTC. The primary objective of STS-108 was to deliver supplies to and help maintain the ISS. During a 6 1/2-month stay aboard the ISS, the 3 member Expedition 4 crew (Onufrienko and NASA astronauts Daniel W. Bursch and Carl E. Walz) performed flight tests of the station hardware, conducted internal and external maintenance tasks, and developed the capability of the station to support the addition of science experiments. The Expedition 4 crew returned to Earth aboard STS-111, with Endeavour landing at Edwards Air Force Base, California, on June 19, 2002. In completing this mission, Onufrienko logged an additional 196 days in space, for a total of 389 days of spaceflight.

=== Spacewalks ===
Onufrienko has performed eight career spacewalks totaling 42 hours and 33 minutes. As of June 2010, he has secured the 11th position in the list of astronauts who have the most spacewalk time. Onufrienko performed six spacewalks during his stay on board the Mir Space Station and performed another two during his visit to the ISS.

Onufrienko performed his first career spacewalk on 15 March 1996. He and cosmonaut Usachov started the spacewalk at 01:04 UTC. They installed the second Strela boom and prepared for Mir Cooperative Solar Array (MCSA) installation. The spacewalk lasted 5 hours and 51 minutes.

On 20 May 1996 Onufrienko performed his second career spacewalk. The spacewalk started at 22:50 UTC and ended at 04:10 UTC clocking 5 hours and 20 minutes. During the spacewalk, the two cosmonauts removed the Mir cooperative solar array (MCSA) from its stowed position on the exterior of the docking module at the base of the Kristall module. They used the Strela boom to reach and move the array to the Kvant-1 module. The two spacewalkers also inflated an aluminum and nylon pup-up model of a Pepsi Cola can, which they then filmed against the backdrop of Earth. The Pepsi Cola company paid for the procedure and planned to use the film in a television commercial. However, the commercial never aired—reportedly because Pepsi later changed the design of the can.

Onufrienko performed his third career spacewalk on 24 May 1996. He and cosmonaut Usachov started the spacewalk at 22:50 UTC. They installed the MCSA on the Kvant-1 module. The spacewalk lasted 5 hours and 34 minutes.

On 30 May 1996, Onufrienko ventured outside the Mir Space Station to conduct his fourth career spacewalk. He and cosmonaut Usachov started the spacewalk at 18:20 UTC. They installed the modular optoelectrical multispectral scanner (MOMS) outside Priroda and handrails on the Kvant-2 module to facilitate moving around outside the station during future extravehicular activities. MOMS was used to study the Earth's atmosphere and environment. The spacewalk lasted 4 hours and 20 minutes.

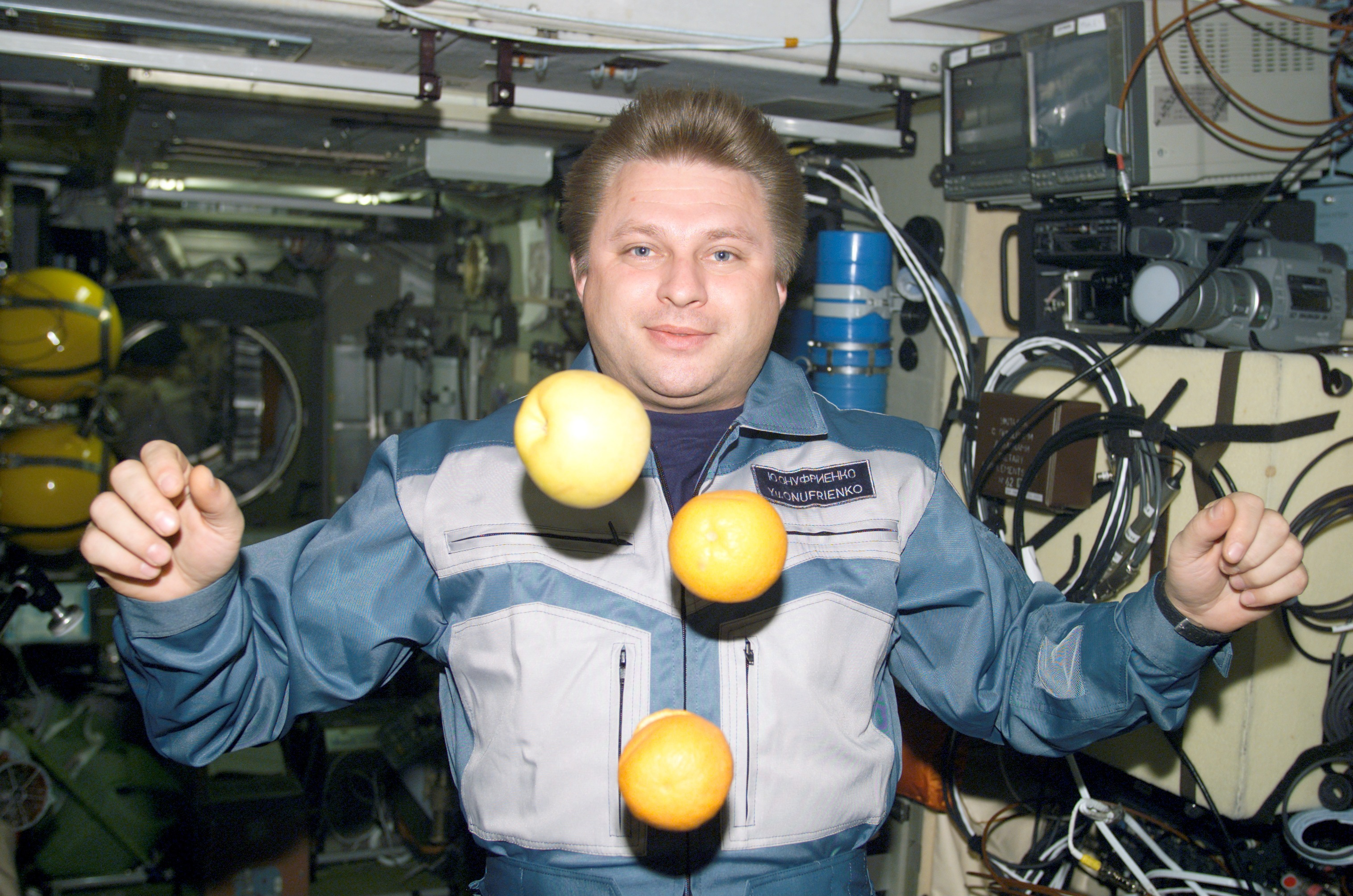
Onufrienko is photographed in the Zvezda Module with Apples and oranges floating freely in front of him.

On 6 June 1996, Onufrienko performed his fifth career spacewalk. He and Usachov installed micrometeoroid detectors and replaced cassettes in the Swiss/Russian Komza experiment and installed the Particle Impact Experiment, the Mir Sample Return Experiment, and the SKK-11 cassette, which exposed construction materials to space conditions. The spacewalk lasted 3 hours and 34 minutes.

Onufrienko performed his sixth career spacewalk on 13 June 1996. The spacewalk started at 12:45 UTC and ended at 18:27 UTC clocking 5 hours and 42 minutes. During the spacewalk, Onufrienko and Usachov installed the Rapana truss structure (an experiment mounting point) to the Kvant-1 module. Onufrienko and Usachev also manually deployed the saddle-shaped traverse synthetic aperture radar antenna on Priroda. The large antenna had failed to open fully after receiving commands from inside Mir.

Onufrienko performed his seventh career spacewalk on January 14, 2002. The space walk was based out of the Pirs Airlock and used Russian Orlan space suits. Onufrienko and NASA astronaut Carl Walz relocated the cargo boom for the Russian Strela crane. They moved the boom from Pressurized Mating Adapter (PMA 1) to the exterior of the Pirs Docking Compartment. The crew also installed an amateur radio antenna onto the end of the Zvezda Service Module. The spacewalk lasted 6 hours and 3 minutes.

Onufrienko performed his eighth career spacewalk on January 25, 2002, when he and NASA astronaut Daniel Bursch ventured out into space from the Pirs airlock. During the spacewalk, Onufrienko and Bursch installed six deflector shields for the Zvezda Service Module's jet thrusters. Also, they installed an amateur radio antenna. The two spacewalkers also removed an experiment called Kromka situated near one of the thruster groups and installed a virtually identical new Kromka experiment in the same place. The experiment captured material that results from thruster firings. Onufrienko and Bursch also attached a physics experiment called Platan to the Zvezda module. Platan was designed to capture low-energy heavy nuclei from the Sun and from outside the Solar System. In addition, they installed three materials experiments, called SKK for their Russian acronym, on the Zvezda module. The experiments examine effects of the harsh environment of space on a wide range of materials. The spacewalk lasted 5 hours and 59 minutes.

== See also ==
- List of Heroes of the Russian Federation
