= Philippe Perrin =

French test pilot, astronaut and engineer (born 1963)

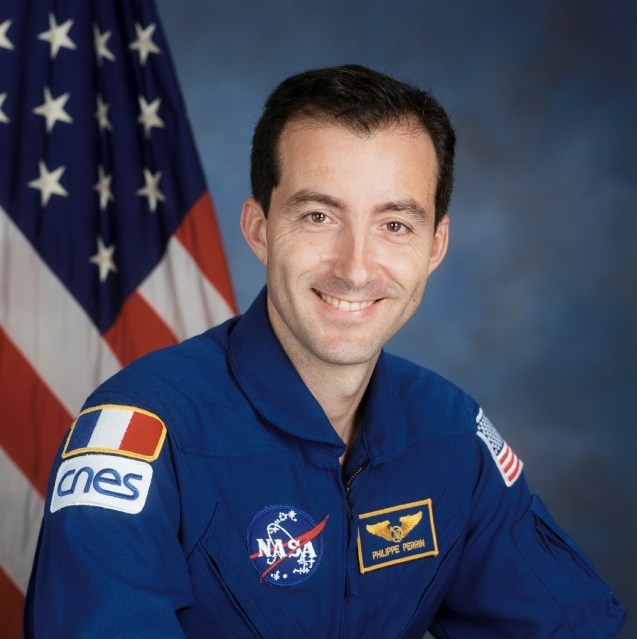
- Born: 6 January 1963 (age 63); Meknes, Morocco
- Occupation: Pilot
- Space career

CNES/ESA astronaut
- Status: Retired
- Rank: Colonel, French Air Force
- Time in space: 13d 20h 35m
- Selection: 1990 CNES Group 3, NASA Group 16 (1996), 1999 ESA Group
- Total EVAs: 3
- Total EVA time: 19h, 31m
- Missions: STS-111
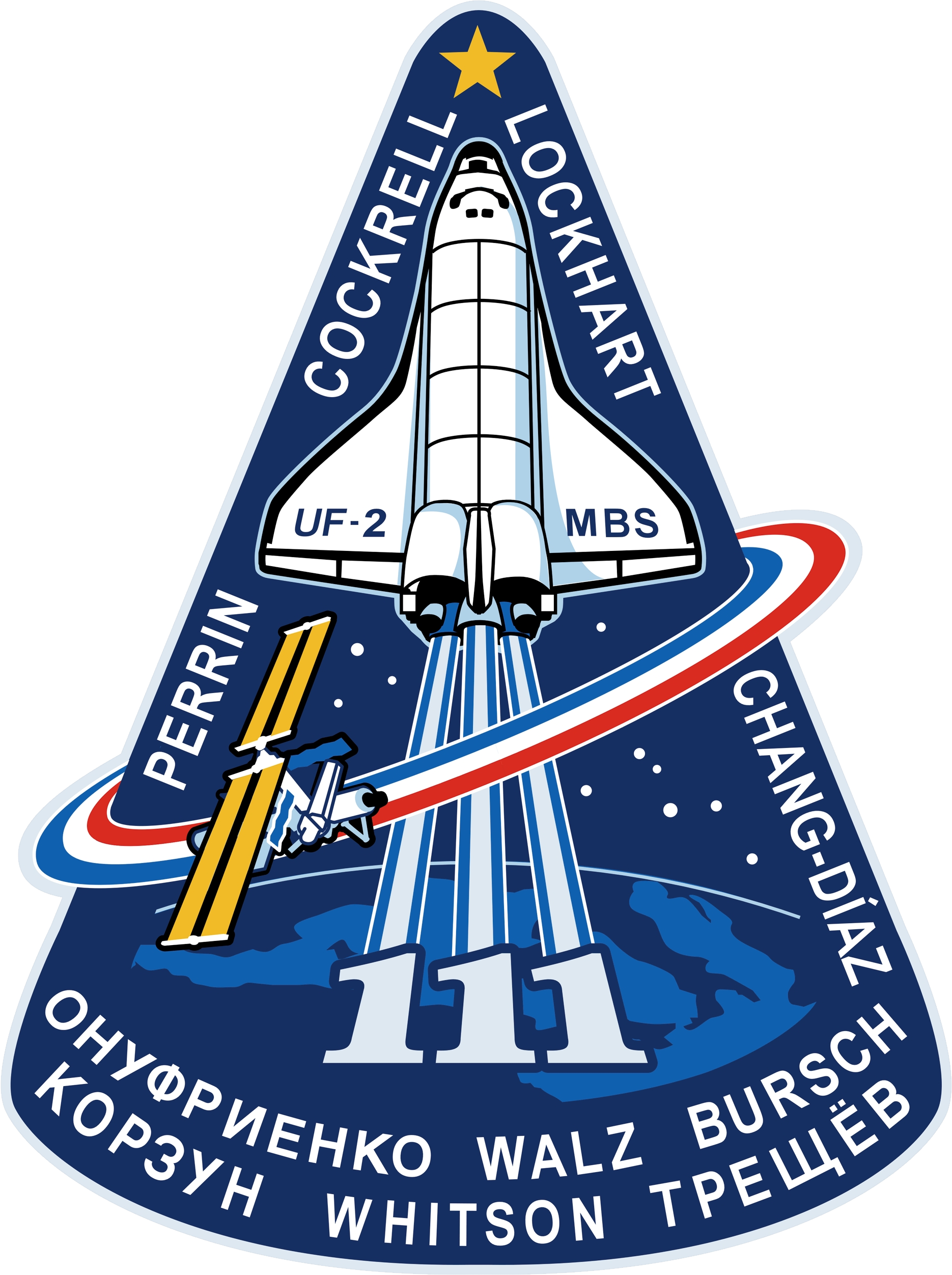
- Mission insignia

Philippe Perrin (Colonel, French Air Force) (born January 6, 1963) is a French test pilot, engineer and former CNES and European Space Agency astronaut. He served as mission specialist on the STS-111 mission where he conducted three spacewalks attaching new hardware to the International Space Station and replacing a wrist joint on the Canadarm2.

== Background ==
Perrin was born 6 January 1963, in Meknes, Morocco, but considers Avignon, Provence, to be his hometown. He entered the École polytechnique in 1982 and graduated in 1985. Perrin then received his Test Pilot Licence in 1993 from the École du personnel navigant d'essais et de réception (EPNER), the French Test Pilot School at Istres Air Force Base and received his Air Line Pilot Certificate in 1995.

== Military and flight career ==
Prior to graduating from the École polytechnique, Perrin completed military duty in the French Navy, where he was trained in ship piloting and navigation, and spent six months at sea in the Indian Ocean. Following École polytechnique, he entered the French Air Force in 1985, was awarded his pilot's wings in 1986, and was assigned to the 33rd Reconnaissance Wing at Strasbourg Air Force Base (1987–1991). He flew the Mirage F1CR and made detachments in Africa and Saudi Arabia.

Perrin has flown 26 combat missions and has logged over 2,500 flying hours in over 30 types (from jet fighters to Airbus).

Upon graduating from EPNER, the French Test Pilot School, he worked on a variety of test programs while assigned to the Bretigny Test Center. In 1992, he was temporarily detached to the French Space Agency (CNES) and sent to Star City, Russia, where he trained for two months. In 1993, he reported to the 2nd Air Defense Wing of Dijon Air Force Base as Senior Operations Officer (Operation Southern Watch). In 1995, he returned to the Bretigny Test Center, as Chief Pilot Deputy, in charge of the development of the Mirage 2000-5.

== CNES and ESA career ==
In July 1996, CNES announced his selection as an astronaut candidate and assigned him to attend NASA's Astronaut Candidate Training in Houston, Texas.

Perrin reported to the Johnson Space Center in August 1996. Having completed two years of training and evaluation, he qualified for flight assignments as a mission specialist. Perrin was initially assigned technical duties in the Astronaut Office Spacecraft Systems/Operations Branch.

He served as a mission specialist on the STS-111 mission in 2002 and logged over 332 hours in space, including 19 hours and 31 minutes in three spacewalks, performed with Franklin Chang-Diaz.

After his flight, Perrin returned to France to work as support astronaut on the Automated Transfer Vehicle program. December 2002 he was transferred from CNES to the European Space Agency's astronaut corps.

He did not fly in space with ESA and left the European Astronaut Corps in 2004. He is currently working as a test pilot for Airbus.

=== Spaceflight experience ===
STS-111 Endeavour (5–19 June 2002). The STS-111 mission delivered a new ISS resident crew and a Canadian-built mobile base for the ISS robotic arm. The crew repaired the ISS robot arm by replacing one of the arm's joints. It was the second Space Shuttle mission dedicated to delivering research equipment to ISS. Perrin did three EVAs (spacewalks) with Franklin Chang-Diaz. STS-111 also brought home the Expedition 4 crew from their 6 1/2-month stay aboard the station. Mission duration was 13 days, 20 hours and 35 minutes. Unacceptable weather conditions in Florida forced a landing at Edwards Air Force Base, California.

== Awards and honors ==
- Awarded his pilot’s wings "first of his class" in 1996
- French Air Force Award for Flight Safety (2) in 1989
- French Overseas Medal (Gulf War, 1991)
- French National Defense Medal (2)
- Officier, Légion d'Honneur

Perrin is the only French astronaut to have received the Légion d'Honneur before flying in space as he became chevalier due to his actions while he was a military pilot. He was then elevated to the officier class after his space mission.
