= Odyssey 2050 =

- Directed by: Daniel Bermejo
- Story by: Bruce Callow; Synchro Films; Young people across the world
- Starring: Jair Cruz; Carlos Lewis; Hanzell Carballo; Bruce Callow; Douglas Williamson; Sharon Campbell; Gabriel Facchini
- Cinematography: Harris Montero; Miguel Bermejo; Daniel Bermejo
- Edited by: Synchro Films
- Music by: Harris Montero; Bruce Callow
- Release date: 2012
- Running time: Short Film in Spanish and English: 12 minutes Longer Spanish version: 47 minutes Feature Film: tbc
- Countries: Costa Rica; United Kingdom
- Languages: Spanish; English

Odyssey 2050 is a multimedia film project created by Canadian teacher and musician Bruce Callow. The film incorporates digital animation, documentary, and live action sequences. The aim of the film is to motivate young people from around the world to take constructive action against climate change. Odyssey 2050 is also a registered non-governmental organization. The film was produced in Costa Rica by Daniel and Miguel Bermejo of the Synchro Film company. Bruce Callow, formerly of the UK Embassy, the Earth Charter Initiative, and the British Council were also producers.

Odyssey 2050 blends animation and graphics with real life images of environmental destruction. The film aims to raise awareness, create positive change and to reach young people across the world.

Odyssey 2050 was established by the British Embassy in Costa Rica with financial support from Foreign and Commonwealth Office. Along with the production of the film, the team at Odyssey 2050 is engaged in running workshops at schools and universities, climate change conferences, and businesses worldwide.

== Plot ==
The year is 2050 and alien space travelers look down on Planet Earth and witness the terrible devastation that it has suffered from climate change and environmental destruction at the hands of its most dominant species — humans. In comprehension sweeps throughout the alien ship and into their alien thoughts, as they ask 'how can such an intelligent and creative species treat their own planet like this?' They return to the present day to warn young people about the society that awaits them if positive action is not taken. Time is running out—it's not too late.

== Objective ==
The objective of Odyssey 2050 is to educate and motivate a generation of environmentally conscious young people to put ideas into action. As explained by Dr. Franklin Chang Díaz during the film, "it's not your fault....but it's your responsibility, unfortunately. So you will have to take action, and you will have to lead the world into making some changes..... it will require a lot of firm action on your part."

Odyssey 2050 engages its young audience in a relevant way that makes it fun and motivating and encourages them to start thinking about sustainability and the biophysical environment. To achieve this, it combines computer-animated aliens, audience interaction, fun graphics and real-life footage of young environmental activists who are making a difference. It seeks to highlight the reality and multiple dimensions of climate change, such as droughts, failing crops, global warming, carbon emissions, melting polar ice caps and rising sea levels. And that protecting the environment is a shared responsibility, and human actions, whether it is a nation or a single person, can affect all animals and species that coexist on our planet.

== Promotion, Workshops, Conferences ==
=== The Odyssey 2050 Comic Book ===
The promotional Odyssey 2050 comic book was released in March 2012 in London and was sponsored by Artists' Project Earth, a UK registered charity. One of the objectives of Odyssey 2050 is to reach out to young people from across the world, and especially marginalized and vulnerable groups who often don't have access to electricity, computers and DVD players. The comic book enables young people in areas of limited technology and financial resources to be introduced to the project and have fun while they learn about climate change and the need to take action on it. The comic has been distributed across schools in remote and neglected parts of Latin America's poorest country, Nicaragua. The Odyssey 2050 association works in partnership with the Caribbean Coast Catholic Church coordinators that run schools for 17,000 young Nicaraguans and ensure that the comics are used well by the schools and complement existing environmental education programmes.

Following in the success of the Odyssey 2050 Comic Book, a short photo and information book highlighting Odyssey's global work was produced.

=== Interactive Audience ===
A unique feature of Odyssey 2050 is that it is interactive. Young people from across the world have been invited to submit videos, illustrations, graphics, and written ideas to Odyssey 2050 to express how they think the script should develop or to highlight the actions they are taking in their communities to tackle climate change and protect the environment. Using these ideas and messages the script writers and technical team for Odyssey 2050 are developing and creating the story.

=== Education ===
A key to Odyssey 2050's success is the way it combines artistic, environmental and scientific elements. The short film serves as a climate change educational resource in a number of countries across the world.

Odyssey 2050 has been adopted by The British Council who have developed an online intermediate English lesson plan that incorporates the main messages of the film into its teaching.

=== United Nations Climate Change Conferences ===
Odyssey 2050 milestones include energetic interventions at COP 16 and COP 17. In December 2010, Odyssey 2050 participated in COP 16 in Cancún, Mexico. The short-film was screened to Cancún high school students at the COP 16 Climate Change Village. Award winning Odyssey 2050 graphic artwork from Poland, New Zealand, Armenia, South Korea and Sweden was featured at the event. In the lead up to this conference competitions were held in countries all over the world to have their works represented at the conference alongside Odyssey 2050 and the prize winners from Mexico and Central America were in attendance and exchanged ideas about how to protect the environment.

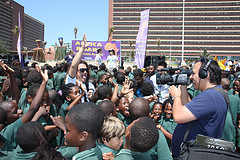
Whilst attending in DurbanCOP17 the Odyssey 2050 Association held workshops with children

In December 2011, whilst attending COP 17, Odyssey 2050 held workshops with primary, high school and university students in Durban and the film short was shown in the UNFCCC Digital Media Lounge to government negotiators, NGOs and journalists from across the world.

In 2012 Odyssey 2050 was represented at COP 18 in Qatar, and also the London Olympics.

=== TEDx Pura Vida Conferences ===
In 2011, British ambassador Tom Kennedy gave a presentation on Odyssey 2050 at the TEDx Pura Vida Conference in San José, Costa Rica generating interest throughout the Spanish speaking world. Later in the year, Ambassadors Sharon Campbell and Chris Campbell gave a sneak preview of the first module of Odyssey 2050 at the TEDx Jóven Pura Vida conference at the Nova Cinema. At these conferences, reaction to the film was positive, and has resulted in competitions being launched for the students who attended the conferences, the winners of which visited Synchro Studios.

=== Odyssey 2050 Time Capsule and Launch of Spanish version of the film ===
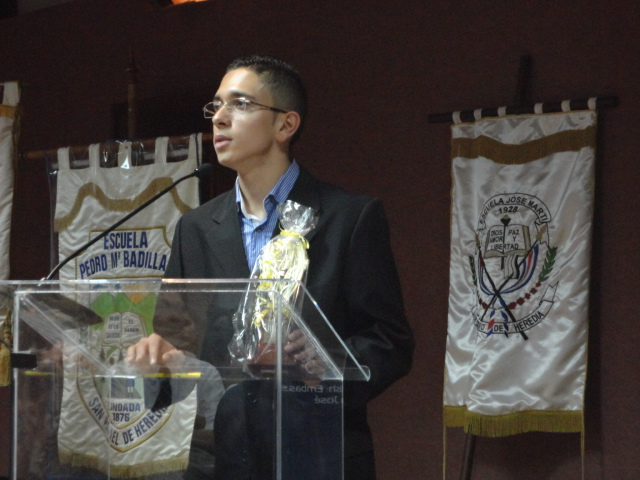
Juan Pablo Alfaro

On 26 September 2012 in the auditorium of the National Centre for Advanced Technology (CENAT) in San José, Costa Rica, the premiere of the 45 minute Spanish language version of Odyssey 2050 took place. 350 Costa Rican students attended the event and also participated in the launch of the Odyssey 2050 Time Capsule which is housed within the CENAT and will be opened in September 2050. Over 800 messages for the Time Capsule were collected from young people from countries around the world including South Africa, Canada, Spain and Nicaragua. At the event 18-year-old Juan Pablo Alfaro received a special award from Odyssey 2050 and the Costa Rican Ministry of Science for an invention he developed that filters toxic gases emitted from vehicles. Popular Costa Rican television personalities Yiyo and Choche (who also act in the film) helped host the event making it highly enjoyable for the young audience.

== Partners ==
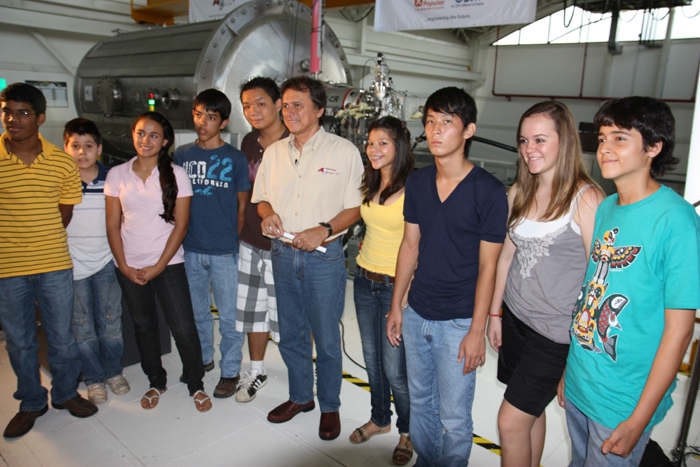
Dr. Chang with students during the filming at Ad Astra Rocket Company.

Odyssey 2050 has the support of Costa Rican scientist/engineer NASA astronaut Dr. Franklin Chang, who joined the Odyssey 2050 team in May 2010 and currently appears in the film short.

In November 2011, FCO Minister Jeremy Browne attended an Odyssey 2050 event where he presented awards to Odyssey 2050 champions from across Costa Rica. During his visit, he described Odyssey 2050s objective as getting young people from across the globe to 'engage with their environment and inspiring them to change it for the better' and he described the project as 'valuable' offering a unique voice and perspective.

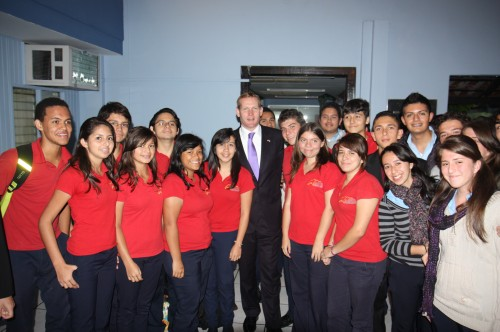
Jeremy Browne working with the Odyssey 2050 team in Costa Rica

In May 2011, the President of Costa Rica, Laura Chinchilla and Minister of Culture Manuel Obregon declared Odyssey 2050 of 'Public and Cultural Interest'.

The 47 minute Spanish version of the film made its television premier in Costa Rica on Channel 13 in December 2012.

In 2013 and 2014 Odyssey 2050 partnered with British rock band Coldplay on a new version of the film featuring a remix of Coldplay's hit song 'Viva La Vida'. The licensing agreement was coordinated through UK NGO Artist Project Earth.

In June 2014 the Canadian Junior Rangers of Quebec Canada hosted Odyssey 2050 workshops at their annual summer camp which took place at Canadian Forces Base Valcartier. Young people from Quebec's most remote communities shared their perspectives on dealing with climate change in their communities and a new Odyssey 2050 short film was produced by Kenneth Callow.

In December 2017 Bruce Callow hosted an Odyssey 2050 workshop for local children in Costa Rica's Santa Rosa National Park in celebration of the 1st anniversary of the "Quiero Dejar Una Huella Verde" program.
