= STS-111 =

2002 American crewed spaceflight to the ISS

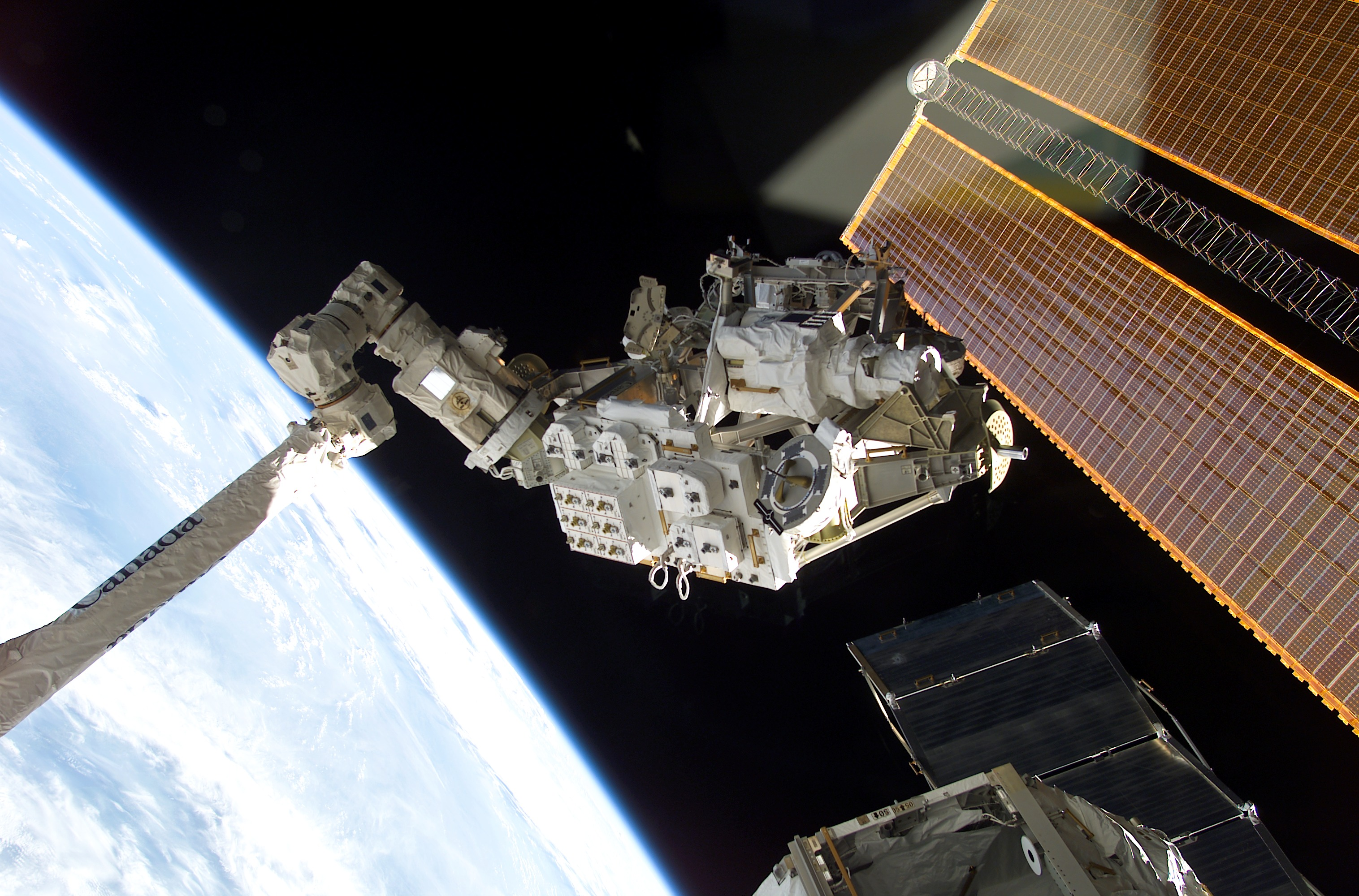
- Canadarm2 grapples the Mobile Base System, prior to its installation on the ISS' Mobile Servicing System
- Names: Space Transportation System-111
- Mission type: ISS logistics Crew rotation
- Operator: NASA
- COSPAR ID: 2002-028A
- SATCAT no.: 27440
- Mission duration: 13 days, 20 hours, 35 minutes, 56 seconds
- Distance travelled: 9,300,000 kilometres (5,800,000 mi)

Spacecraft properties
- Spacecraft: Space Shuttle Endeavour
- Launch mass: 116,523 kilograms (256,889 lb)
- Landing mass: 99,385 kilograms (219,106 lb)
- Payload mass: 12,058 kilograms (26,583 lb)

Crew
- Crew size: 7
- Members: Kenneth D. Cockrell; Paul S. Lockhart; Philippe Perrin; Franklin Chang Díaz
- Launching: Valery G. Korzun; Peggy A. Whitson; Sergey Y. Treshchov
- Landing: Yury I. Onufriyenko; Carl E. Walz; Daniel W. Bursch

Start of mission
- Launch date: 5 June 2002 21:22:49 UTC
- Launch site: Kennedy, LC-39A

End of mission
- Landing date: 19 June 2002 17:58:45 UTC
- Landing site: Edwards, Runway 22

Orbital parameters
- Reference system: Geocentric
- Regime: Low Earth
- Perigee altitude: 349 kilometres (217 mi)
- Apogee altitude: 387 kilometres (240 mi)
- Inclination: 51.6 degrees
- Period: 91.9 minutes

Docking with ISS
- Docking port: PMA-2 (Destiny forward)
- Docking date: 7 June 2002 16:25 UTC
- Undocking date: 15 June 2002 14:32 UTC
- Time docked: 7 days, 22 hours, 7 minutes
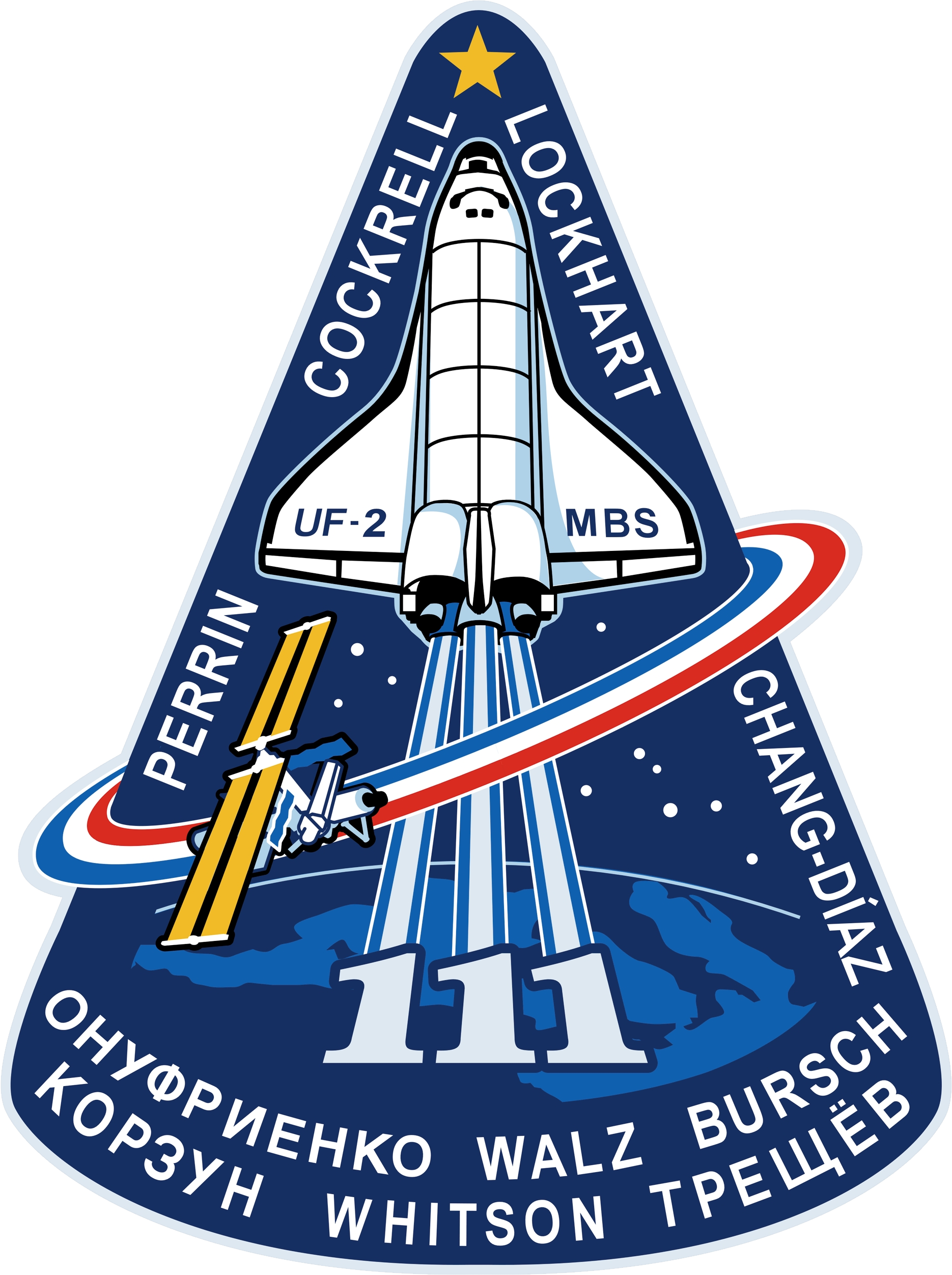
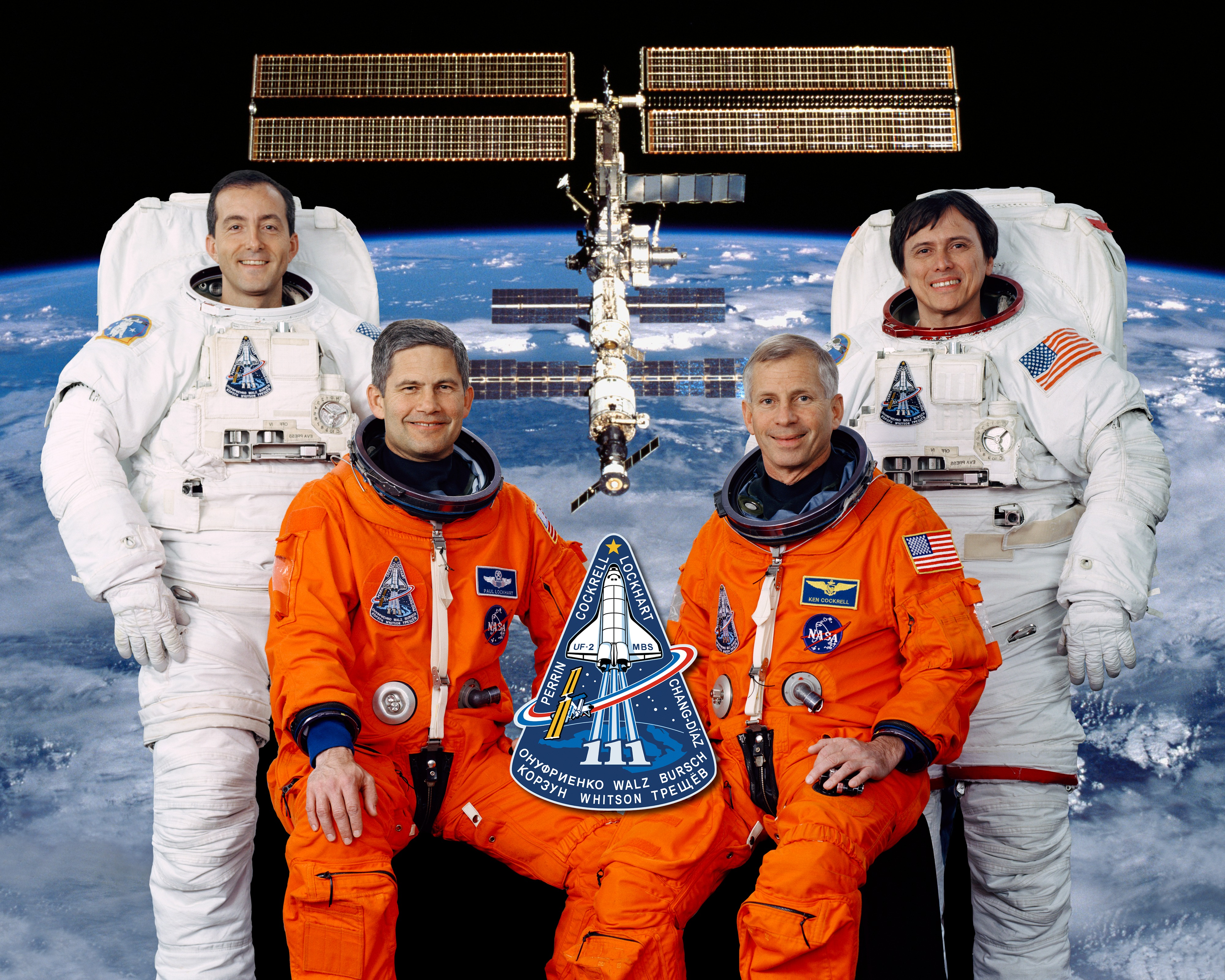
- (L-R): Philippe Perrin, Paul S. Lockhart, Kenneth D. Cockrell, Franklin R. Chang-Diaz Space Shuttle program

STS-111 was a space shuttle mission to the International Space Station (ISS) flown by Space Shuttle Endeavour. STS-111 resupplied the station and replaced the Expedition 4 crew with the Expedition 5 crew. It was launched on 5 June 2002, from Kennedy Space Center, Florida.

== Crew ==
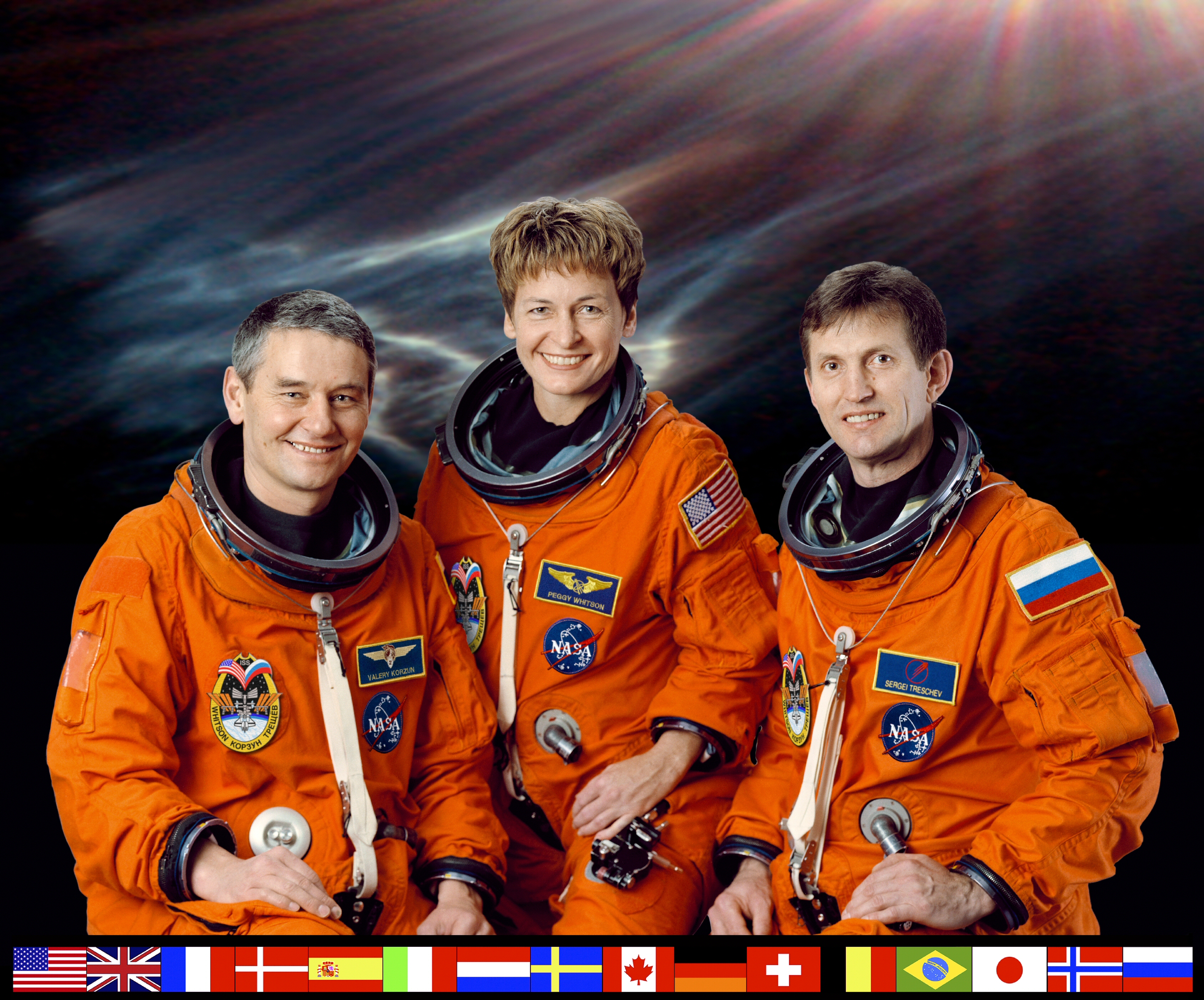
Launched Expedition 5 crew

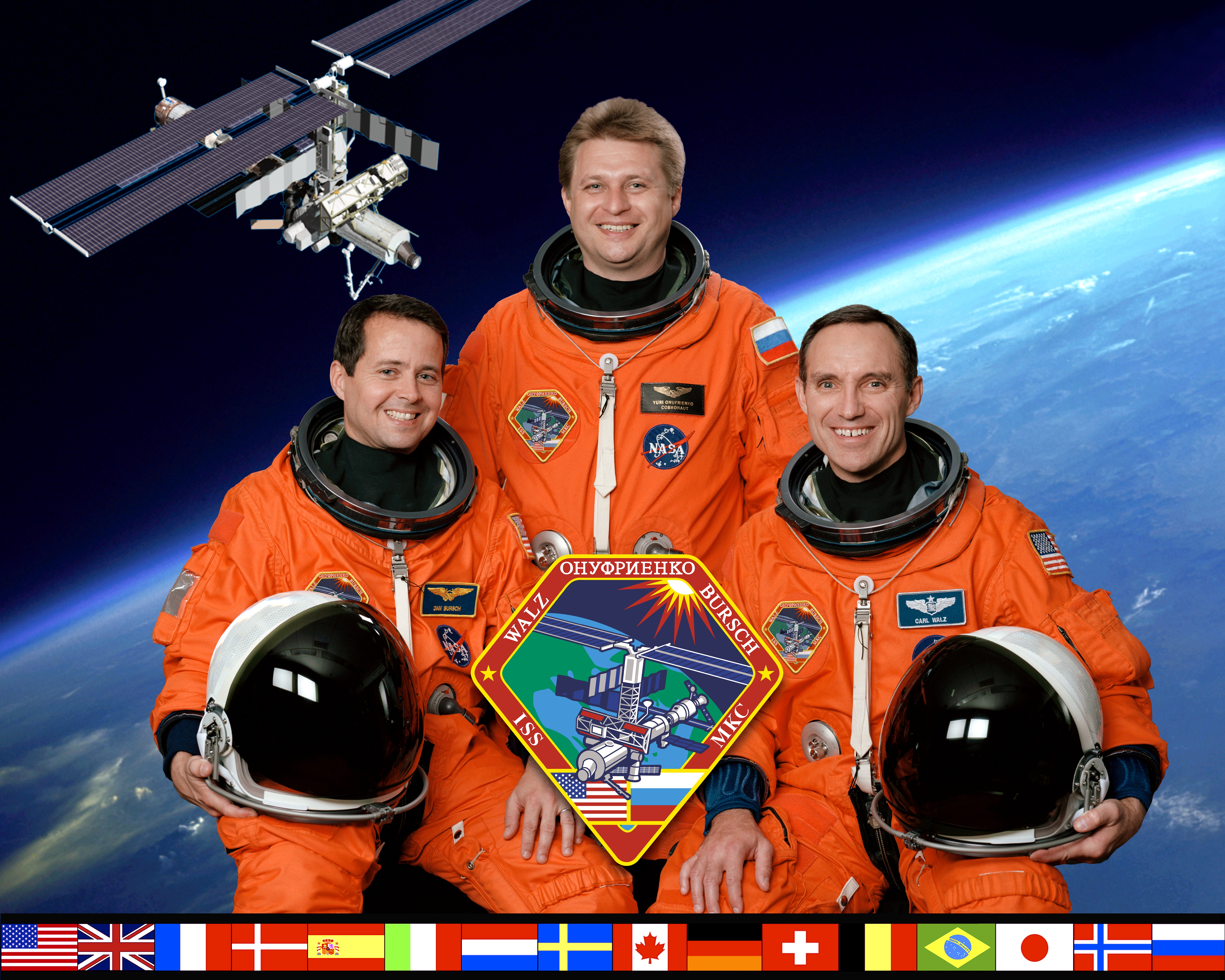
Landed Expedition 4 crew

Position	Launching Astronaut	Landing Astronaut
Commander	(United States) Kenneth D. Cockrell; Fifth and last spaceflight	
Pilot	(United States) Paul S. Lockhart; First spaceflight	
Mission Specialist 1	(France) Philippe Perrin, CNES; Only spaceflight	
Mission Specialist 2 Flight Engineer	(United States) / (Costa Rica) Franklin Chang-Díaz; Seventh and last spaceflight	
Mission Specialist 3	(Russia) Valery G. Korzun, RKA; Expedition 5 Second and last spaceflight ISS Commander/Soyuz Commander	(Russia) Yury I. Onufriyenko, RKA; Expedition 4 Second and last spaceflight ISS Commander/Soyuz Commander
Mission Specialist 4	(United States) Peggy A. Whitson; Expedition 5 First spaceflight ISS Flight Engineer	(United States) Carl E. Walz; Expedition 4 Fourth and last spaceflight ISS Flight Engineer
Mission Specialist 5	(Russia) Sergey Y. Treshchov, RKA; Expedition 5 Only spaceflight ISS Flight Engineer	(United States) Daniel W. Bursch; Expedition 4 Fourth and last spaceflight ISS Flight Engineer

== Mission highlights ==
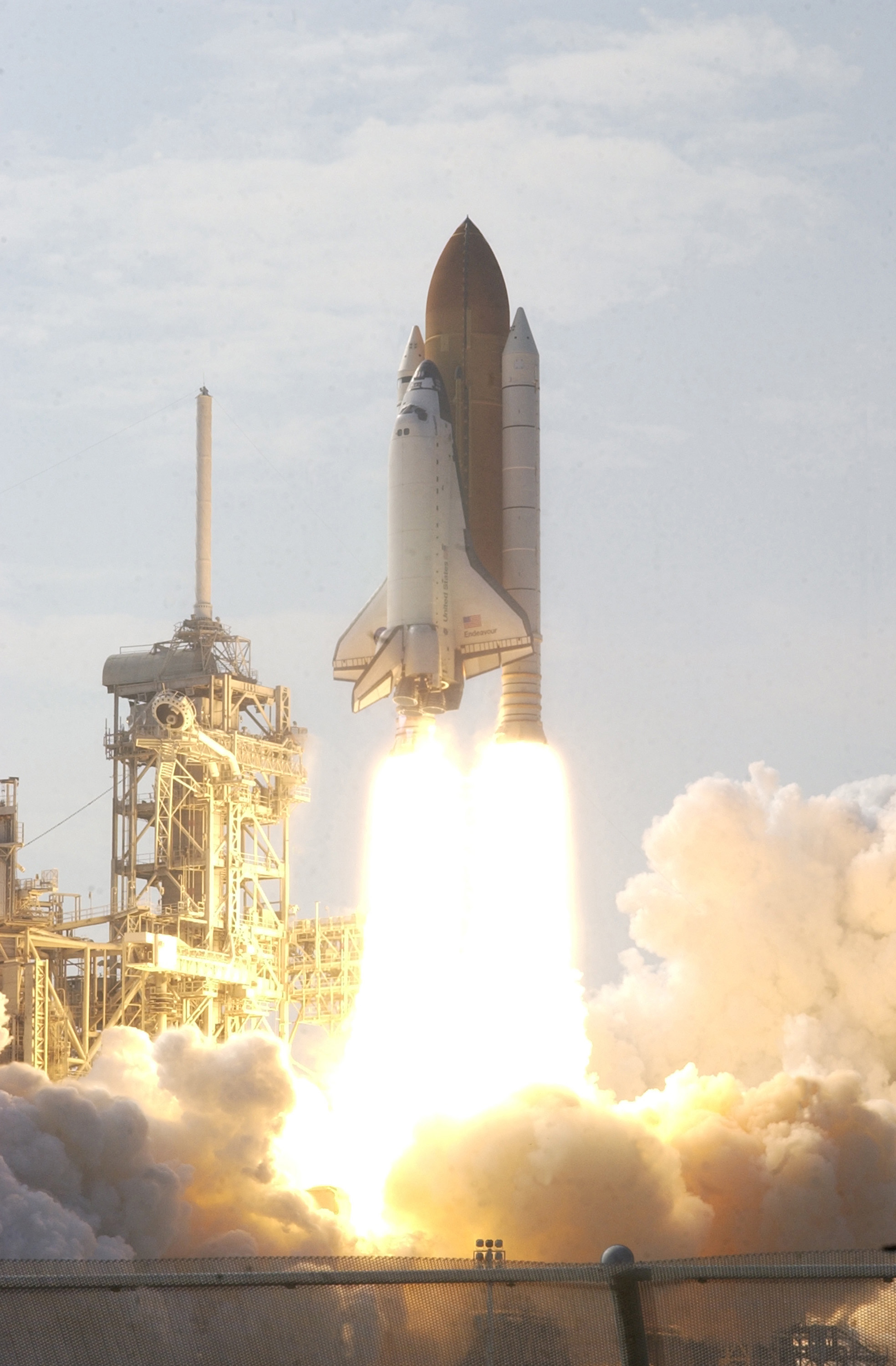
STS-111 launches from Kennedy Space Center, 5 June 2002.

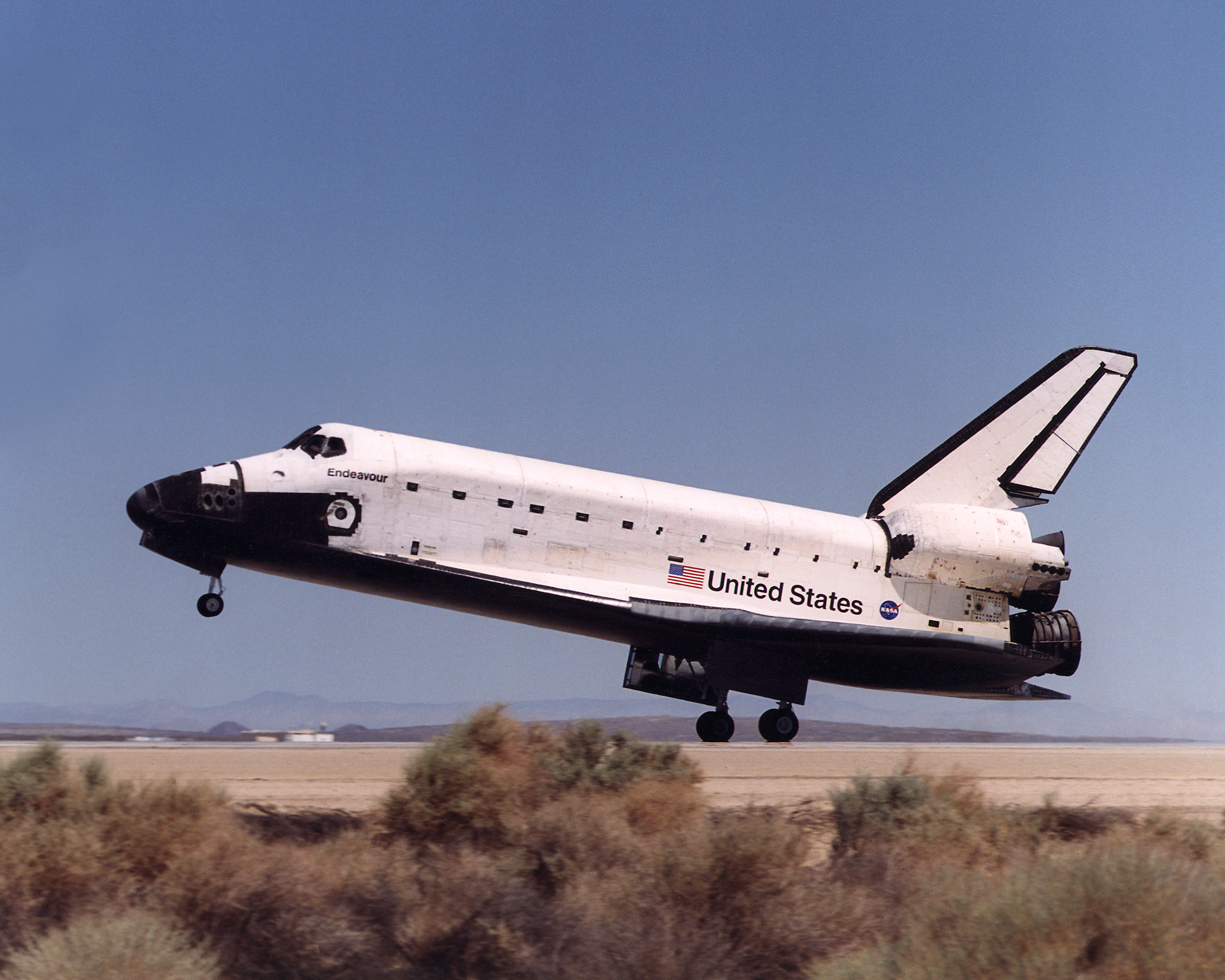
STS-111 lands at Edwards Air Force Base, 19 June 2002.

STS-111, in addition to providing supplies, rotated the crews aboard the International Space Station, exchanging the three Expedition 4 members (1 Russian, 2 American) for the three Expedition 5 members (2 Russian, 1 American).

The Multi-Purpose Logistics Module (MPLM) carried experiment racks and three stowage and resupply racks to the station. The mission also installed a component of the Canadarm2 called the Mobile Base System (MBS) to the Mobile Transporter (MT) (which was installed during STS-110); This was the second component of the Canadian Mobile Servicing System, or MSS. This gave the mechanical arm the capability to "inchworm" from the U.S. Lab fixture to the MBS and travel along the Truss to work sites.

STS-111 was the last flight of a CNES astronaut, the French agency having disbanded its astronaut group and transferred them to the ESA.

=== Crew seat assignments ===
Seat	Launch	Landing	Seats 1–4 are on the flight deck. Seats 5–7 are on the mid-deck.
1	Cockrell		Seats 1–4 are on the flight deck. Seats 5–7 are on the mid-deck.
2	Lockhart		Seats 1–4 are on the flight deck. Seats 5–7 are on the mid-deck.
3	Perrin	Unused	Seats 1–4 are on the flight deck. Seats 5–7 are on the mid-deck.
4	Chang-Diaz		Seats 1–4 are on the flight deck. Seats 5–7 are on the mid-deck.
5	Whitson	Perrin	Seats 1–4 are on the flight deck. Seats 5–7 are on the mid-deck.
6	Korzun	Walz	Seats 1–4 are on the flight deck. Seats 5–7 are on the mid-deck.
7	Treshchov	Onufriyenko	Seats 1–4 are on the flight deck. Seats 5–7 are on the mid-deck.
8	Unused	Bursch	

=== Spacewalks ===
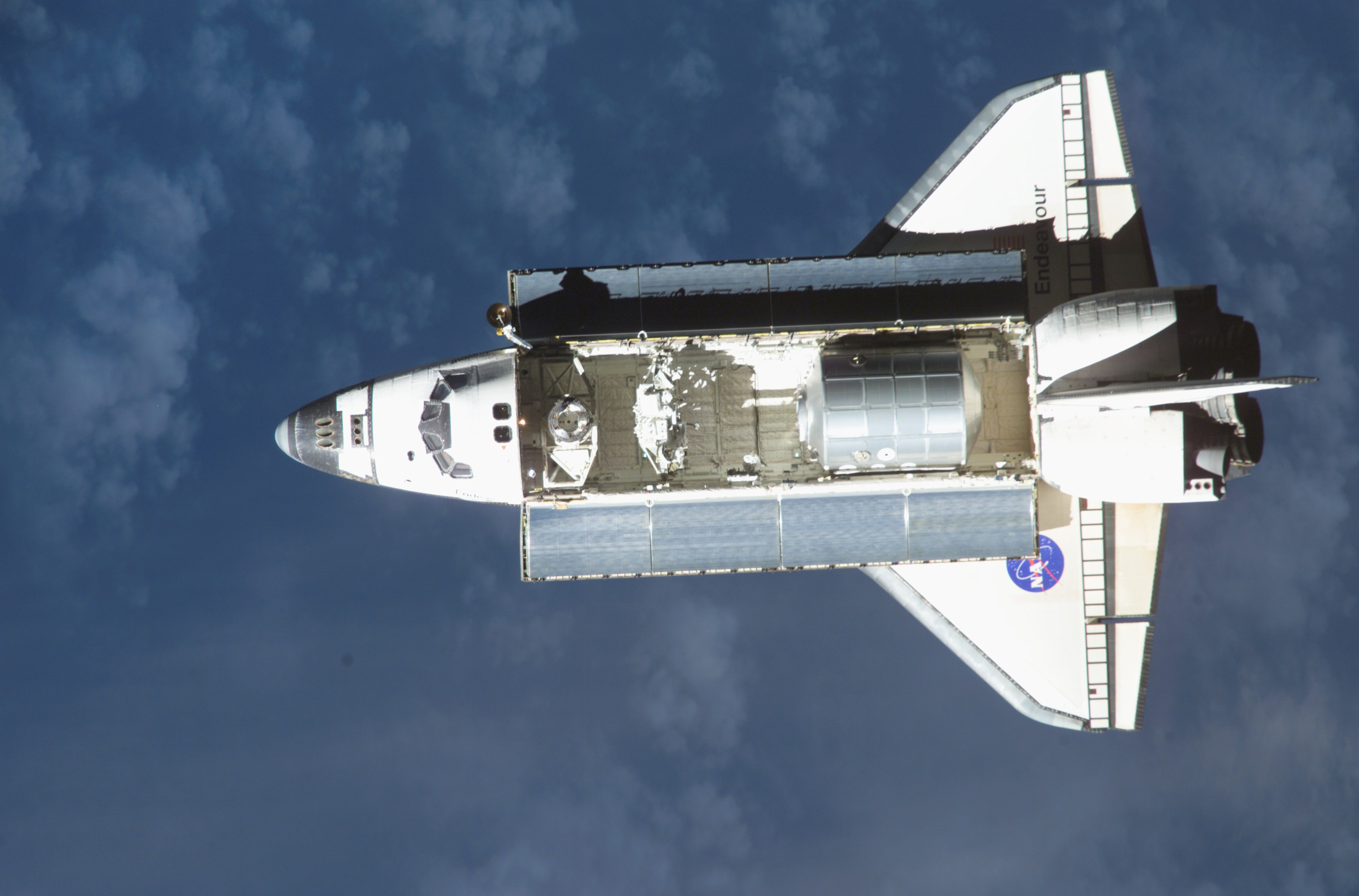
Endeavour carrying the Multi-Purpose Logistics Module on its approach to the ISS on STS-111

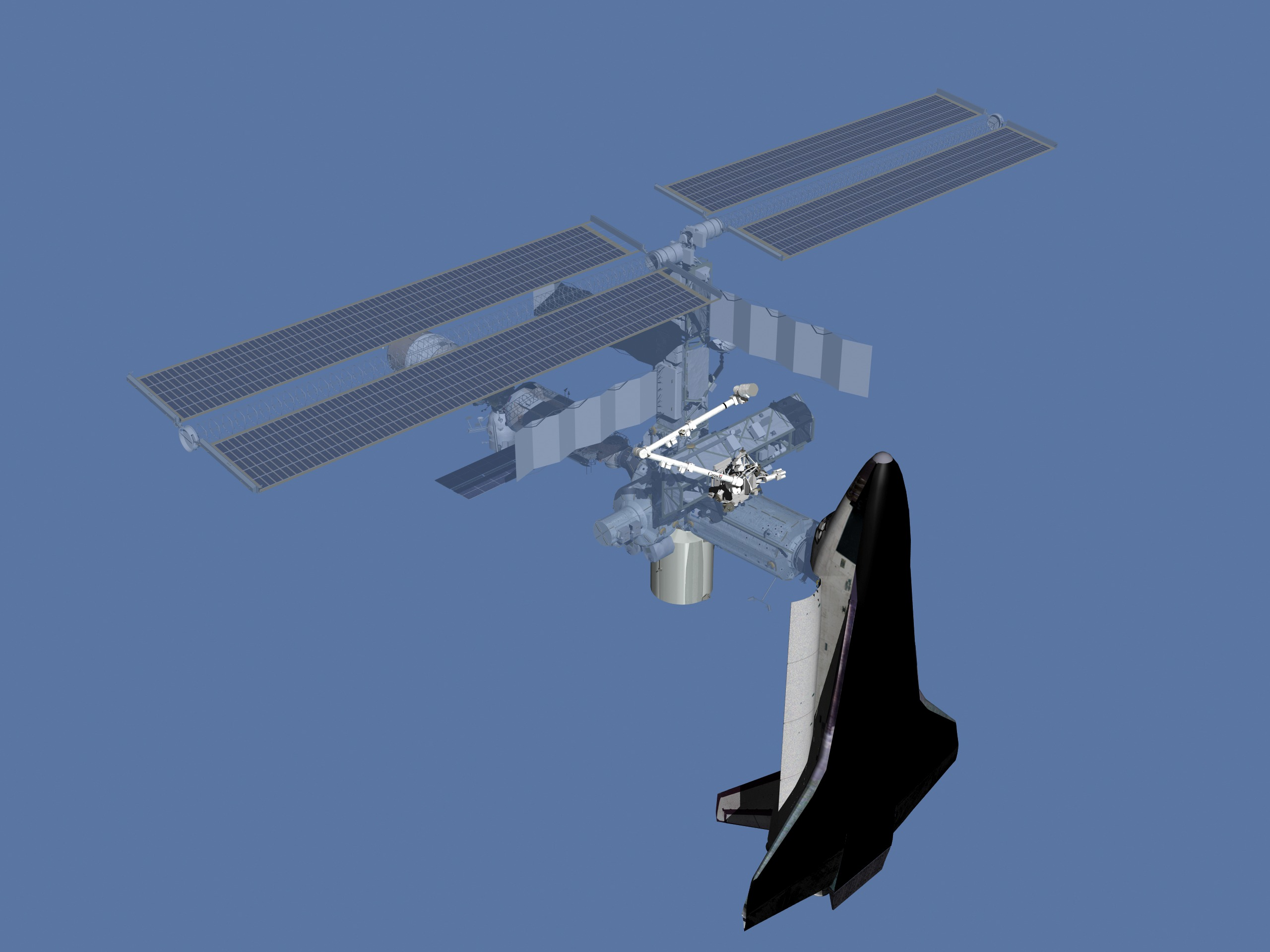
Illustration of the International Space Station during STS-111

	Mission	Spacewalkers	Start – UTC	End – UTC	Duration	Mission
39.	STS-111; EVA 1	Franklin R. Chang-Diaz; Philippe Perrin	9 June 2002; 15:27	9 June 2002; 22:41	7 h, 14 min	Attached Power and Data Grapple Fixture to P6 Truss
40.	STS-111; EVA 2	Franklin R. Chang-Diaz; Philippe Perrin	11 June 2002; 15:20	11 June 2002; 20:20	5 h, 00 min	Attached Mobile Base System to Mobile Transporter
41.	STS-111; EVA 3	Franklin R. Chang-Diaz; Philippe Perrin	13 June 2002; 15:16	13 June 2002; 22:33	7 h, 17 min	Replace Canadarm2 wrist joint

Attempt	Planned	Result	Turnaround	Reason	Decision point	Weather go (%)	Notes
1	30 May 2002, 7:44:26 pm	Scrubbed	—	Weather	30 May 2002, 7:21 pm (T−00:09:00 hold)	40%	Thunderstorms and electrical activity. Due to a post 9/11 security policy, NASA did not reveal the exact launch time until 24 hours before liftoff.
2	31 May 2002, 7:21:52 pm	Scrubbed	0 days 23 hours 37 minutes	Weather	31 May 2002, 9:45 am	20%	Scrubbed before tanking had begun, concerns of continued bad weather including hail.
3	3 Jun 2002, 4:00:00 pm	Scrubbed	2 days 20 hours 38 minutes	Technical	2 Jun 2002, 12:00 am	20%	Nitrogen valve problems. The exact launch time had not been released, with NASA only stating that launch would occur between 4:00 PM and 8:00 PM.
4	5 Jun 2002, 5:22:49 pm	Success	2 days 1 hour 23 minutes			Initially 60%, later improved.	

== Media ==
Launch video (3 mins 11 secs)

Landing video (2 mins 29 secs)

== See also ==
- List of human spaceflights
- List of International Space Station spacewalks
- List of Space Shuttle missions
- List of spacewalks and moonwalks 1965–1999
- Outline of space science
