= Franklin Chang-Díaz =

American astronaut and entrepreneur (born 1950)

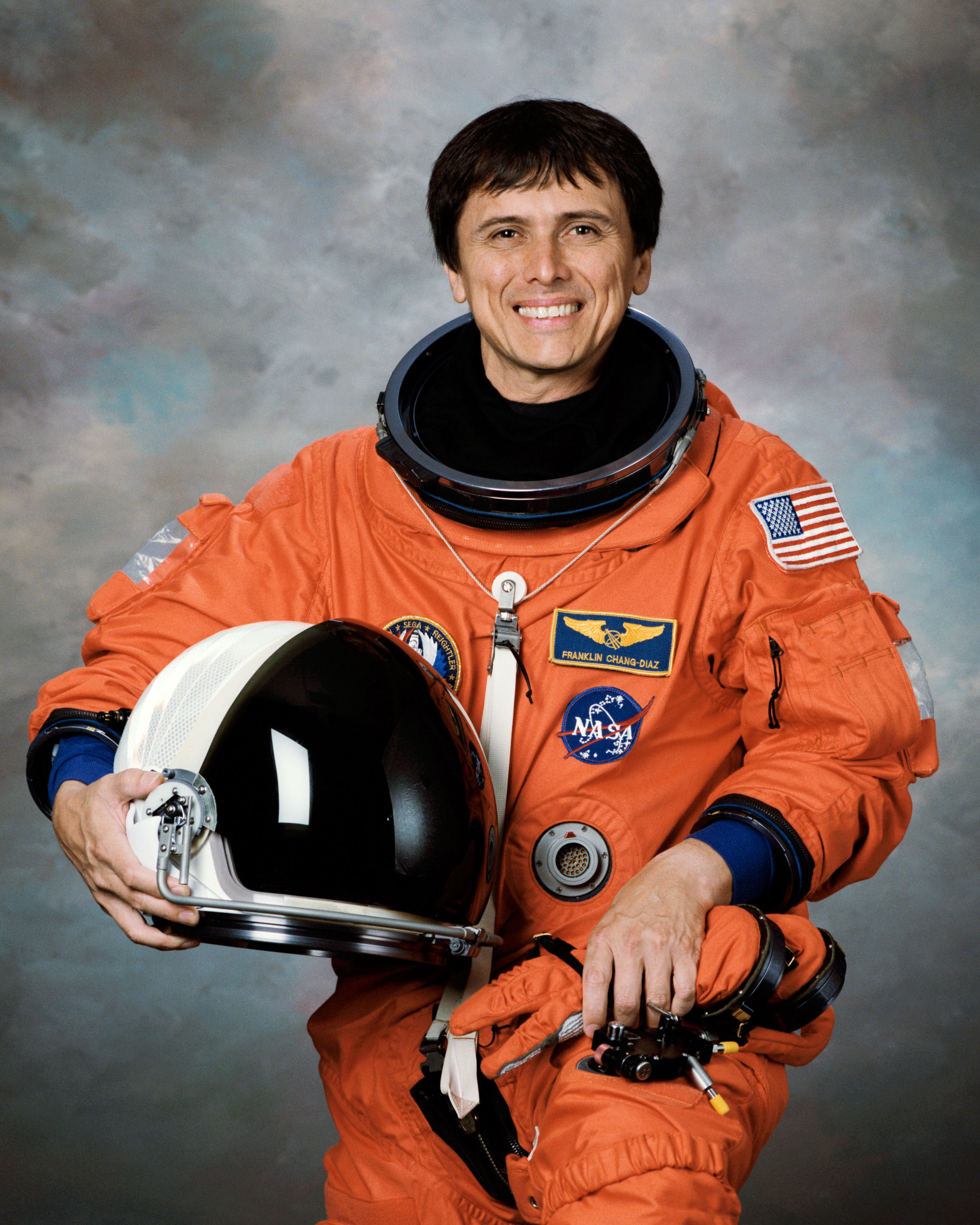
- Chang-Díaz in 1997
- Born: Franklin Ramón Chang-Díaz; April 5, 1950 (age 76); San José, Costa Rica
- Education: University of Connecticut (BS); Massachusetts Institute of Technology (MS, ScD)
- Children: Sonia
- Space career

NASA astronaut
- Time in space: 66d 18h 16m
- Selection: NASA Group 9 (1980)
- Total EVAs: 3
- Total EVA time: 19h, 31m
- Missions: STS-61-C; STS-34; STS-46; STS-60; STS-75; STS-91; STS-111
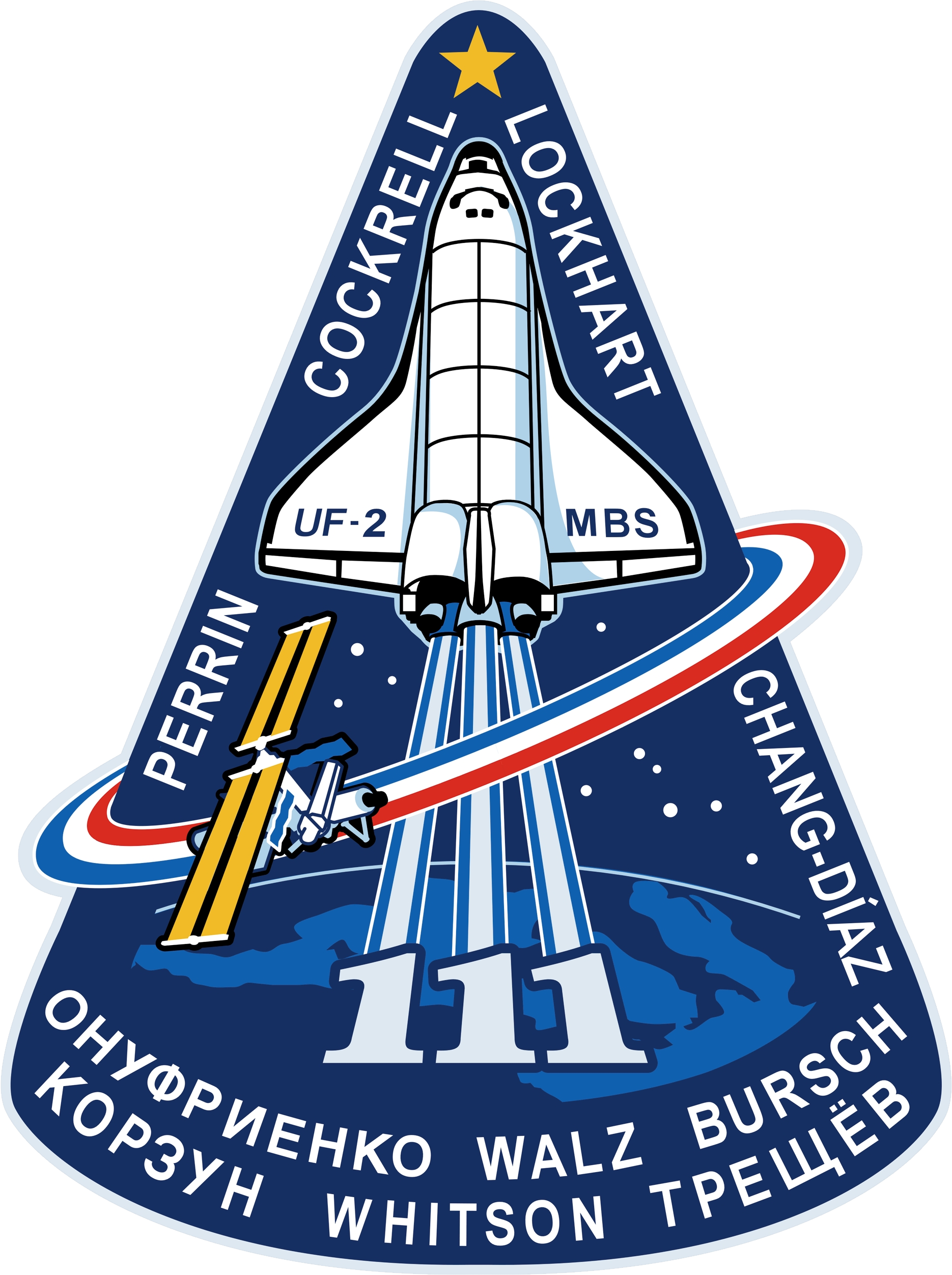
- Mission insignia

Franklin Ramon Chang-Díaz (born April 5, 1950) is a American mechanical engineer, physicist, and former NASA astronaut. He is the sole founder and CEO of Ad Astra Rocket Company as well as a member of the Cummins' board of directors. He became a U. S. citizen in 1977.

He is a veteran of seven Space Shuttle missions, tying the record, as of 2021 for the most spaceflights (a record set two months earlier by Jerry L. Ross). He was the third Latin American, and the first Latin American immigrant NASA astronaut selected to go into space. Chang-Díaz is a member of NASA's Astronaut Hall of Fame.

== Family and education ==
Franklin Chang-Díaz was born in San José, Costa Rica on April 5, 1950, to Ramón Ángel Chang Morales, an oil worker whose own father fled from China during the Boxer Rebellion and María Eugenia Díaz Romero. One of six children, his brothers and sisters still reside in Costa Rica. His two eldest daughters with his ex-wife Candice Chang, include Sonia Rosa, who was a member of the Massachusetts Senate until 2023. He married Dr. Peggy Marguerite Doncaster (née Stafford, of Alexandria, Louisiana), in the United States, on December 17, 1984. They have two daughters, both born in Houston, Texas.

He graduated from Colegio de La Salle in San Jose with an "A" grade in November 1967, then moved to the United States to finish his high school education at Hartford Public High School in Connecticut, in 1969. He went on to attend the University of Connecticut, where he earned a Bachelor of Science degree in mechanical engineering and joined the federal TRIO Student Support Services program in 1973. He then attended the Massachusetts Institute of Technology (MIT), where he earned a Doctor of Philosophy degree in applied plasma physics in 1977. For his graduate research at Massachusetts Institute of Technology (MIT), Chang-Díaz worked in the field of fusion technology and plasma-based rocket propulsion. Post-graduation from Massachusetts Institute of Technology (MIT) in 1979, Chang-Díaz was responsible for developing a novel technique that used an inertial fusion reactor chamber to accurately align fuel pellets to collide with one another in order to create a fusion event.

== NASA career ==
Chang-Díaz was selected as an astronaut candidate by NASA in 1980, and first flew aboard Space Shuttle mission STS-61-C in 1986. Subsequent missions included STS-34 (1989), STS-46 (1992), STS-60 (1994), STS-75 (1996), STS-91 (1998), and STS-111 (2002). During STS-111, he performed three extravehicular activities (EVAs) with Philippe Perrin as part of the construction of the International Space Station (ISS). He was also director of the Advanced Space Propulsion Laboratory at the Johnson Space Center from 1993 to 2005. Chang-Díaz retired from NASA in 2005.

== Post-NASA career ==
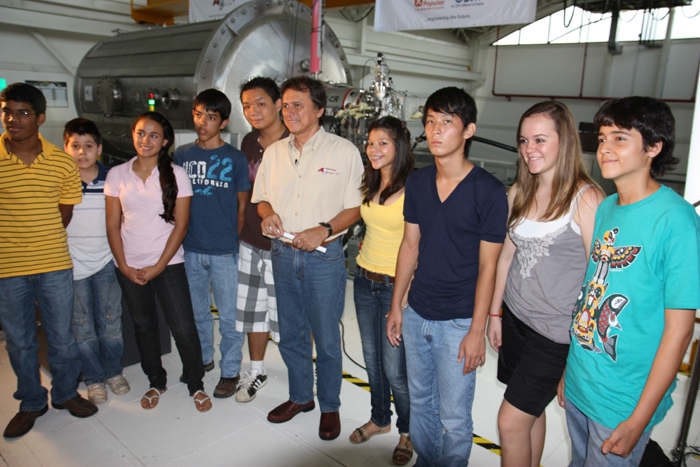
Chang-Díaz with students during the filming of Odyssey 2050 The Movie at Ad Astra Rocket Company, 2010.

After leaving NASA, Chang-Díaz set up the Ad Astra Rocket Company, which became dedicated to the development of advanced plasma rocket propulsion technology. Years of research and development have produced the Variable Specific Impulse Magnetoplasma Rocket (VASIMR), an electrical propulsion device for use in space. With a flexible mode of operation, the rocket can achieve very high exhaust speeds, and with a sufficiently powerful electrical supply even has the theoretical capability to take a crewed rocket to Mars in 39 days.

Chang-Díaz also is active in environmental protection and raising awareness about climate change, notably in his role in Odyssey 2050 The Movie in which he encourages young people to get motivated about environmental issues.

In addition, he is an adjunct professor in physics and astronomy at Rice University. He has been on the board of directors of Cummins since December 8, 2009.

He is also the father of Democratic candidate for the 2022 Massachusetts gubernatorial election Sonia Chang-Díaz.

== Awards and honors ==
In 1986, Franklin Chang-Díaz was one of twelve recipients of the Medal of Liberty. He was inducted into the NASA Astronaut Hall of Fame on May 5, 2012 in a ceremony that took place in the Kennedy Space Center Visitor Complex. Also, due to his career and scientific success, he has been decorated multiple times in Costa Rica and named Honor Citizen by the national legislature. The Costa Rican National High Technology Center (CeNAT), among other institutions, is named after him. In 2014, Chang-Díaz was awarded the "Buzz Aldrin Quadrennial Space Award" by The Explorers Club. Buzz Aldrin, whom Chang-Díaz called a childhood hero, presented the award..

== See also ==
- List of Asian American astronauts
- List of Hispanic astronauts
- Space exploration
