= Expedition 4 =

4th long duration stay in the International space station

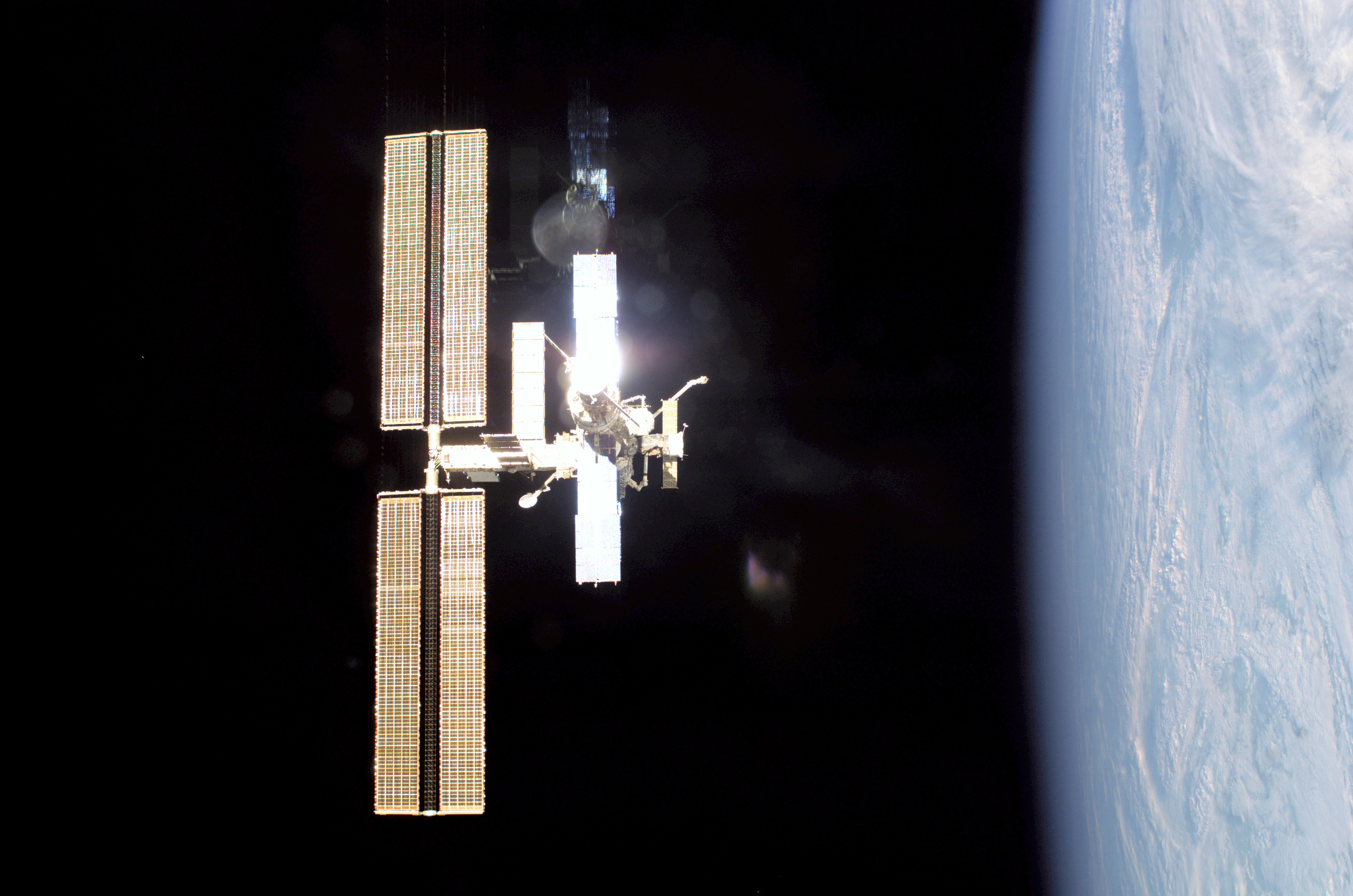
- ISS as seen from Shuttle Endeavour during Expedition 4
- Mission type: Long-duration expedition
- Mission duration: 190 days, 5 hours, 31 minutes (at ISS); 195 days, 11 hours, 38 minutes, 13 seconds (launch to landing)
- Orbits completed: 3,068

Expedition
- Space station: International Space Station
- Began: 7 December 2001, 20:03 UTC
- Ended: 15 June 2002, 14:32 UTC
- Arrived aboard: STS-108; Space Shuttle Endeavour
- Departed aboard: STS-111; Space Shuttle Endeavour

Crew
- Crew size: 3
- Members: Yury Onufrienko; Daniel W. Bursch; Carl E. Walz
- EVAs: 3
- EVA duration: 17 hours, 51 minutes
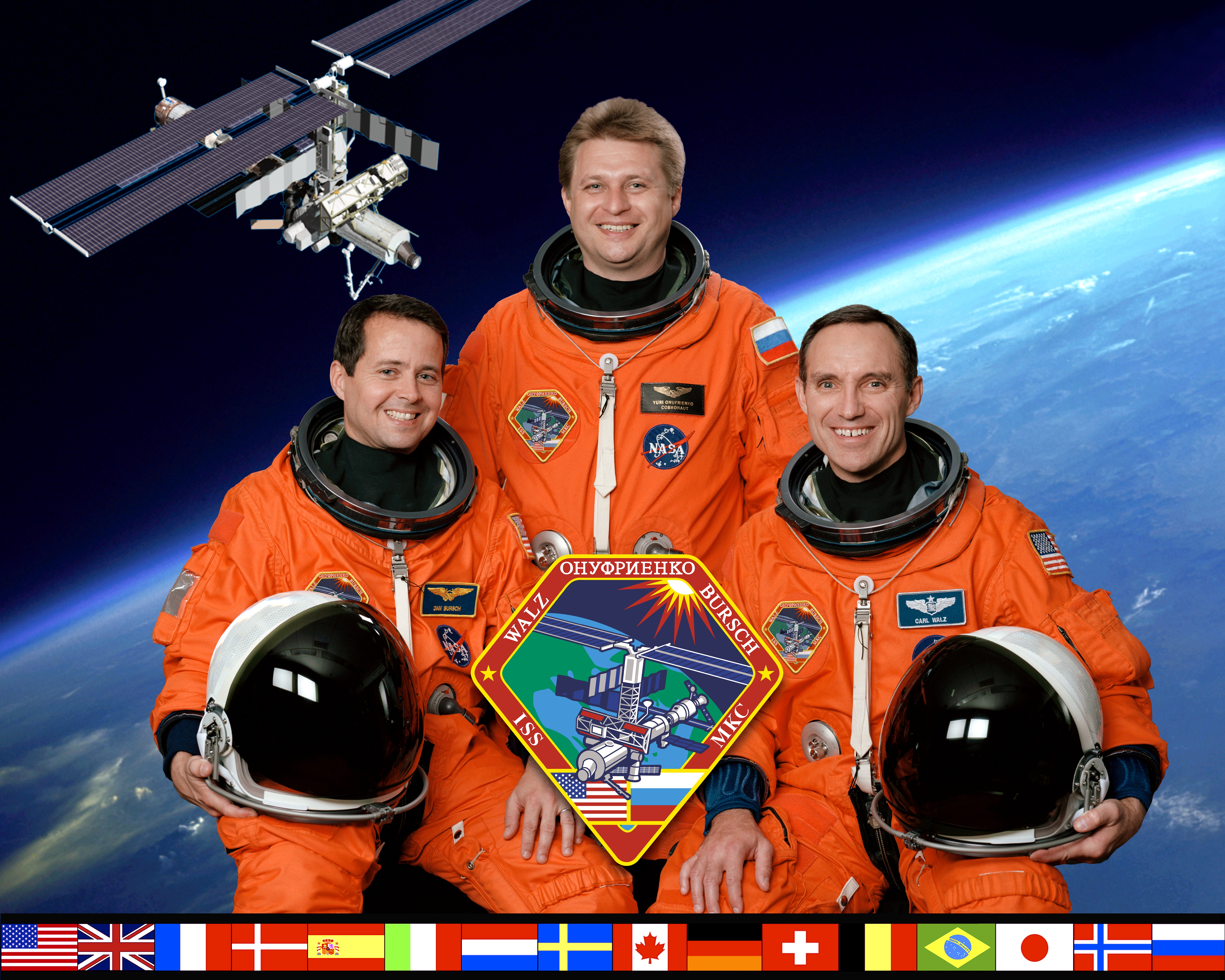
- Expedition 4 mission patch L-R: Daniel W. Bursch, Yuri I. Onufrienko, and Carl E. Walz ISS expeditions

Expedition 4 was the fourth expedition to the International Space Station (7 December 2001 – 15 June 2002).

== Crew ==
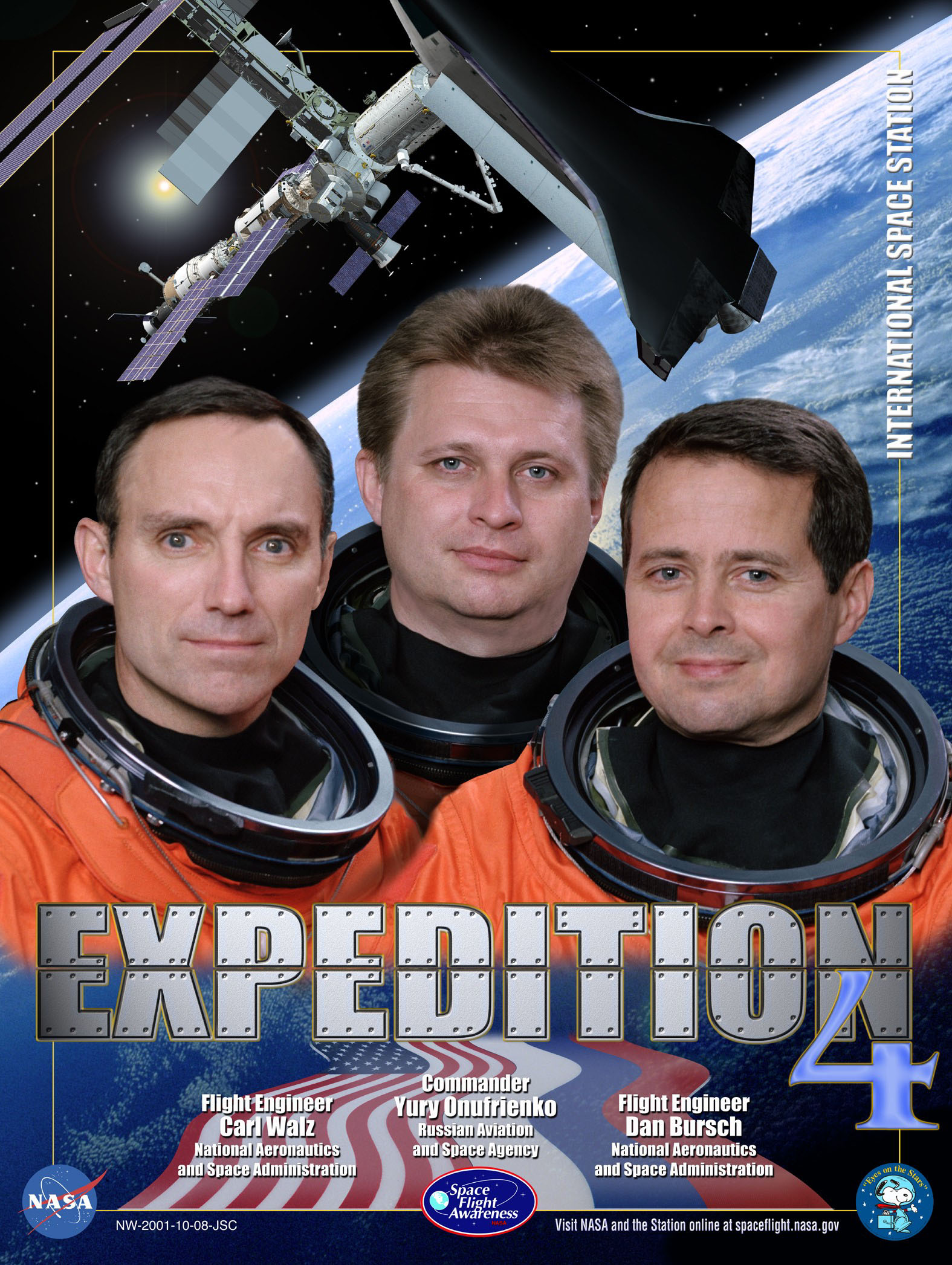
Expedition 4 promotional poster

Prime crew
Position	Crew
Commander	Yury Onufrienko, RSA; Second and last spaceflight
Flight Engineer	Daniel W. Bursch, NASA; Fourth and last spaceflight
Flight Engineer	Carl E. Walz, NASA; Fourth and last spaceflight

Backup crew
Position	Crew
Commander	Gennady Padalka, RSA
Flight Engineer	Stephen K. Robinson, NASA
Flight Engineer	Michael Fincke, NASA

== Mission parameters ==
- Perigee: 384 km
- Apogee: 396 km
- Inclination: 51.6°
- Period: 92 min

== Mission objectives ==
The International Space Station expanded its science investigations, almost doubling the previous amount of experiments performed during the Expedition Four mission. The fourth resident crew launched on 5 December 2001 on board Space Shuttle Endeavour during mission STS-108. They became official station residents at 20:03 UTC on 7 December 2001, and remained on board until June 2002, when they landed on STS-111.

An international crew of three were the fourth crew to live aboard the International Space Station. The team was led by Russian Yuri I. Onufrienko and joined by American crewmates Daniel W. Bursch and Carl E. Walz, both flight engineers. As a part of the STS-108 mission, Endeavour delivered the Expedition 4 crew to the station. They returned to Earth 19 June 2002, aboard Space Shuttle Endeavour following the STS-111 mission.

== Spacewalks ==
The Expedition Four crew conducted three spacewalks during its stay on board the International Space Station. The crew spent a total of 17 hours and 51 minutes outside the station. These spacewalks brought the total up to 34—nine station-based and 25 shuttle-based—that have been conducted at the station for total of 208 hours and 5 minutes.

Mission	Spacewalkers	Start (UTC)	End (UTC)	Duration
Expedition 4 EVA 1	Yury Onufrienko; Carl Walz	14 January 2002; 20:59	15 January 2002; 03:02	6 hours 3 minutes
Expedition 4 EVA 1	Onufrienko and Walz relocated the cargo boom for the Russian Strela crane. They moved the boom from Pressurized Mating Adapter 1 to the exterior of the Pirs Docking Compartment. The crew also installed an amateur radio antenna onto the end of the Zvezda Service Module. The space walk was based out of the Pirs Airlock and used Russian Orlan space suits.			
Expedition 4 EVA 2	Onufrienko; Daniel Bursch	25 January 2002; 15:19	25 January 2002; 21:18	5 hours 59 minutes
Expedition 4 EVA 2	During Expedition Four's second spacewalk, Onufrienko and Bursch installed six deflector shields for the Zvezda Service Module's jet thrusters. Also, they installed an amateur radio antenna, attached four science experiments, and retrieved and replaced a device to measure material from the thrusters. Like the first EVA, this one was based out of Pirs, and the spacewalkers used Orlan suits.			
Expedition 4 EVA 3	Walz; Bursch	20 February 2002; 15:19	20 February 2002; 17:25	5 hours 49 minutes
Expedition 4 EVA 3	This spacewalk was based out of the Quest Airlock, using U.S. spacesuits. Walz and Bursch tested the airlock and prepared for the four spacewalks that were to be performed during STS-110 in April. The STS-110 crew were to install the S0 Truss onto the station. This spacewalk was the first spacewalk to be based out of Quest without a space shuttle at the station.			
