= Carl E. Walz =

American astronaut (born 1955)

Carl Walz
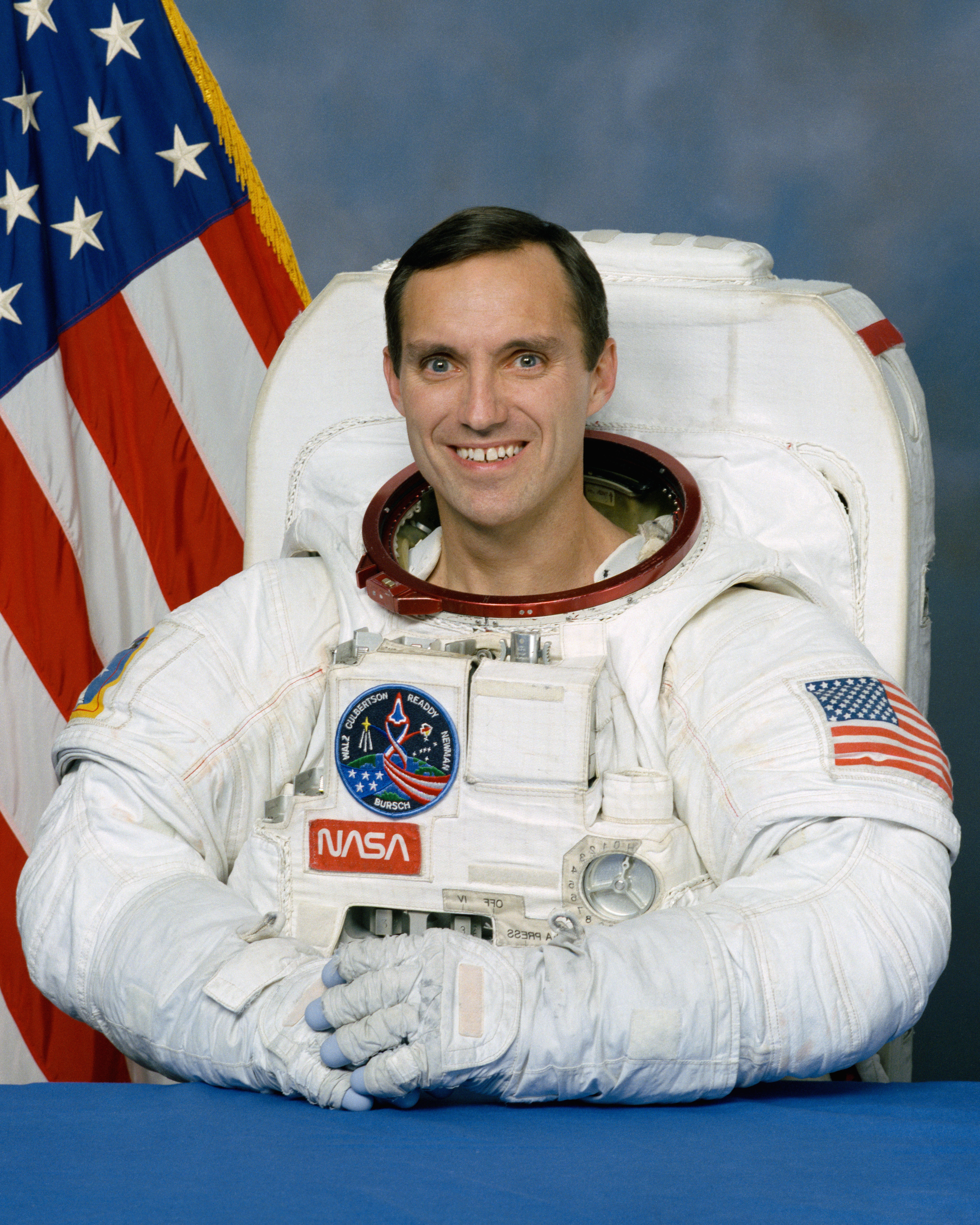
- Walz in July 1995
- Born: Carl Erwin Walz; September 6, 1955 (age 71); Cleveland, Ohio, U.S.
- Education: Kent State University (BS); John Carroll University (MS)
- Space career

NASA astronaut
- Rank: Colonel, USAF
- Time in space: 230d 13h 4m
- Selection: NASA Group 13 (1990)
- Total EVAs: 3 (1 during STS-51, 2 during Expedition 4)
- Total EVA time: 18h, 55m
- Mission: STS-51; STS-65; STS-79; Expedition 4 (STS-108 / STS-111)
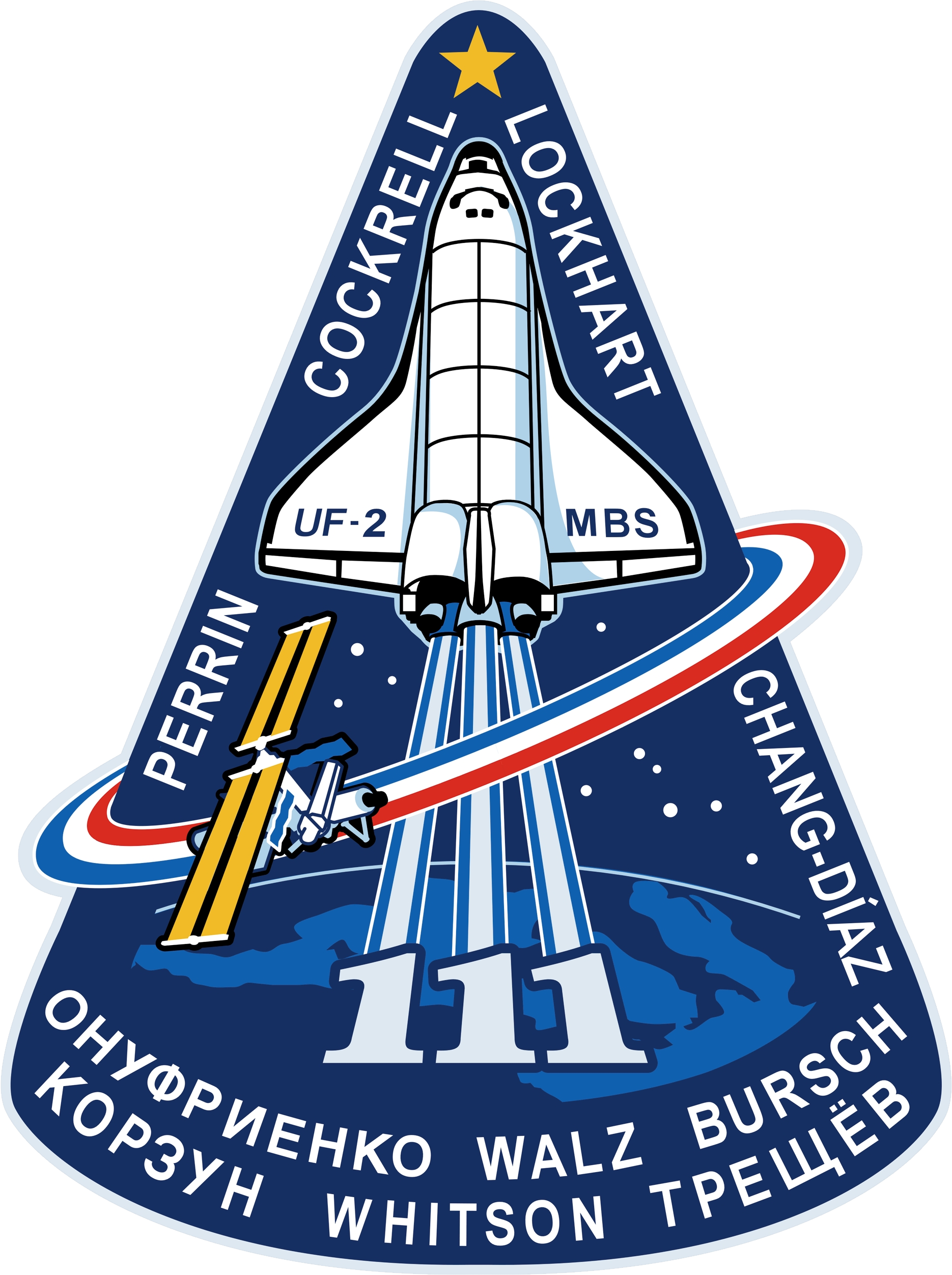
- Mission insignia

Carl Erwin Walz (born 6 September 1955) is a retired NASA astronaut currently working for Orbital Sciences Corporation's Advanced Programs Group as vice president for Human Space Flight Operations. Walz was formerly assigned to the Exploration Systems Mission Directorate at NASA Headquarters in Washington, D.C. He was the Acting Director for the Advanced Capabilities Division in the Exploration Systems Mission Directorate, and was responsible for a broad range of activities to include Human Research, Technology Development, Nuclear Power and Propulsion and the Lunar Robotic Exploration Programs to support the Vision for Space Exploration.

== Personal life ==
Walz was born on September 6, 1955, in Cleveland, Ohio, and is married to the former Pamela J. Glady of Lyndhurst, Ohio. They have two children. He enjoys piano and vocal music, sports, and was notably the lead singer for Max Q, a rock-and-roll band composed of astronauts.

== Education ==
Walz graduated from Charles F. Brush High School in Lyndhurst, Ohio in 1973; received a Bachelor of Science degree in physics from Kent State University in 1977; and a Master of Science in solid state physics from John Carroll University in 1979.

== Organizations ==
American Legion, Kent State University Alumni Association, John Carroll University Alumni Association, and the Association of Space Explorers.

== Honors ==
Graduated summa cum laude from Kent State University. Awarded the Defense Superior Service Medal, the USAF Meritorious Service Medal with one Oak Leaf Cluster, the Defense Meritorious Service Medal with one Oak Leaf, the USAF Commendation Medal, and the USAF Achievement Medal with one Oak Leaf Cluster. Distinguished Graduate from the USAF Test Pilot School, Class 83A. Inducted into the Ohio Veterans Hall of Fame. Awarded three NASA Space Flight Medals, NASA Exceptional Service Medal. Distinguished Alumnus Award, Kent State University, 1997.

== Experience ==
From 1979 to 1982, Walz was responsible for analysis of radioactive samples from the United States Atomic Energy Detection System at the 1155th Technical Operations Squadron, McClellan Air Force Base, California. The subsequent year was spent in study as a flight test engineer at the U.S. Air Force Test Pilot School, Edwards Air Force Base, California. From January 1984 to June 1987, Walz served as a Flight Test Engineer to the F-16 Combined Test Force at Edwards Air Force Base, where he worked on a variety of F-16C airframe avionics and armament development programs. From July 1987 to June 1990, he served as a Flight Test Manager at Detachment 3, Air Force Flight Test Center.

== NASA experience ==
Selected by NASA in January 1990, Walz is a veteran of four space flights, and has logged 231 days in space. He was a mission specialist on STS-51 (1993), was the Orbiter flight engineer (MS-2) on STS-65 (1994), was a mission specialist on STS-79 (1996), and served as flight engineer on ISS Expedition 4 (2001–2002).

In 2008, Walz left NASA for private industry. Walz was the Vice President for Human Spaceflight Operations at Orbital Sciences Corporation in Dulles, Virginia, responsible for cargo and mission operations for Orbital's Commercial Resupply Services program from 2008 to 2015. He then joined Oceaneering as Director Business Development.

=== Space flight experience ===
STS-51 Discovery (12–22 September 1993). During the mission, the five-member crew deployed the U.S. Advanced Communications Technology Satellite (ACTS), and the Shuttle Pallet Satellite (SPAS) with NASA and German scientific experiments aboard. Walz also participated in a 7-hour spacewalk (EVA) to evaluate tools for the Hubble Space Telescope servicing mission. The mission was accomplished in 9 days, 22 hours, and 12 minutes.

STS-65 Columbia (8–23 July 1994). STS-65 flew the second International Microgravity Laboratory (IML-2) Spacelab module and carried a crew of seven. During the 15-day flight, the crew conducted more than 80 experiments focusing on materials and life sciences research in microgravity. The mission completed 236 orbits of the Earth, traveling 6.1 million miles, setting a new flight duration record for the Shuttle program.

STS-79 Atlantis (16–26 September 1996). On STS-79 the six-member crew aboard Atlantis docked with the Russian Mir station, delivered food, water, U.S. scientific experiments and Russian equipment, and exchanged NASA long duration crewmembers. During the mission, the Atlantis/Mir complex set a record for docked mass in space. STS-79 was the first flight of the double Spacehab module and landed at KSC after 10 days 3 hours and 13 minutes.

The Expedition 4 crew launched on 5 December 2001, aboard STS-108 and docked with the International Space Station on 7 December 2001. During a 6½ month stay aboard the Space Station, the crew of three (two American astronauts and one Russian cosmonaut) performed flight tests of the station hardware, conducted internal and external maintenance tasks, and developed the capability of the station to support the addition of science experiments. Wearing the Russian Orlan space suit, Walz logged 11 hours and 52 minutes of EVA time in two separate spacewalks. The Expedition 4 crew returned to Earth aboard STS-111, with Endeavour landing at Edwards Air Force Base, California, on 19 June 2002.

With the Expedition 4 mission, Astronauts Bursch and Walz set a new U.S. space endurance record of 195 days 16 hours 33 minutes when they beat the old mark of 188 days set by astronaut Shannon Lucid aboard the Russian Mir space station in 1996.
