= Exterior =

"Exterior" is a noun or adjective referring to the outside of something. It may also refer to:

== Automobiles ==
- Exterior design

== Mathematics ==
- Exterior of a set
- Externology
- Exterior space

== See also ==
- Outside (disambiguation)
- External (disambiguation)
- Interior (disambiguation)
