= STS-92 =

2000 American crewed spaceflight to the ISS

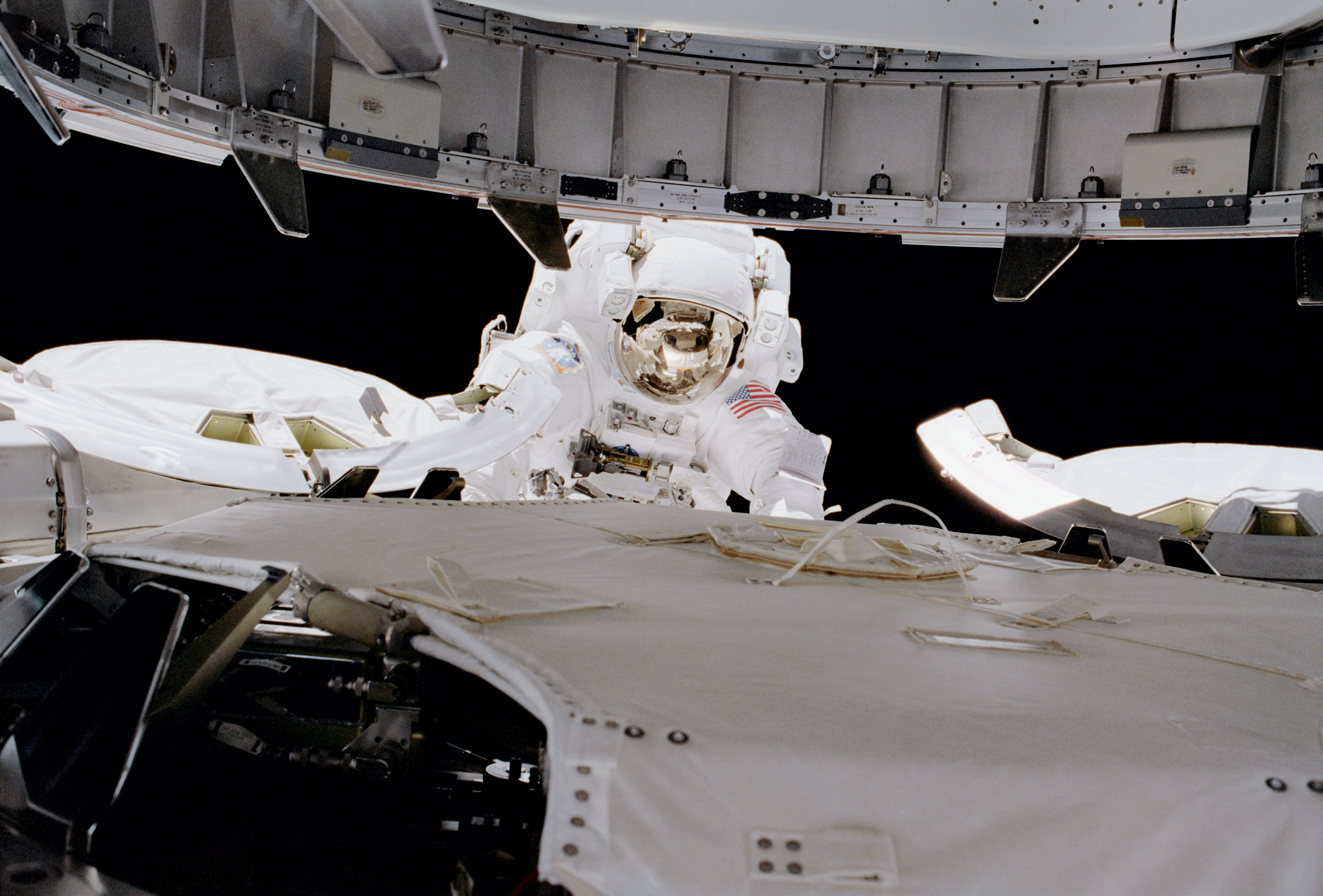
- Wisoff oversees PMA-3 (top) being mated with the nadir port of Unity (bottom) during EVA 2
- Names: Space Transportation System-92
- Mission type: ISS assembly
- Operator: NASA
- COSPAR ID: 2000-062A
- SATCAT no.: 26563
- Mission duration: 12 days, 21 hours, 42 minutes, 42 seconds

Spacecraft properties
- Spacecraft: Space Shuttle Discovery
- Launch mass: 115,127 kg (253,812 lb)
- Landing mass: 92,741 kg (204,459 lb)
- Payload mass: 9,513 kg (20,973 lb)

Crew
- Crew size: 7
- Members: Brian Duffy; Pamela A. Melroy; Koichi Wakata; William S. McArthur; Peter J. K. Wisoff; Michael López-Alegría; Leroy Chiao
- EVAs: 4
- EVA duration: 12 hours, 12 minutes; 1st EVA: 6 hours, 28 minutes; 2nd EVA: 7 hours, 7 minutes; 3rd EVA: 6 hours, 48 minutes; 4th EVA: 6 hours, 56 minutes

Start of mission
- Launch date: 11 October 2000, 23:17:00 UTC (7:17 pm EDT)
- Launch site: Kennedy, LC-39A

End of mission
- Landing date: 24 October 2000, 20:59:42 UTC (1:59:42 pm PDT)
- Landing site: Edwards, Runway 22

Orbital parameters
- Reference system: Geocentric
- Regime: Low Earth
- Perigee altitude: 386 km (240 mi)
- Apogee altitude: 394 km (245 mi)
- Inclination: 51.6°
- Period: 92.3 minutes

Docking with ISS
- Docking port: Unity forward
- Docking date: 13 October 2000, 17:45 UTC
- Undocking date: 20 October 2000, 15:08 UTC
- Time docked: 6 days, 21 hours, 23 minutes
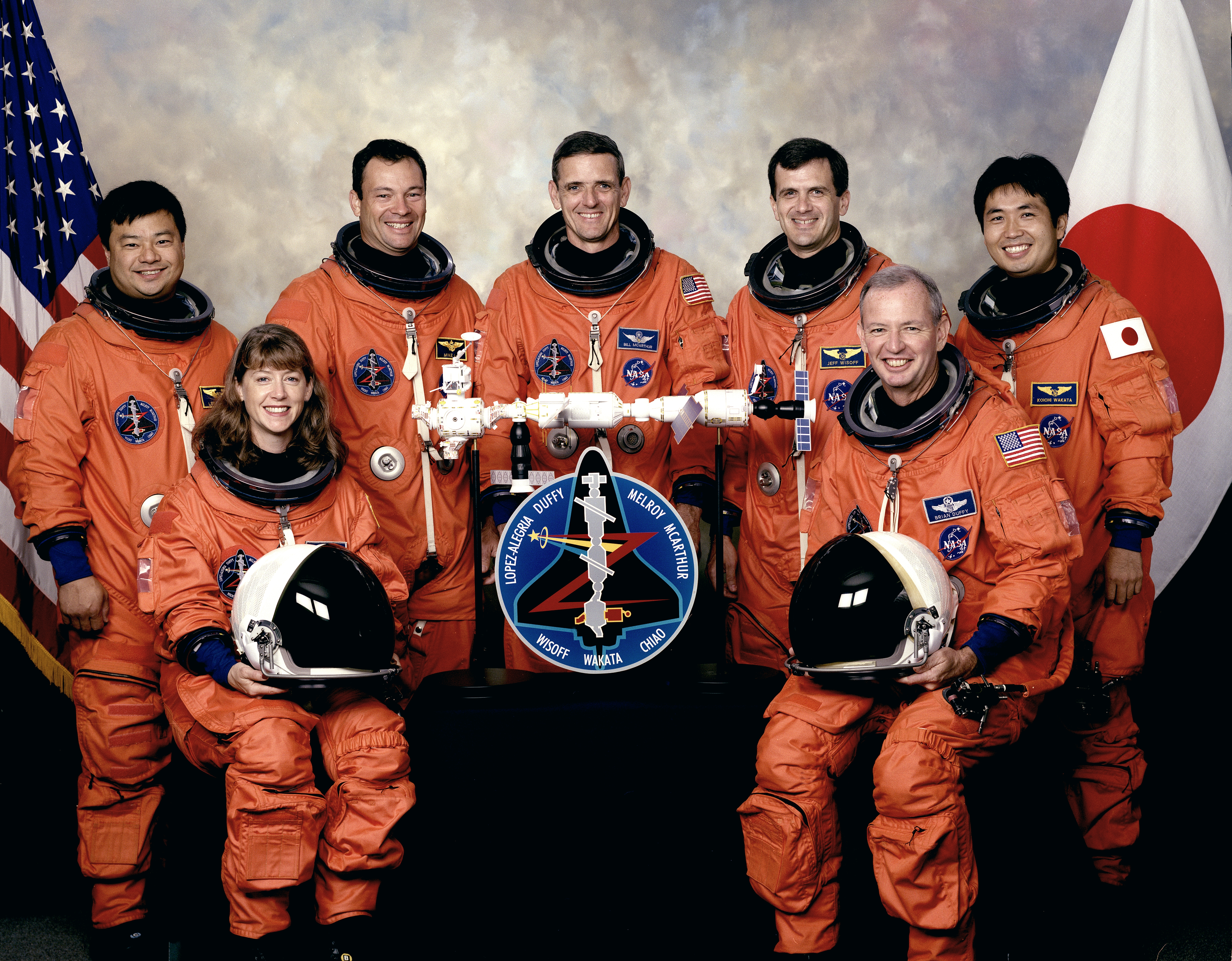
- From left: Chiao, Melroy, Lopez-Alegria, McArthur, Wisoff, Duffy and Wakata Space Shuttle program

STS-92 was a Space Shuttle mission to the International Space Station (ISS) flown by Space Shuttle Discovery. STS-92 marked the 100th mission of the Space Shuttle and Discovery's 28th flight. It was launched from Kennedy Space Center, Florida, 11 October 2000. With the subsequent launch of Soyuz TM-31 on November 2, 2000 to commence Expedition 1, the landing of STS-92 on October 24, 2000 was the final time all humans in space returned to the surface of the Earth as of 2026.

== Crew ==
Position	Astronaut
Commander	(United States) Brian Duffy; Fourth and last spaceflight
Pilot	(United States) Pamela A. Melroy; First spaceflight
Mission Specialist 1	(United States) Leroy Chiao; Third spaceflight
Mission Specialist 2 Flight Engineer	(United States) William S. McArthur; Third spaceflight
Mission Specialist 3	(United States) Peter Wisoff; Fourth and last spaceflight
Mission Specialist 4	(United States) / (Spain) Michael E. López-Alegría; Second spaceflight
Mission Specialist 5	(Japan) Koichi Wakata, JAXA; Second spaceflight

=== Spacewalks ===
EVA 1

- Personnel: Chiao and McArthur
- Start: 15 October 2000 – 14:27 UTC
- End: 15 October 2000 – 20:55 UTC
- Duration: 6 hours, 28 minutes

EVA 2

- Personnel: López-Alegría and Wisoff
- Start: 16 October 2000 – 14:15 UTC
- End: 16 October 2000 – 21:22 UTC
- Duration: 7 hours, 7 minutes

EVA 3

- Personnel: Chiao and McArthur
- Start: 17 October 2000 – 14:30 UTC
- EVA 3 End: 17 October 2000 – 21:18 UTC
- Duration: 6 hours, 48 minutes

EVA 4

- Personnel: López-Alegría and Wisoff
- Start: 18 October 2000 – 15:00 UTC
- End: 18 October 2000 – 21:56 UTC
- Duration: 6 hours, 56 minutes

=== Crew seat assignments ===
Seat	Launch	Landing	Seats 1–4 are on the flight deck. Seats 5–7 are on the mid-deck.
1	Duffy		Seats 1–4 are on the flight deck. Seats 5–7 are on the mid-deck.
2	Melroy		Seats 1–4 are on the flight deck. Seats 5–7 are on the mid-deck.
3	Wakata	Lopez-Alegria	Seats 1–4 are on the flight deck. Seats 5–7 are on the mid-deck.
4	McArthur		Seats 1–4 are on the flight deck. Seats 5–7 are on the mid-deck.
5	Wisoff		Seats 1–4 are on the flight deck. Seats 5–7 are on the mid-deck.
6	Lopez-Alegria	Wakata	Seats 1–4 are on the flight deck. Seats 5–7 are on the mid-deck.
7	Chiao		Seats 1–4 are on the flight deck. Seats 5–7 are on the mid-deck.

== Mission highlights ==
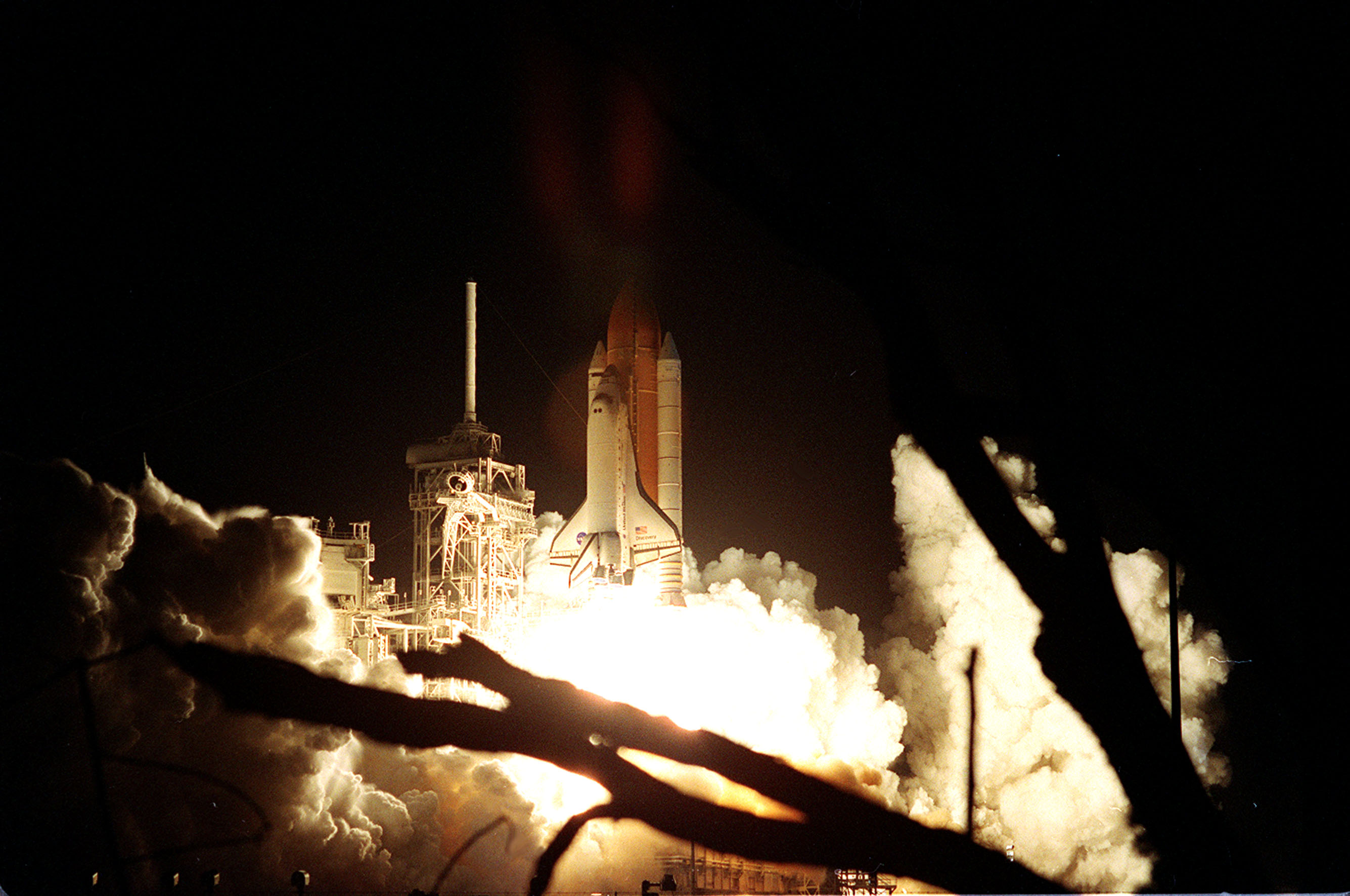
Launch of STS-92

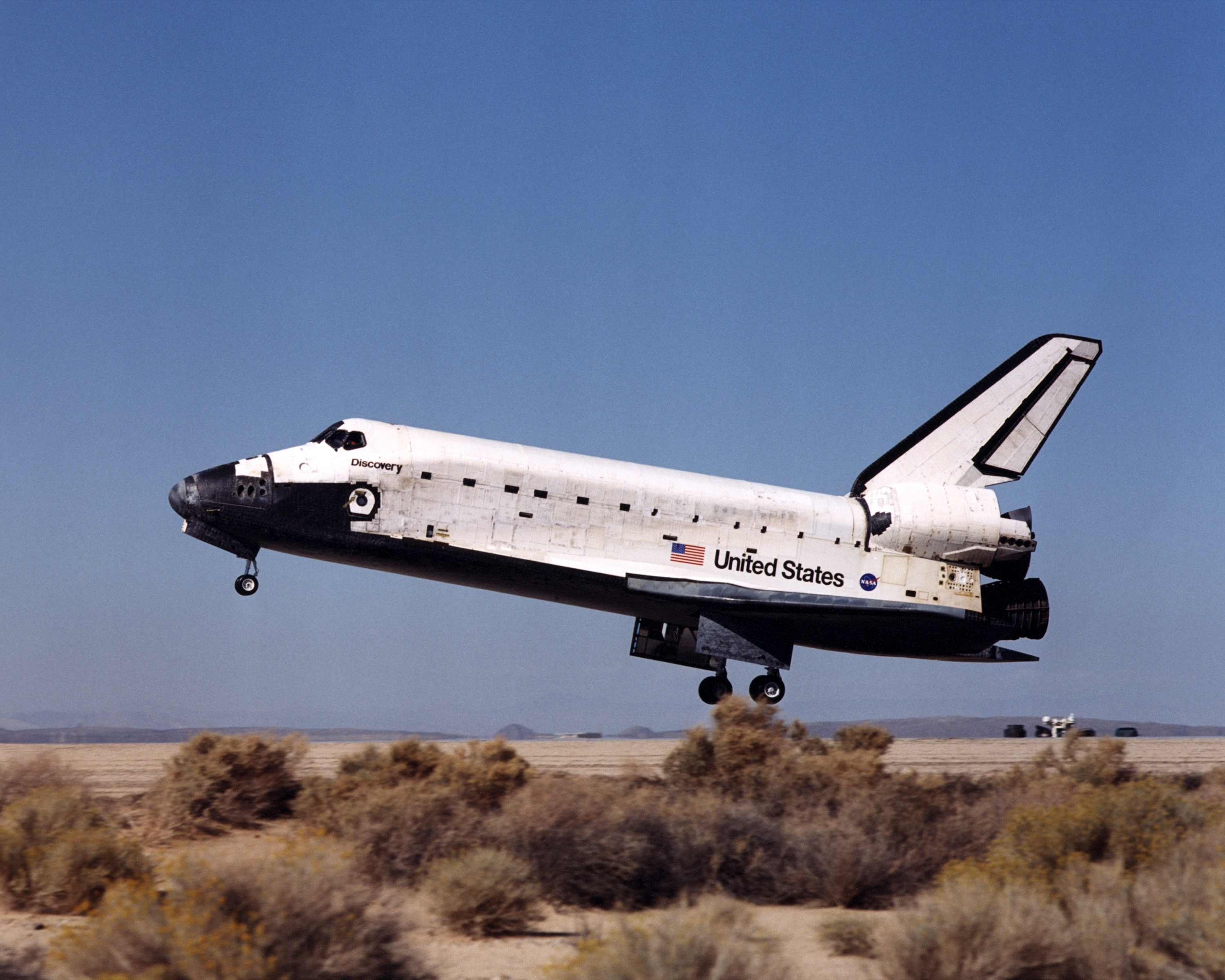
Discovery lands at Edwards Air Force Base, 24 October 2000.

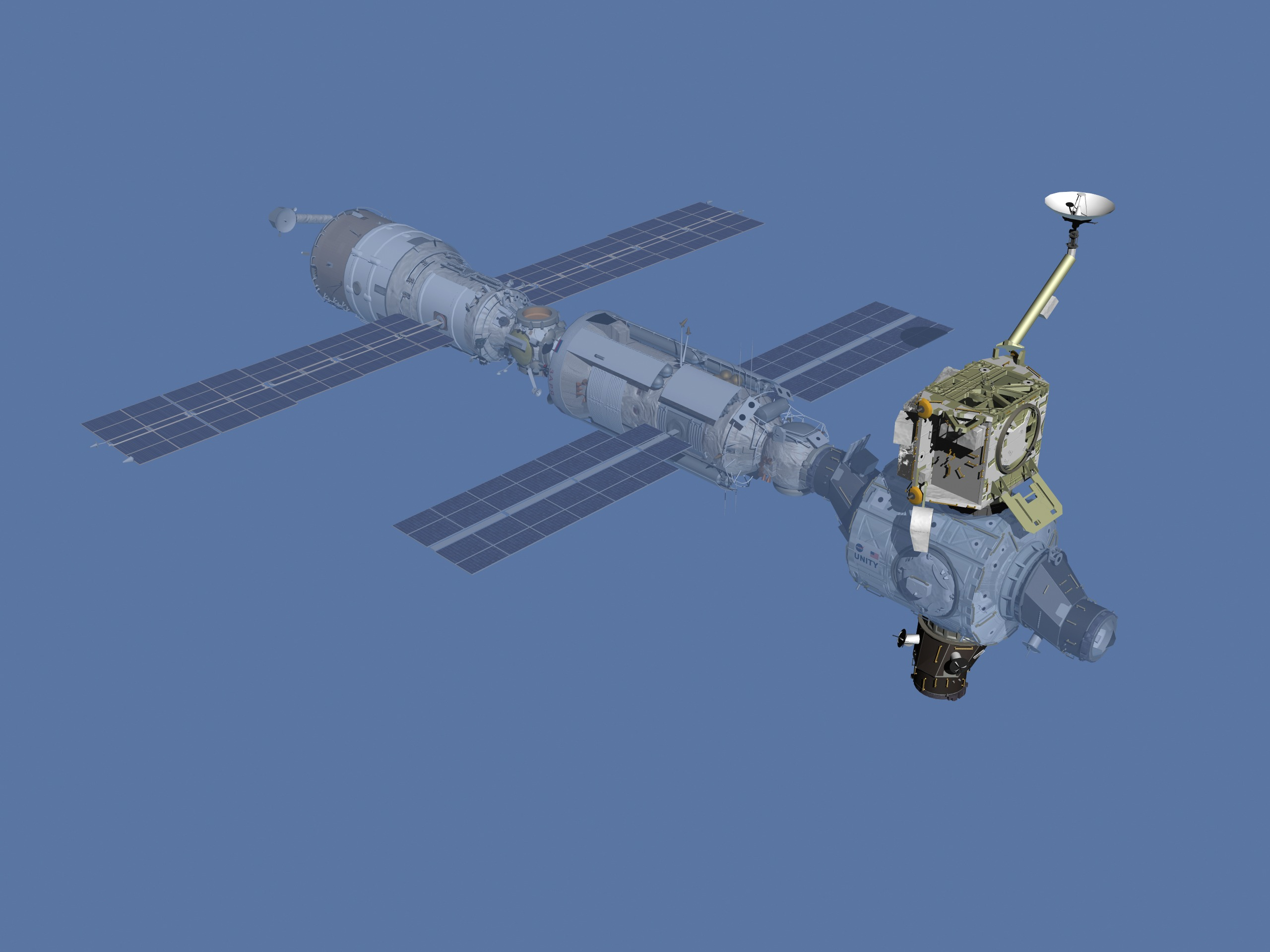
Illustration of the ISS after STS-92.

Attempt	Planned	Result	Turnaround	Reason	Decision point	Weather go (%)	Notes
1	5 Oct 2000, 9:38:26 pm	Scrubbed	—	Technical	5 Oct 2000, 3:15 pm	60	Problems with external tank separation bolts and a main propulsion system valve on Discovery.
2	9 Oct 2000, 8:05:17 pm	Scrubbed	3 days 22 hours 27 minutes	Weather	9 Oct 2000, 9:00 am	30	High winds prevented pre-launch preparations.
3	10 Oct 2000, 7:39:36 pm	Scrubbed	0 days 23 hours 34 minutes	Technical	10 Oct 2000, 6:30 pm (T−00:20:00 hold)	70	A metal pin was found wedged in between the orbiter and external tank in an area that technicians could not access. There was a risk that the pin could dislodge during launch and damage the shuttle.
4	11 Oct 2000, 7:17:00 pm	Success	0 days 23 hours 37 minutes			80	

STS-92 was an ISS assembly flight that brought the Z1 truss, Control Moment Gyros, Pressurized Mating Adapter-3 (PMA-3) (mounted on a Spacelab pallet) and two DDCU (Heat pipes) to the space station. The Z1 truss was the first exterior framework installed on the ISS and allowed the first U.S. solar arrays to be temporarily installed on Unity for early power during flight 4A. The Ku-band communication system supported early science capabilities and U.S. television on flight 6A. The CMGs (Control Moment Gyros) weigh about 27 kilograms (60 lb) and provide non-propulsive (electrically powered) attitude control when activated on flight 5A, and PMA-3 provides shuttle docking port for solar array installation on flight 4A and Destiny Lab installation on flight 5A.

The mission included seven days of docked operations with the space station, four EVAs, and two ingress opportunities.

Over the course of four scheduled spacewalks, two teams of space walkers and an experienced robot arm operator collaborated to install the Z1 (Z for zenith port) truss structure on top of the U.S. Unity connecting node on the growing station and to deliver the third Pressurized Mating Adapter (PMA 3) to the ISS for the future berthing of new station components and to accommodate shuttle dockings.

The Z1 truss was the first permanent lattice-work structure for the ISS, very much like a girder, setting the stage for the future addition of the station's major trusses or backbones. The Z1 fixture also served as the platform on which the huge U.S. solar arrays were mounted on the next shuttle assembly flight, STS-97. The Z1 truss included many elements of the Communications and Tracking subsystem. The hardware included a Transmitter/Receiver/Controller (SGTRC) built by L3 Communications Systems-East in Camden, NJ. John Schina was the Chief Engineer of the ISS Program at L3.

The Z1 contains four large gyroscopic devices, called Control Moment Gyroscope (CMGs), which are used to maneuver the space station into the proper orientation on orbit once they were activated following the installation of the U.S. laboratory.

During the fourth spacewalk, astronauts Wisoff and López-Alegría tested the SAFER jet backpack, flying up to 50 feet while remaining tethered to the spacecraft.

== See also ==
- List of human spaceflights
- List of International Space Station spacewalks
- List of Space Shuttle missions
- List of spacewalks 2000–2014
- Outline of space science
