= List of spacewalks 2000–2014 =

Astronauts walking in space to date

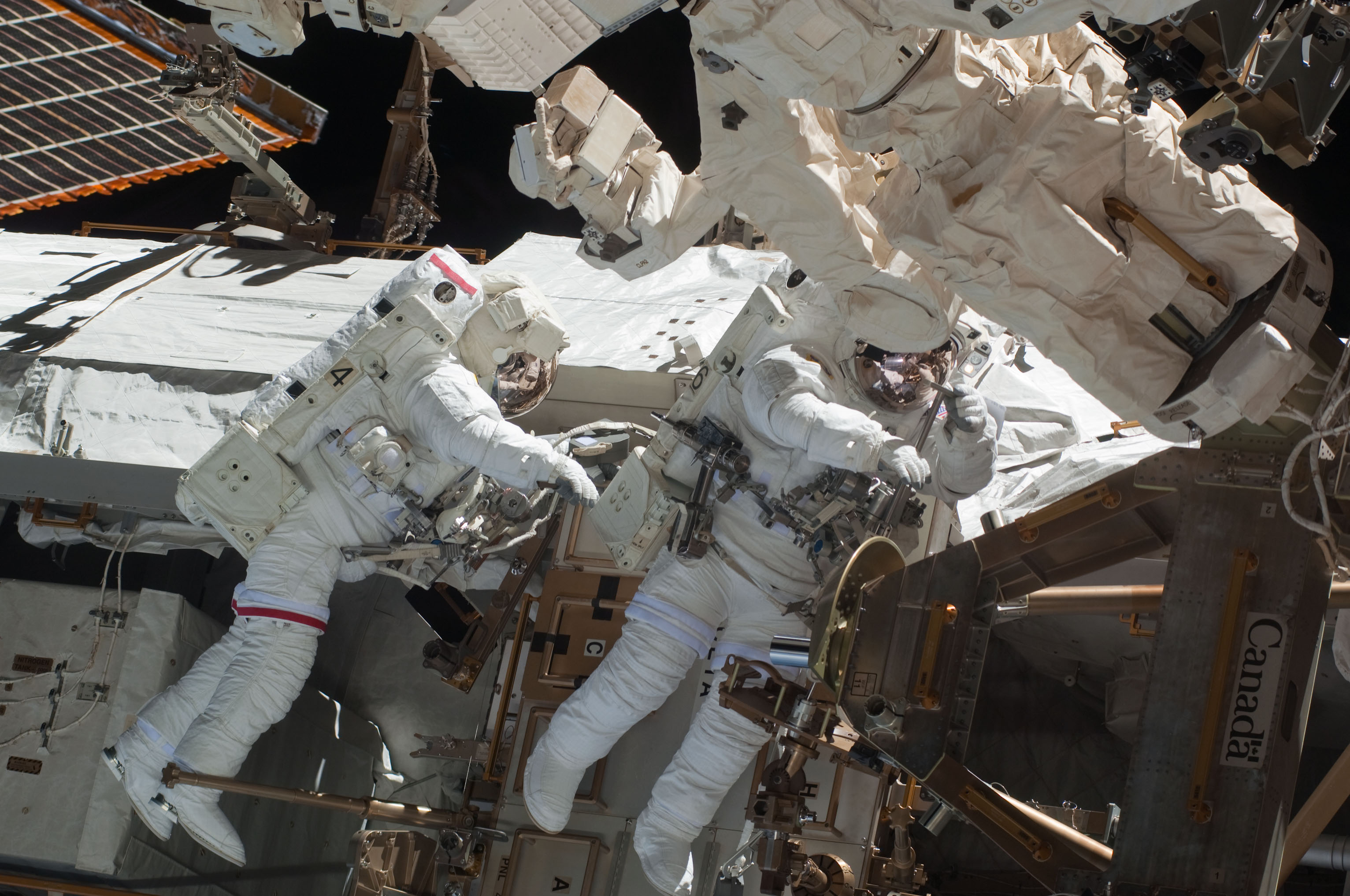
Nicholas Patrick and Robert Behnken in the first EVA of the STS-130 mission on February 12, 2010

This list contains all spacewalks performed between May 12, 2000, and October 22, 2014, where an astronaut fully or partially left a spacecraft.

Since 1981, NASA has measured spacewalk duration from when the suits went to internal power until the start of airlock re-pressurization. Roscosmos has always measured spacewalk duration from the time of hatch opening to hatch closure. These charts typically follow the agency's measurements of spacewalk duration, because those figures tend to be the most readily available, as they are most often provided by the agency.

== 2000–2004 spacewalks ==
Spacewalk beginning and ending times are given in Coordinated Universal Time (UTC).

=== 2000 spacewalks ===
| # | Spacecraft | Spacewalkers | Start (UTC) | End (UTC) | Duration |
|---|---|---|---|---|---|
| 182. | Mir PE-28; EVA 1 | (Russia) Sergei Zalyotin (Russia) Alexander Kaleri | May 12, 2000; 10:44 | May 12, 2000; 15:47 | 5 h, 2 min |
| 182. | Mir PE-28; EVA 1 | Kaleri and Zalyotin tested a leak sealant and inspected a malfunctioning solar panel on Kvant-1. A final photographic record of the outer surfaces of Mir was made during a panoramic inspection. | | | |
| 183. | STS-101; EVA 1 | (United States) James Voss (United States) Jeffrey Williams | May 22, 2000; 01:48 | May 22, 2000; 08:32 | 6 h, 44 min |
| 183. | STS-101; EVA 1 | Voss and Williams inspected and secured a U.S.-built cargo crane known as the Orbital Replacement Unit Transfer Device, completed assembly of a Russian cargo crane called Strela, and replaced one of Unity's two early communication antennas. | | | |
| 184. | STS-106; EVA 1 | (United States) Edward Lu (Russia) Yuri Malenchenko | September 11, 2000; 04:47 | September 11, 2000; 11:01 | 6 h, 14 min |
| 184. | STS-106; EVA 1 | Lu and Malenchenko attached cabling that fully integrated the Zvezda module to the rest of the ISS, and constructed and attached a magnetometer that serves as a backup navigation system for the station. | | | |
| 185. | STS-92; EVA 1 | (United States) Leroy Chiao (United States) William McArthur | October 15, 2000; 14:27 | October 15, 2000; 20:55 | 6 h, 28 min |
| 185. | STS-92; EVA 1 | Chiao and McArthur connected two sets of cables to provide power to heaters and conduits located on the Z1 truss, relocated two communication antenna assemblies, and installed a toolbox for use during future on-orbit construction. | | | |
| 186. | STS-92; EVA 2 | (United States) Michael Lopez-Alegria (United States) Peter Wisoff | October 16, 2000; 14:15 | October 16, 2000; 21:22 | 7 h, 07 min |
| 186. | STS-92; EVA 2 | Lopez-Alegria and Wisoff installed the Pressurized Mating Adapter (PMA)-3 docking port, and prepared the Z1 truss for the installation of the solar arrays. | | | |
| 187. | STS-92; EVA 3 | (United States) Leroy Chiao (United States) William McArthur | October 17, 2000; 14:30 | October 17, 2000; 21:18 | 6 h, 48 min |
| 187. | STS-92; EVA 3 | Chiao and McArthur installed two DC-to-DC converter units atop the station's Z1 truss. They also reconfigured cabling to new docking port PMA-3, and installed a tool storage box on the Z1 truss. | | | |
| 188. | STS-92; EVA 4 | (United States) Michael Lopez-Alegria (United States) Peter Wisoff | October 18, 2000; 15:00 | October 18, 2000; 21:56 | 6 h, 56 min |
| 188. | STS-92; EVA 4 | Lopez-Alegria and Wisoff removed a grapple fixture on the Z1 truss, deployed a Z1 utility tray, Manual Berthing Mechanism latches for Z1 were cycled and opened, and demonstrated the SAFER pack's abilities. | | | |
| 189. | STS-97; EVA 1 | (United States) Joseph Tanner (United States) Carlos I. Noriega | December 3, 2000; 18:35 | December 4, 2000; 02:08 | 7 h, 33 min |
| 189. | STS-97; EVA 1 | Tanner and Noriega attached the P6 truss to the Z1 truss and prepared the solar arrays for deployment. They also prepared the radiator for the power system deployment. | | | |
| 190. | STS-97; EVA 2 | (United States) Joseph Tanner (United States) Carlos Noriega | December 5, 2000; 17:21 | December 5, 2000; 23:58 | 6 h, 37 min |
| 190. | STS-97; EVA 2 | Tanner and Noriega configured the station to use power from the P6 truss solar array and positioned the S-band antenna for use by the station. They also prepared the station for the arrival of the U.S. laboratory, Destiny. | | | |
| 191. | STS-97; EVA 3 | (United States) Joseph Tanner (United States) Carlos Noriega | December 7, 2000; 16:13 | December 7, 2000; 21:23 | 5 h, 10 min |
| 191. | STS-97; EVA 3 | Tanner and Noriega positioned a floating potential probe to measure the plasma field surrounding the station, performed repair work to increase tension in the starboard solar array blankets that did not stretch out completely during deployment, and installed a centerline camera cable outside the Unity node. | | | |

=== 2001 spacewalks ===
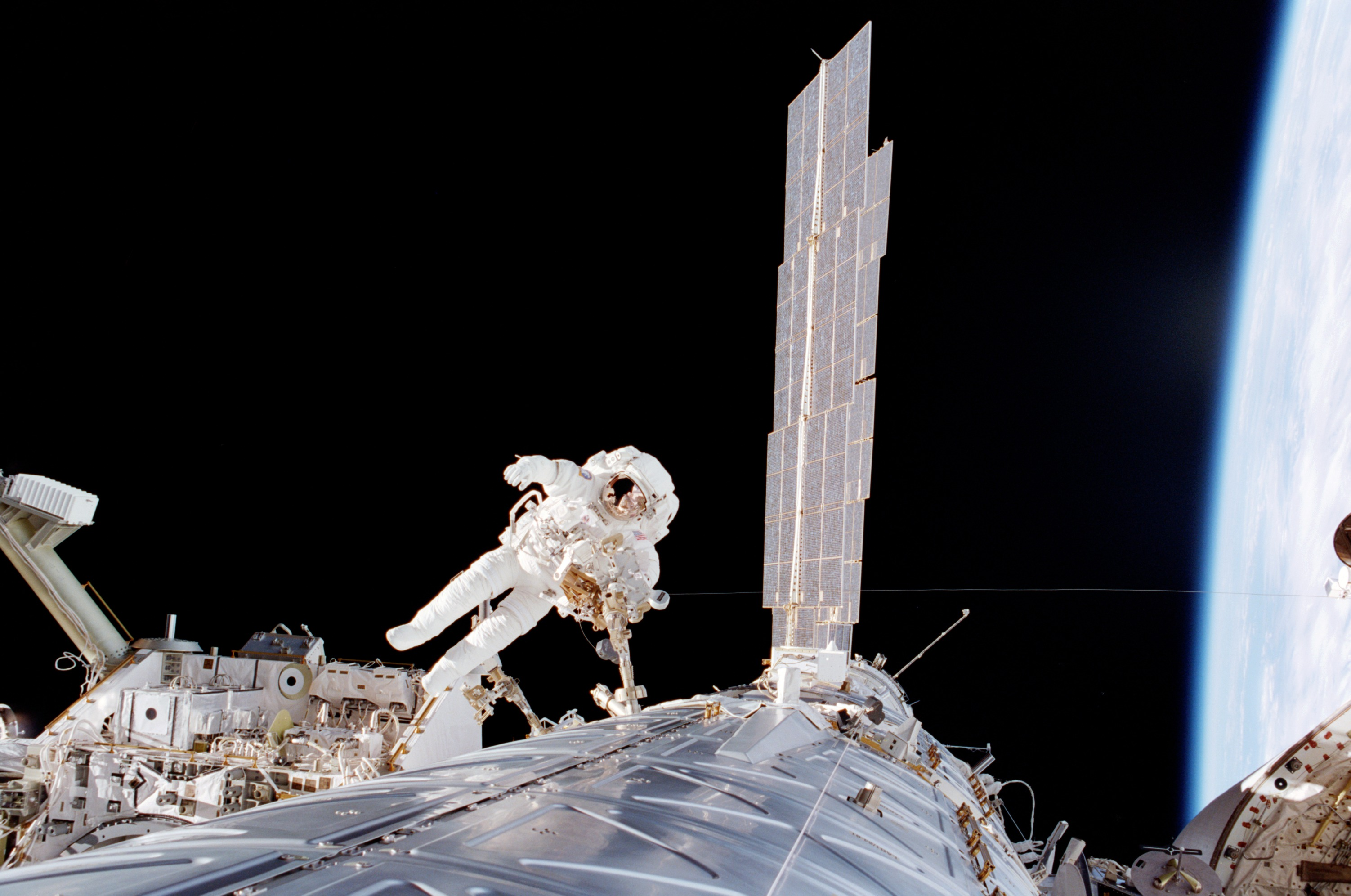
Robert Curbeam on an EVA to install the Destiny science module onto the ISS during STS-98

| # | Spacecraft | Spacewalkers | Start (UTC) | End (UTC) | Duration |
|---|---|---|---|---|---|
| 192. | STS-98; EVA 1 | (United States) Thomas Jones (United States) Robert Curbeam | February 10, 2001; 15:50 | February 10, 2001; 23:24 | 7 h, 34 min |
| 192. | STS-98; EVA 1 | Jones and Curbeam removed protective launch covers and disconnected power and cooling cables between Destiny and Atlantis, while crewmembers inside the shuttle moved the 3,800-cubic-foot (110 m^{3}) laboratory from the payload bay to its home on the Unity node. Curbeam and Jones then connected electrical, data and cooling lines to the lab, during which a small amount of ammonia crystals leaked from one of the hoses, prompting a decontamination procedure. | | | |
| 193. | STS-98; EVA 2 | (United States) Thomas Jones (United States) Robert Curbeam | February 12, 2001; 15:59 | February 12, 2001; 22:49 | 6 h, 50 min |
| 193. | STS-98; EVA 2 | 100th U.S. EVA. Jones and Curbeam installed the shuttle docking adapter onto Destiny, installed insulating covers over the pins that held Destiny in place during launch, attached a vent to the lab's air system, installed handrails and sockets on the exterior of Destiny, and attached a base for Canadarm2. | | | |
| 194. | STS-98; EVA 3 | (United States) Thomas Jones (United States) Robert Curbeam | February 14, 2001; 14:48 | February 14, 2001; 20:13 | 5 h, 25 min |
| 194. | STS-98; EVA 3 | Jones and Curbeam attached a spare communications antenna to the station's exterior, double-checked connections between the Destiny lab and its docking port, released the restraints on a station cooling radiator, inspected solar array connections at the top of the station, and tested a technique for a spacewalker to carry an incapacitated crew member to the shuttle airlock. | | | |
| 195. | STS-102; EVA 1 | (United States) James Voss (United States) Susan Helms | March 11, 2001; 05:12 | March 11, 2001; 14:08 | 8 h, 56 min |
| 195. | STS-102; EVA 1 | Voss and Helms prepared Pressurized Mating Adapter-3 for repositioning from Unity's Earth-facing berth to the port-side berth to make room for Leonardo, the Italian Space Agency–built Multi-Purpose Logistics Module. They also removed a Lab Cradle Assembly from Discovery's payload bay and installed it on the side of Destiny, and installed a cable tray to Destiny for later use by the station's robot arm (Canadarm2). After re-entering the shuttle's airlock, Voss and Helms remained ready to assist if any troubles installing the docking port were encountered by the crew inside the shuttle. This was the longest space walk in shuttle history. | | | |
| 196. | STS-102; EVA 2 | (United States) Andy Thomas (United States) Paul W. Richards | March 13, 2001; 05:23 | March 13, 2001; 11:44 | 6 h, 21 min |
| 196. | STS-102; EVA 2 | Thomas and Richards installed an External Stowage Platform for spare station parts, attached a spare ammonia coolant pump to the platform, and finished connecting several cables put in place on the first EVA for the station's robotic arm. They also inspected a Unity node heater connection, and inspected an exterior experiment, the Floating Potential Probe. | | | |
| 197. | STS-100; EVA 1 | (Canada) Chris Hadfield (United States) Scott Parazynski | April 22, 2001; 11:45 | April 22, 2001; 18:55 | 7 h, 10 min |
| 197. | STS-100; EVA 1 | Hadfield and Parazynski installed the station's UHF antenna, and the Canadian Space Agency–made Canadarm2. They connected cables to give the arm power and allow it to accept computer commands from inside the Destiny lab. Hadfield became the first Canadian spacewalker. | | | |
| 198. | STS-100; EVA 2 | (Canada) Chris Hadfield (United States) Scott Parazynski | April 24, 2001; 12:34 | April 24, 2001; 20:14 | 7 h, 40 min |
| 198. | STS-100; EVA 2 | Hadfield and Parazynski connected the Power Data Grapple Fixture circuits for Canadarm2 onto Destiny, removed an early communications antenna, transferred a spare Direct Current Switching Unit from Atlantis's payload bay to an equipment storage rack on the outside of Destiny. | | | |
| 199. | ISS Expedition 2 EVA 1 | (Russia) Yury Usachov (United States) James Voss | June 8, 2001; 14:21 | June 8, 2001; 14:40 | 0 h, 19 min |
| 199. | ISS Expedition 2 EVA 1 | Usachov and Voss installed the docking cone onto the Zarya module, in preparation for the arrival of the Russian Pirs docking compartment. To date, this is the only EVA to be conducted from the transfer compartment at the forward end of the Zvezda Service Module. | | | |
| 200. | STS-104; EVA 1 | (United States) Michael Gernhardt (United States) James Reilly | July 15, 2001; 03:10 | July 15, 2001; 09:09 | 5 h, 59 min |
| 200. | STS-104; EVA 1 | Gernhardt and Reilly installed the Quest Joint Airlock onto the Unity node and connected power cables to it. | | | |
| 201. | STS-104; EVA 2 | (United States) Michael Gernhardt (United States) James Reilly | July 18, 2001; 03:04 | July 18, 2001; 09:33 | 6 h, 29 min |
| 201. | STS-104; EVA 2 | Gernhardt and Reilly installed one of two high-pressure nitrogen tanks, and one of two high-pressure oxygen tanks onto Quest, and installed grapple fixture and trunnion covers. | | | |
| 202. | STS-104; EVA 3 | (United States) Michael Gernhardt (United States) James Reilly | July 21, 2001; 04:35 | July 21, 2001; 08:37 | 4 h, 02 min |
| 202. | STS-104; EVA 3 | This was the first EVA conducted from the Quest airlock. Gernhardt and Reilly installed the second high-pressure nitrogen tank, and the second oxygen tank onto the Quest airlock. After completion of the tank installation, Gernhardt and Reilly conducted a photography session around the new airlock. | | | |
| 203. | STS-105; EVA 1 | (United States) Daniel Barry (United States) Patrick Forrester | August 16, 2001; 13:58 | August 16, 2001; 20:14 | 6 h, 16 min |
| 203. | STS-105; EVA 1 | Barry and Forrester installed an Early Ammonia Servicer onto the station's P6 truss, stowed a foot restraint, and installed the Materials International Space Station Experiment (MISSE)-1 and 2 containers onto the Quest airlock. | | | |
| 204. | STS-105; EVA 2 | (United States) Daniel Barry (United States) Patrick Forrester | August 18, 2001; 13:42 | August 18, 2001; 19:11 | 5 h, 29 min |
| 204. | STS-105; EVA 2 | Barry and Forrester installed heater cables and handrails onto the station's Destiny laboratory. | | | |
| 205. | ISS Expedition 3 EVA 1 | (Russia) Vladimir Dezhurov (Russia) Mikhail Tyurin | October 8, 2001; 14:24 | October 8, 2001; 19:22 | 4 h, 58 min |
| 205. | ISS Expedition 3 EVA 1 | Dezhurov and Tyurin installed cables between the Pirs module and the Zvezda module to allow spacewalk radio communications between the two sections. The cosmonauts installed handrails onto Pirs, and installed an exterior ladder to assist spacewalkers leaving Pirs. They also installed a Strela cargo crane. | | | |
| 206. | ISS Expedition 3 EVA 2 | (Russia) Vladimir Dezhurov (Russia) Mikhail Tyurin | October 15, 2001; 09:17 | October 15, 2001; 15:08 | 5 h, 51 min |
| 206. | ISS Expedition 3 EVA 2 | Dezhurov and Tyurin installed Russian commercial experiments (MPAC-SEEDS) onto the exterior of the Pirs docking compartment. | | | |
| 207. | ISS Expedition 3 EVA 3 | (Russia) Vladimir Dezhurov, (United States) Frank Culbertson | November 12, 2001; 21:41 | November 13, 2001; 02:46 | 5 h, 05 min |
| 207. | ISS Expedition 3 EVA 3 | Dezhurov and Culbertson connected cables on the exterior of Pirs for the Kurs automated docking system, completed checks of the Strela cargo crane, and inspected and photographed a panel of a solar array on Zvezda that had a portion of a panel not fully unfolded. | | | |
| 208. | ISS Expedition 3 EVA 4 | (Russia) Vladimir Dezhurov (Russia) Mikhail Tyurin | December 3, 2001; 13:20 | December 3, 2001; 16:06 | 2 h, 46 min |
| 208. | ISS Expedition 3 EVA 4 | Dezhurov and Tyurin removed an obstruction that prevented a Progress resupply ship from firmly docking with the station, and took pictures of the debris and of the docking interface. | | | |
| 209. | STS-108; EVA 1 | (United States) Linda Godwin (United States) Daniel Tani | December 10, 2001; 17:52 | December 10, 2001; 22:04 | 4 h, 12 min |
| 209. | STS-108; EVA 1 | Godwin and Tani installed insulating blankets around two Beta Gimbal Assemblies that rotate the station's solar array wings, and performed tasks in preparation for STS-110's spacewalks. | | | |

=== 2002 spacewalks ===
| # | Spacecraft | Spacewalkers | Start (UTC) | End (UTC) | Duration |
|---|---|---|---|---|---|
| 210. | ISS Expedition 4 EVA 1 | (Russia) Yuri Onufriyenko (United States) Carl Walz | January 14, 2002; 20:59 | January 15, 2002; 03:02 | 6 h, 03 min |
| 210. | ISS Expedition 4 EVA 1 | Onufriyenko and Walz moved the cargo boom for the Russian Strela crane from PMA-1 to the exterior of the Pirs docking compartment and installed an amateur radio antenna onto the end of Zvezda. | | | |
| 211. | ISS Expedition 4 EVA 2 | (Russia) Yuri Onufriyenko (United States) Daniel Bursch | January 25, 2002; 15:19 | January 25, 2002; 21:18 | 5 h, 59 min |
| 211. | ISS Expedition 4 EVA 2 | Onufriyenko and Bursch installed six deflector shields for Zvezda's jet thrusters, installed a second amateur radio antenna, attached four science experiments, and retrieved and replaced a device to measure material from the thrusters. | | | |
| 212. | ISS Expedition 4 EVA 3 | (United States) Carl Walz (United States) Daniel Bursch | February 20, 2002; 11:38 | February 20, 2002; 17:25 | 5 h, 47 min |
| 212. | ISS Expedition 4 EVA 3 | Walz and Bursch tested the Quest airlock, and prepared it for the four spacewalks to be performed during STS-110. This was the first spacewalk to be based out of Quest without a Space Shuttle docked at the station. | | | |
| 213. | STS-109; EVA 1 | (United States) John Grunsfeld (United States) Richard Linnehan | March 4, 2002; 06:37 | March 4, 2002; 13:38 | 7 h, 01 min |
| 213. | STS-109; EVA 1 | Grunsfeld and Linnehan removed the old starboard solar array on the Hubble Space Telescope and replaced it with a new, smaller and more powerful third generation solar array. The old array was stowed in Columbia's payload bay for return to Earth. | | | |
| 214. | STS-109; EVA 2 | (United States) Jim Newman (United States) Michael Massimino | March 5, 2002; 06:40 | March 5, 2002; 13:56 | 7 h, 16 min |
| 214. | STS-109; EVA 2 | Newman and Massimino removed the old port solar array on the Hubble Space Telescope and replaced it with a new third generation solar array. The old array was stowed in Columbia's payload bay for return to Earth. The two astronauts then removed and replaced the Reaction Wheel Assembly (RWA). | | | |
| 215. | STS-109; EVA 3 | (United States) John Grunsfeld (United States) Richard Linnehan | March 6, 2002; 08:28 | March 6, 2002; 15:16 | 6 h, 48 min |
| 215. | STS-109; EVA 3 | The spacewalk was delayed two hours by a water leak in Grunsfeld's spacesuit. The old Power Control Unit (PCU) was removed from Hubble and stowed for return to Earth. A new, more powerful PCU, sized to match the more productive solar arrays, was installed. | | | |
| 216. | STS-109; EVA 4 | (United States) Jim Newman (United States) Michael Massimino | March 7, 2002; 09:00 | March 7, 2002; 16:30 | 7 h, 30 min |
| 216. | STS-109; EVA 4 | Newman and Massimino removed the Faint Object Camera from the aft shroud of Hubble and installed the Advanced Camera for Surveys (ACS) in the same location. After stowing the Faint Object Camera in Columbia for return to Earth, the Electronic Support Module was installed in the aft shroud. | | | |
| 217. | STS-109; EVA 5 | (United States) John Grunsfeld (United States) Richard Linnehan | March 8, 2002; 08:46 | March 8, 2002; 16:06 | 7 h, 20 min |
| 217. | STS-109; EVA 5 | Linnehan and Grunsfeld installed an experimental cryocooler for NICMOS inside the aft shroud of Hubble and connected it to the Electronic Support Module installed the day before. Then the two spacewalkers installed the Cooling System Radiator to the outside of Hubble, and connected it to the NICMOS. | | | |
| 218. | STS-110; EVA 1 | (United States) Steven Smith (United States) Rex Walheim | April 11, 2002; 14:36 | April 11, 2002; 22:24 | 7 h, 48 min |
| 218. | STS-110; EVA 1 | Smith and Walheim began installing the S0 truss onto Destiny by setting up initial power and data connections between the station and the truss, and installing two forward struts that permanently held the truss in place. | | | |
| 219. | STS-110; EVA 2 | (United States) Jerry Ross (United States) Lee Morin | April 13, 2002; 14:09 | April 13, 2002; 21:39 | 7 h, 30 min |
| 219. | STS-110; EVA 2 | Ross and Morin continued the installation of the S0 truss, installing power and data cable connections between the truss and the station, and two aft struts that permanently held the truss in place. | | | |
| 220. | STS-110; EVA 3 | (United States) Steven Smith (United States) Rex Walheim | April 14, 2002; 13:48 | April 14, 2002; 20:15 | 6 h, 27 min |
| 220. | STS-110; EVA 3 | Smith and Walheim released the claw that was used in the initial attachment of the S0 truss, installed connectors used to route power to Canadarm2 when it is on the truss, released launch restraints from the Mobile Transporter, and removed a small thermal cover the Mobile Transporter's radiator. | | | |
| 221. | STS-110; EVA 4 | (United States) Jerry Ross (United States) Lee Morin | April 16, 2002; 14:29 | April 16, 2002; 21:06 | 6 h, 37 min |
| 221. | STS-110; EVA 4 | Ross and Morin pivoted the "Airlock Spur", which is currently used by spacewalkers as a path from the Quest airlock to the truss, installed handrails onto S0, partially assembled a platform, and installed two floodlights. | | | |
| 222. | STS-111; EVA 1 | (United States) Franklin Chang-Diaz (France) Philippe Perrin | June 9, 2002; 15:27 | June 9, 2002; 22:41 | 7 h, 14 min |
| 222. | STS-111; EVA 1 | Chang-Diaz and Perrin attached a Power Data Grapple Fixture to the P6 truss, removed debris panels from Endeavour's payload bay and attached them to a temporary location on PMA-1, and removed thermal blankets to prepare the Mobile Base System (MBS) for installation onto the station's Mobile Transporter. | | | |
| 223. | STS-111; EVA 2 | (United States) Franklin Chang-Diaz (France) Philippe Perrin | June 11, 2002; 15:27 | June 11, 2002; 22:41 | 7 h, 14 min |
| 223. | STS-111; EVA 2 | Chang-Diaz and Perrin attached the Mobile Base System to the Mobile Transporter, and attached power, data and video cables from the station to the MBS. | | | |
| 224. | STS-111; EVA 3 | (United States) Franklin Chang-Diaz (France) Philippe Perrin | June 13, 2002; 15:16 | June 13, 2002; 22:33 | 7 h, 17 min |
| 224. | STS-111; EVA 3 | Chang-Diaz and Perrin replaced Canadarm2's wrist roll joint, and stowed the old joint in Endeavour's payload bay to be returned to Earth. | | | |
| 225. | ISS Expedition 5 EVA 1 | (Russia) Valery Korzun (United States) Peggy Whitson | August 16, 2002; 09:25 | August 16, 2002; 1348 | 4 h, 23 min |
| 225. | ISS Expedition 5 EVA 1 | Korzun and Whitson installed six micrometeoroid debris panels onto Zvezda. These panels were the first six of 23 panels that were installed to add more micrometeoroid protection to Zvezda. | | | |
| 226. | ISS Expedition 5 EVA 2 | (Russia) Valery Korzun (Russia) Sergei Treshchev | August 26, 2002; 05:27 | August 26, 2002; 10:48 | 5 h, 21 min |
| 226. | ISS Expedition 5 EVA 2 | Korzun and Treshchev installed a frame on the outside of Zarya for spacewalk assembly tasks, installed new samples on a pair of Japanese Space Agency experiments housed on Zvezda, installed devices on Zvezda that would simplify the routing of tethers during future spacewalks, and installed two additional amateur radio antennas on Zvezda. | | | |
| 227. | STS-112; EVA 1 | (United States) David Wolf (United States) Piers Sellers | October 10, 2002; 15:21 | October 10, 2002; 22:22 | 7 h, 01 min |
| 227. | STS-112; EVA 1 | Wolf and Sellers released launch locks that held the S1 truss radiators in place during launch, attached power, data and fluid lines between the S1 truss and S0 truss, deployed the station's second S-Band communications system, installed the first of two external camera systems, and released launch restraints on the truss's mobile spacewalk workstation, the Crew and Equipment Translation Aid (CETA). | | | |
| 228. | STS-112; EVA 2 | (United States) David Wolf (United States) Piers Sellers | October 12, 2002; 14:31 | October 12, 2002; 20:35 | 6 h, 04 min |
| 228. | STS-112; EVA 2 | Wolf and Sellers installed a second camera system, released more radiator launch locks, removed insulation covers on quick-disconnect fittings near the Z1 and P6 junction, installed Spool Positioning Devices, released starboard-side launch restraints on the CETA cart, and attached Ammonia Tank Assembly cables. | | | |
| 229. | STS-112; EVA 3 | (United States) David Wolf (United States) Piers Sellers | October 14, 2002; 14:08 | October 14, 2002; 20:44 | 6 h, 36 min |
| 229. | STS-112; EVA 3 | Wolf and Sellers removed and replaced the Interface Umbilical Assembly on the station's Mobile Transporter, installed two jumpers allowing for ammonia coolant to flow between the S1 and S0 trusses, released a drag link and stowed it, and installed Spool Positioning Devices (SPD) on ammonia lines. | | | |
| 230. | STS-113; EVA 1 | (United States) Michael Lopez-Alegria (United States) John Herrington | November 26, 2002; 19:49 | November 27, 2002; 02:34 | 6 h, 45 min |
| 230. | STS-113; EVA 1 | Lopez-Alegria and Herrington began the initial installation of the P1 truss by installing connections between the P1 and the S0 truss, releasing launch restraints on the CETA cart, installing Spool Positioning Devices (SPDs) onto the station, and removing a drag link on P1 that served as a launch restraint. They also installed a wireless video system External Transceiver Assembly onto the Unity node. | | | |
| 231. | STS-113; EVA 2 | (United States) Michael Lopez-Alegria (United States) John Herrington | November 28, 2002; 18:36 | November 29, 2002; 00:46 | 6 h, 10 min |
| 231. | STS-113; EVA 2 | Lopez-Alegria and Herrington installed fluid jumpers where the S0 and the P1 are attached to each other, removed the P1's starboard keel pin, installed another wireless video system External Transceiver Assembly onto the P1, and relocated the CETA cart from the P1 to the S1 truss. | | | |
| 232. | STS-113; EVA 3 | (United States) Michael Lopez-Alegria (United States) John Herrington | November 30, 2002; 19:25 | December 1, 2002; 02:25 | 7 h, 00 min |
| 232. | STS-113; EVA 3 | Herrington successfully troubleshot a mobility issue with the CETA cart. Lopez-Alegria and Herrington then completed the planned EVA activities by installing more Spool Positioning Devices, reconfiguring electrical harnesses that route power through the Main Bus Switching Units, and attaching Ammonia Tank Assembly lines. | | | |

=== 2003 spacewalks ===
| # | Spacecraft | Spacewalkers | Start (UTC) | End (UTC) | Duration |
|---|---|---|---|---|---|
| 233. | ISS Expedition 6 EVA 1 | (United States) Kenneth Bowersox (United States) Donald Pettit | January 15, 2003; 12:50 | January 15, 2003; 19:41 | 6 h, 51 min |
| 233. | ISS Expedition 6 EVA 1 | Bowersox and Pettit released the remaining launch locks on the P1 radiator assembly, removed debris on a sealing ring of Unity's docking port, and tested an ammonia reservoir on the station's P6 truss. | | | |
| 234. | ISS Expedition 6 EVA 2 | (United States) Kenneth Bowersox (United States) Donald Pettit | April 8, 2003; 12:40 | April 8, 2003; 19:06 | 6 h, 26 min |
| 234. | ISS Expedition 6 EVA 2 | Bowersox and Pettit reconfigured cables on the S0, S1 and P1 trusses, replaced a Power Control Module on the Mobile Transporter, installed Spool Positioning Devices on Destiny, and reinstalled a thermal cover on an S1 Radiator Beam Valve Module. | | | |

=== 2004 spacewalks ===
| # | Spacecraft | Spacewalkers | Start (UTC) | End (UTC) | Duration |
|---|---|---|---|---|---|
| 235. | ISS Expedition 8 EVA 1 | (United States) Michael Foale (Russia) Alexander Kaleri | February 26, 2004; 21:17 | February 27, 2004; 01:12 | 3 h, 55 min |
| 235. | ISS Expedition 8 EVA 1 | Foale and Kaleri replaced cassette containers that held sample materials for a microgravity experiment, attached the Russian experiment Matryoshka to Zvezda, and removed a JAXA micrometeoroid impact experiment. The spacewalk was cut short due to a cooling system malfunction in Kaleri's spacesuit. | | | |
| 236. | ISS Expedition 9 EVA 1 | (Russia) Gennady Padalka (United States) Michael Fincke | June 24, 2004; 21:57 | June 24, 2004; 22:10 | 0 h, 13 min |
| 236. | ISS Expedition 9 EVA 1 | The spacewalk cut short due to a pressure problem in Fincke's prime oxygen tank in his spacesuit. Mission managers decided to reschedule the spacewalk for 30 June. | | | |
| 237. | ISS Expedition 9 EVA 2 | (Russia) Gennady Padalka (United States) Michael Fincke | June 30, 2004; 21:19 | July 1, 2004; 02:59 | 5 h, 40 min |
| 237. | ISS Expedition 9 EVA 2 | Padalka and Fincke replaced a Remote Power Controller (RPC) that failed in late April, causing a loss of power in Control Moment Gyroscope 2 (CMG 2). This spacewalk was the first time that primary Mission Control was transitioned from Moscow to Houston during an EVA. | | | |
| 238. | ISS Expedition 9 EVA 3 | (Russia) Gennady Padalka (United States) Michael Fincke | August 3, 2004; 06:58 | August 3, 2004; 11:28 | 4 h, 30 min |
| 238. | ISS Expedition 9 EVA 3 | Padalka and Fincke removed laser retro reflectors from the Zvezda assembly compartment, and installed three updated laser retro reflectors and one internal videometer target in preparation for the Automated Transfer Vehicle (ATV). They also installed two antennas, and removed and replaced Kromka experiment packages. | | | |
| 239. | ISS Expedition 9 EVA 4 | (Russia) Gennady Padalka (United States) Michael Fincke | September 3, 2004; 16:43 | September 3, 2004; 22:04 | 5 h, 21 min |
| 239. | ISS Expedition 9 EVA 4 | Padalka and Fincke continued preparations for the arrival of the European Space Agency's Automatic Transfer Vehicle. They replaced the Zarya Control Module flow control panel, installed four safety tether fairleads on Zarya's handrails, installed three communications antennas, and removed covers from the antennas. | | | |

== 2005–2009 spacewalks ==
Spacewalk beginning and ending times are given in Coordinated Universal Time (UTC).

=== 2005 spacewalks ===
| # | Spacecraft | Spacewalkers | Start (UTC) | End (UTC) | Duration |
|---|---|---|---|---|---|
| 240. | ISS Expedition 10; EVA 1 | (United States) Leroy Chiao (Russia) Salizhan Sharipov | January 26, 2005, 07:43 | January 26, 2005, 13:11 | 5 h, 28 min |
| 240. | ISS Expedition 10; EVA 1 | Chiao and Sharipov completed the installation of the Universal Work Platform, mounted the European commercial experiment Rokviss (Robotic Components Verification on ISS) and its antenna, installed the Russian Biorisk experiment, and relocated a Japanese exposure experiment. | | | |
| 241. | ISS Expedition 10; EVA 2 | (United States) Leroy Chiao (Russia) Salizhan Sharipov | March 28, 2005, 06:25 | March 28, 2005, 11:31 | 5 h, 06 min |
| 241. | ISS Expedition 10; EVA 2 | Chiao and Sharipov installed navigational and communications equipment for the arrival of the first Automated Transfer Vehicle (ATV), and deployed an 11-pound Russian Nanosatellite. | | | |
| 242. | STS-114; EVA 1 | (Japan) Soichi Noguchi (United States) Stephen Robinson | July 30, 2005, 05:46 | July 30, 2005, 12:36 | 6 h, 50 min |
| 242. | STS-114; EVA 1 | Noguchi and Robinson demonstrated shuttle thermal protection repair techniques and enhancements to the Station's attitude control system. They also installed a base and cabling for an External Stowage Platform, rerouted power to Control Moment Gyroscope-2 (CMG-2), retrieved two exposure experiments, and replaced a faulty global positioning system antenna on the station. | | | |
| 243. | STS-114; EVA 2 | (Japan) Soichi Noguchi (United States) Stephen Robinson | August 1, 2005, 04:44 | August 1, 2005, 11:58 | 7 h, 14 min |
| 243. | STS-114; EVA 2 | Noguchi and Robinson removed a faulty CMG-1 from the Z1 truss, installed the faulty CMG-1 into Discovery's payload bay, and installed a new CMG-1 on the Z1 truss segment. | | | |
| 244. | STS-114; EVA 3 | (Japan) Soichi Noguchi (United States) Stephen Robinson | August 3, 2005, 04:14 | August 3, 2005, 10:15 | 6 h, 01 min |
| 244. | STS-114; EVA 3 | Noguchi and Robinson photographed and inspected Discovery's heat shield, removed two protruding gap fillers from between tiles in the forward area of the orbiter's underside, and installed the amateur radio satellite PCSAT2. | | | |
| 245. | ISS Expedition 11; EVA 1 | (Russia) Sergei Krikalev (United States) John L. Phillips | August 18, 2005, 19:02 | August 19, 2005, 00:00 | 4 h, 58 min |
| 245. | ISS Expedition 11; EVA 1 | Krikalev and Phillips retrieved one of three canisters from the Biorisk experiment, removed the Micro-Particles Capturer experiment and Space Environment Exposure Device from Zvezda, retrieved the Matroska experiment, and installed an Automated Transfer Vehicle (ATV) docking television camera. | | | |
| 246. | ISS Expedition 12; EVA 1 | (United States) William McArthur (Russia) Valery Tokarev | November 7, 2005, 15:32 | November 7, 2005, 20:54 | 5 h, 22 min |
| 246. | ISS Expedition 12; EVA 1 | McArthur and Tokarev installed and set up the P1 Truss camera, retrieved a failed Rotary Joint Motor Controller (RJMC), jettisoned a Floating Potential Probe, and removed and replaced a remote power controller module on the Mobile Transporter. This was the first Quest airlock-based spacewalk since April 2003. | | | |

=== 2006 spacewalks ===
| # | Spacecraft | Spacewalkers | Start (UTC) | End (UTC) | Duration |
|---|---|---|---|---|---|
| 247. | ISS Expedition 12; EVA 2 | (United States) William McArthur (Russia) Valery Tokarev | February 3, 2006, 9:55 | February 3, 2006, 16:27 | 5 h, 43 min |
| 247. | ISS Expedition 12; EVA 2 | McArthur and Tokarev released SuitSat-1, retrieved the Biorisk experiment, photographed a sensor for a micrometeoroid experiment, relocated an adapter for a small crane, and tied off the surviving umbilical of the Mobile Transporter. | | | |
| 248. | ISS Expedition 13; EVA 1 | (Russia) Pavel Vinogradov (United States) Jeffrey Williams | June 1, 2006; 23:48 | June 2, 2006; 06:19 | 6 h, 31 min |
| 248. | ISS Expedition 13; EVA 1 | Vinogradov and Williams repaired a vent for the station's oxygen-producing Elektron unit, retrieved a Biorisk experiment, retrieved a contamination-monitoring device from Zvezda, and replaced a malfunctioning camera on the Mobile Base System. | | | |
| 249. | STS-121; EVA 1 | (United States) Piers Sellers (United States) Michael E. Fossum | July 8, 2006; 13:17 | July 8, 2006; 20:48 | 7 h, 31 min |
| 249. | STS-121; EVA 1 | Sellers and Foale installed a blade blocker in the zenith Interface Umbilical Assembly (IUA) to protect the undamaged power, data and video cable, and rerouted the cable to prepare for the second EVA. They also tested the combination of the Shuttle's Canadarm(SRMS) and the Orbiter Boom Sensor System (OBSS) as a platform for astronauts to make repairs to a damaged orbiter. | | | |
| 250. | STS-121; EVA 2 | (United States) Piers Sellers (United States) Michael E. Fossum | July 10, 2006; 7:14 | July 10, 2006; 14:01 | 6 h, 47 min |
| 250. | STS-121; EVA 2 | Sellers and Fossum restored the International Space Station's Mobile Transporter rail car to full operation, and delivered a spare pump module for the station's cooling system. Sellers' SAFER pack came loose during the EVA, requiring Fossum to stop twice during the spacewalk to secure the pack with safety tethers. | | | |
| 251. | STS-121; EVA 3 | (United States) Piers Sellers (United States) Michael E. Fossum | July 12, 2006; 6:20 | July 12, 2006; 13:31 | 7 h, 11 min |
| 251. | STS-121; EVA 3 | Sellers and Fossum used an infrared camera to shoot 20 seconds of video of selected reinforced carbon-carbon (RCC) panels on the shuttle wing's leading edge, and then moved to the payload bay to test a shuttle tile repair material known as NOAX on pre-damaged shuttle tiles that were flown in a test container. | | | |
| 252. | ISS Expedition 13; EVA 2 | (United States) Jeffrey Williams (Germany) Thomas Reiter | August 3, 2006; 14:04 | August 3, 2006; 19:58 | 5 h, 54 min |
| 252. | ISS Expedition 13; EVA 2 | Williams and Reiter installed the Floating Potential Measurement Unit (FPMU), two materials on Materials International Space Station Experiment (MISSE) containers, a controller for a thermal radiator rotary joint on the S1 truss, a starboard jumper and spool positioning device (SPD) on S1, a light on the truss railway handcart, and installed and replaced a malfunctioning GPS antenna. They then tested an infrared camera designed to detect damage in a shuttle's reinforced carbon-carbon (RCC) thermal protection tiles. Inspection and photography of a scratch on the Quest airlock hatch completed the EVA. | | | |
| 253. | STS-115; EVA 1 | (United States) Joe Tanner (United States) Heidemarie Stefanyshyn-Piper | September 12, 2006; 10:17 | September 12, 2006; 15:43 | 5 h, 26 min |
| 253. | STS-115; EVA 1 | Tanner and Stefanyshyn-Piper completed initial installation of the P3/P4 truss onto the space station. They connected the power cables on the truss, and released the launch restraints on the solar array blanket box, the Beta Gimbal Assembly, and the solar array wings. They also configured the Solar Alpha Rotary Joint (SARJ), and removed two circuit interrupt devices to prepare for STS-116. Stefanyshyn-Piper became the seventh American woman to walk in space. | | | |
| 254. | STS-115; EVA 2 | (United States) Dan Burbank (Canada) Steven MacLean | September 13, 2006; 9:05 | September 13, 2006; 16:16 | 7 h, 11 min |
| 254. | STS-115; EVA 2 | Burbank and MacLean continued installation of the P3/4 truss onto the station, and activated the SARJ. | | | |
| 255. | STS-115; EVA 3 | (United States) Joe Tanner (United States) Heidemarie Stefanyshyn-Piper | September 15, 2006; 10:00 | September 15, 2006; 16:42 | 6 h, 42 min |
| 255. | STS-115; EVA 3 | Tanner and Stefanyshyn-Piper installed a radiator onto the P3/4 truss, powered up a cooling radiator for the new solar arrays, replaced an S-Band radio antenna, and installed insulation for another antenna. Tanner took photos of the shuttle's wings using an infrared camera to test the camera's ability to detect damage. | | | |
| 256. | Expedition 14; EVA 1 | (Russia) Mikhail Tyurin (United States) Michael Lopez-Alegria | November 22, 2006; 23:17 | November 23, 2006; 04:55 | 5 h, 39 min |
| 256. | Expedition 14; EVA 1 | An unusual "Orbiting golf shot" event was sponsored by a Canadian golf company through the Russian Federal Space Agency. López-Alegría put the tee on the ladder outside Pirs, while Tyurin set up a camera and performed the golf shot. López-Alegría and Tyurin inspected and photographed a Kurs antenna on Progress 23, relocated an Automated Transfer Vehicle (ATV) WAL antenna, installed a BTN neutron experiment, and jettisoned two thermal covers from the BTN. | | | |
| 257. | STS-116; EVA 1 | (United States) Robert Curbeam (Sweden) Christer Fuglesang | December 12, 2006; 20:31 | December 13, 2006; 03:07 | 6 h, 36 min |
| 257. | STS-116; EVA 1 | Curbeam and Fuglesang installed the ISS P5 Truss, replaced a broken video camera on the S1 truss, and prepared the new truss for relocation of the P6 truss to its permanent location. | | | |
| 258. | STS-116; EVA 2 | (United States) Robert Curbeam (Sweden) Christer Fuglesang | December 14, 2006; 19:41 | December 15, 2006; 00:41 | 5 h, 00 min |
| 258. | STS-116; EVA 2 | Curbeam and Fuglesang reconfigured the station's electrical wiring, placing electrical channels 2–3 on the P3/P4 truss into service, thus enabling full advantage of the new solar arrays. They then relocated two handcarts that run along rails on the station's main truss, put a thermal cover on the station's robotic arm, and installed tool bags for future spacewalkers. | | | |
| 259. | STS-116; EVA 3 | (United States) Robert Curbeam (United States) Sunita Williams | December 16, 2006; 19:25 | December 17, 2006; 02:57 | 7 h, 31 min |
| 259. | STS-116; EVA 3 | Curbeam and Williams completed rewiring the station's electrical system, activating electrical circuits 1 and 4, preparing for installation of more solar power arrays. They then installed a robotic arm grapple fixture, and positioned three bundles of Russian debris shield panels outside Zvezda. Additional time was spent trying to help retract the P6 solar array panel by shaking the panel's blanket box from its base. | | | |
| 260. | STS-116; EVA 4 | (United States) Robert Curbeam (Sweden) Christer Fuglesang | December 18, 2006; 19:00 | December 19, 2006; 01:38 | 6 h, 38 min |
| 260. | STS-116; EVA 4 | Curbeam and Fuglesang assisted ground controllers with retracting the P6 solar array panels in preparation for moving them during the upcoming flight STS-120. Curbeam, on his seventh spacewalk, set a single-flight EVA record with four spacewalks in a single shuttle mission. | | | |

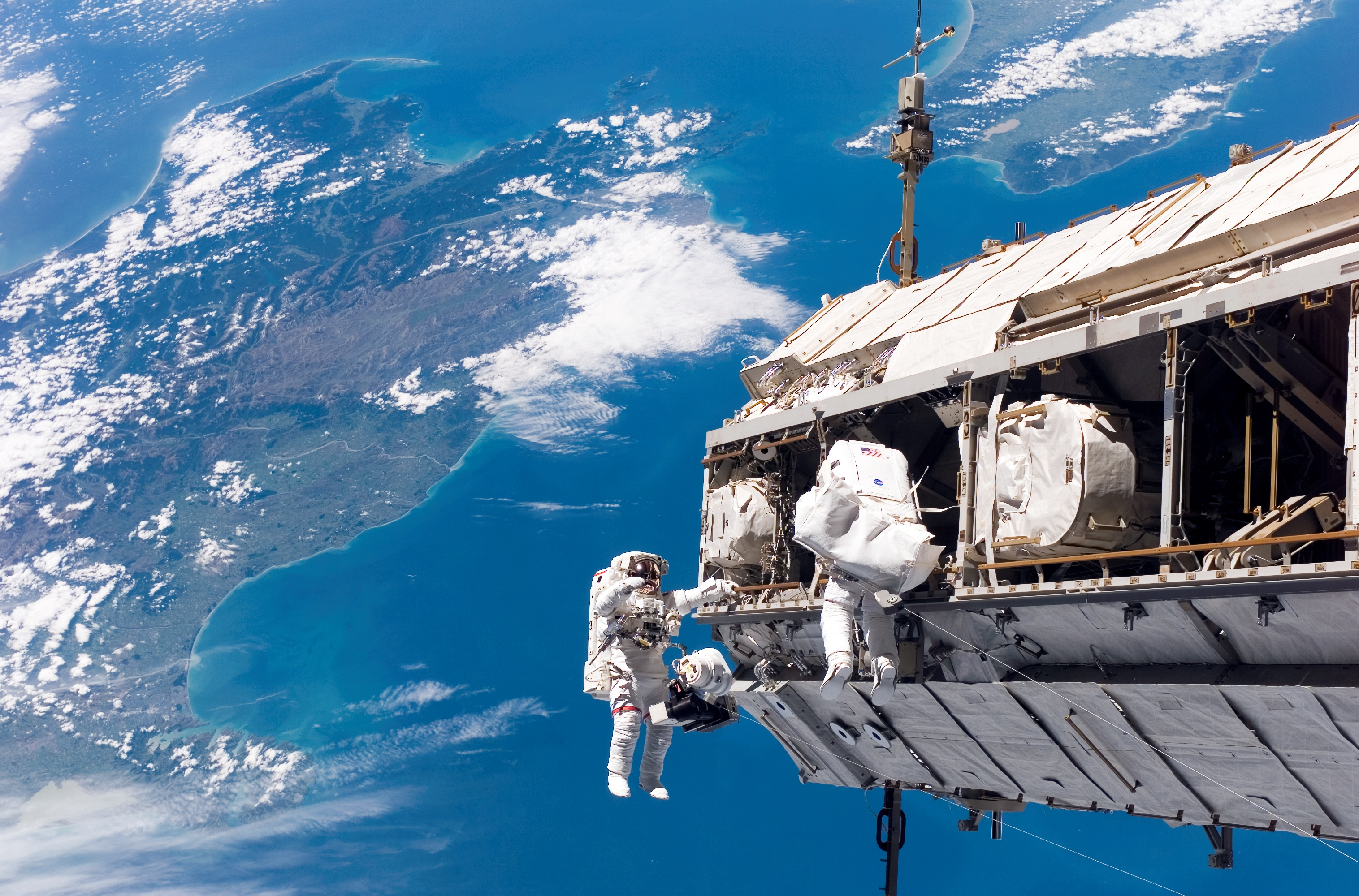
Robert Curbeam and Christer Fuglesang attach cables to the ISS P3/P4 truss during the second EVA of Discovery's STS-116 flight (2006).

=== 2007 spacewalks ===
| # | Spacecraft | Spacewalkers | Start (UTC) | End (UTC) | Duration |
|---|---|---|---|---|---|
| 261. | Expedition 14; EVA 2 | (United States) Michael Lopez-Alegria (United States) Sunita Williams | January 31, 2007; 15:14 | January 31, 2007; 23:09 | 7 h, 55 min |
| 261. | Expedition 14; EVA 2 | López-Alegría and Williams reconfigured one of the two cooling loops serving Destiny from the temporary to permanent system, connected a cable for the Station-to-Shuttle Power Transfer System (SSPTS), installed six cable cinches and two winch bars to secure the starboard radiator of the P6 Truss, and then installed a shroud over it. They then removed one of two fluid lines from the Early Ammonia Servicer (EAS) on the P6 Truss in preparation for jettisoning the EAS on a later EVA. | | | |
| 262. | Expedition 14; EVA 3 | (United States) Michael Lopez-Alegria (United States) Sunita Williams | February 4, 2007; 13:38 | February 4, 2007; 20:49 | 7 h, 11 min |
| 262. | Expedition 14; EVA 3 | López-Alegría and Williams reconfigured the second of the two cooling loops serving Destiny from the temporary to permanent system, completed work with the Early Ammonia Servicer (EAS) on the P6 Truss, photographed the inboard end of the P6 starboard solar wing in preparation for its retraction during STS-117, removed a sunshade from a multiplexer-demultiplexer data relay device, and continued work on the SSPTS. | | | |
| 263. | Expedition 14; EVA 4 | (United States) Michael Lopez-Alegria (United States) Sunita Williams | February 8, 2007; 13:26 | February 8, 2007; 20:06 | 6 h, 40 min |
| 263. | Expedition 14; EVA 4 | López-Alegría and Williams removed two thermal shrouds on two Rotary Joint Motor Controllers (RJMC) on the P3 truss, removed two large shrouds from P3 Bays 18 and 20, and jettisoned the shrouds away from the station. They also deployed an Unpressurized Cargo Carrier Assembly Attachment System (UCCAS) on the upper face of the P3 truss, removed two launch locks from the P5 truss, and connected four cables of the SSPTS to the Pressurized Mating Adapter (PMA-2) at the forward end of Destiny where shuttles dock. | | | |
| 264. | Expedition 14; EVA 5 | (United States) Michael Lopez-Alegria (Russia) Mikhail Tyurin | February 22, 2007; 10:28 | February 22, 2007; 16:45 | 6 h, 18 min |
| 264. | Expedition 14; EVA 5 | López-Alegría and Tyurin retracted the antenna of the Progress cargo carrier at the aft port of the Zvezda service module, photographed a Russian satellite navigation antenna, and replaced a Russian materials experiment. They also inspected and photographed an antenna for the Automated Transfer Vehicle (ATV), photographed a German robotics experiment, and inspected, remated, and photographed hardware connectors. Tyurin experienced some cooling problems and fogging on his visor during the spacewalk. | | | |
| 265. | Expedition 15; EVA 1 | (Russia) Oleg Kotov (Russia) Fyodor Yurchikhin | May 30, 2007; 19:05 | May 31, 2007; 00:30 | 5 h, 25 min |
| 265. | Expedition 15; EVA 1 | Kotov and Yurchikhin installed Service Module Debris Protection (SMDP) panels on Zvezda and rerouted a Global Positioning System antenna cable. | | | |
| 266. | Expedition 15; EVA 2 | (Russia) Oleg Kotov (Russia) Fyodor Yurchikhin | June 6, 2007; 14:23 | June 6, 2007; 20:00 | 5 h, 37 min |
| 266. | Expedition 15; EVA 2 | Kotov and Yurchikhin installed a section of Ethernet cable on the Zarya module, installed additional Service Module Debris Protection (SMDP) panels on Zvezda, and deployed a Russian scientific experiment. | | | |
| 267. | STS-117; EVA 1 | (United States) James F. Reilly (United States) John D. Olivas | June 11, 2007; 20:02 | June 12, 2007; 02:17 | 6 h, 15 min |
| 267. | STS-117; EVA 1 | Reilly and Olivas completed the installation of ISS S3/S4 Truss by attaching bolts, cables, and connectors. They then released the launch restraints on four Solar Array Blanket Boxes in preparation for deployment of the arrays. | | | |
| 268. | STS-117; EVA 2 | (United States) Patrick G. Forrester (United States) Steven Swanson | June 13, 2007; 18:28 | June 14, 2007; 01:44 | 7 h, 16 min |
| 268. | STS-117; EVA 2 | Forrester and Swanson assisted in retraction of the solar panels on the P6 Truss. When Forrester tried to install a drive-lock assembly, a partial failure was discovered. The failure was due to the S3/S4 SARJ motor control circuits being wired in reverse. Some launch restraints were left in place to prevent the possibility of undesired rotation. | | | |
| 269. | STS-117; EVA 3 | (United States) James F. Reilly (United States) John D. Olivas | June 15, 2007; 17:24 | June 16, 2007; 01:22 | 7 h, 58 min |
| 269. | STS-117; EVA 3 | Reilly and Olivas repaired the Orbital Maneuvering System (OMS) pod thermal blanket, finished the P6 solar array retraction, and installed a hydrogen ventilation valve onto Destiny. | | | |
| 270. | STS-117; EVA 4 | (United States) Patrick G. Forrester (United States) Steven Swanson | June 17, 2007; 16:25 | June 17, 2007; 22:54 | 6 h, 29 min |
| 270. | STS-117; EVA 4 | Forrester and Swanson retrieved a television camera and its support structure from an External Stowage Platform attached to the Quest airlock, and installed it on the S3 truss, verified the Drive Lock Assembly (DLA) 2 configuration, and removed the last six SARJ launch restraints. Then they installed a computer network cable on the Unity node, opened the hydrogen vent valve on the Destiny laboratory, and tethered two orbital debris shield panels on the station's service module. | | | |
| 271. | Expedition 15; EVA 3 | (United States) Clayton Anderson (Russia) Fyodor Yurchikhin | July 23, 2007; 10:25 | July 23, 2007; 18:06 | 7 h, 41 min |
| 271. | Expedition 15; EVA 3 | Anderson and Yurchikhin replaced components for the Mobile Transporter's redundant power system, jettisoned an ammonia tank and flight support equipment, and cleaned the Common Berthing Mechanism (CBM) on the nadir port of Unity. | | | |
| 272. | STS-118; EVA 1 | (United States) Richard Mastracchio (Canada) Dafydd Williams | August 11, 2007; 16:28 | August 11, 2007; 22:45 | 6 h, 17 min |
| 272. | STS-118; EVA 1 | Mastracchio and Williams attached the Starboard 5 (S5) segment of the station's truss, and retracted the forward heat-rejecting radiator from the station's Port 6 (P6) truss in preparation for moving the P6 truss to its final location at the end of the port truss. | | | |
| 273. | STS-118; EVA 2 | (United States) Richard Mastracchio (Canada) Dafydd Williams | August 13, 2007; 15:32 | August 13, 2007; 22:00 | 6 h, 28 min |
| 273. | STS-118; EVA 2 | Mastracchio and Williams removed the new Control Moment Gyroscope (CMG) from the shuttle's payload bay and installed it onto the Z1 truss. They then stowed the failed CMG onto an External Stowage Platform (ESP-2) for return to earth in a subsequent shuttle flight. | | | |
| 274. | STS-118; EVA 3 | (United States) Richard Mastracchio (United States) Clayton Anderson | August 15, 2007; 14:37 | August 15, 2007; 20:05 | 5 h, 28 min |
| 274. | STS-118; EVA 3 | Mastracchio and Anderson moved two Crew Equipment Translation Aid (CETA) carts from the tracks on the left side of the Canadarm2 Mobile Transporter to its right side. They also relocated an antenna base from the P6 truss to P1, and installed a new transponder and signal processor for an S-band communications upgrade. During the EVA, Mastracchio noted a hole in the second layer of material on the thumb of his left glove. The suit has five protective layers, and the small hole did not cause any danger to Mastracchio, but he returned to the airlock early as a precautionary measure. | | | |
| 275. | STS-118; EVA 4 | (Canada) Dafydd Williams (United States) Clayton Anderson | August 18, 2007; 14:17 | August 18, 2007; 19:02 | 5 h, 2 min |
| 275. | STS-118; EVA 4 | Williams and Anderson retrieved Materials International Space Station Experiment (MISSE) containers 3 and 4, installed the Orbiter Boom Sensor System (OBSS) Boom Stand, installed an External Wireless Instrumentation System (EWIS) antenna, and secured Z1 gimbal locks. | | | |
| 276. | STS-120; EVA 1 | (United States) Scott Parazynski (United States) Douglas Wheelock | October 26, 2007; 10:02 | October 26, 2007; 16:16 | 6 h, 14 min |
| 276. | STS-120; EVA 1 | Parazynski and Wheelock installed the new Harmony module in its temporary location, retrieved the S-Band Antenna Support Assembly, and prepared for the relocation of the P6 truss by disconnecting fluid lines on the P6/Z1 truss segments. | | | |
| 277. | STS-120; EVA 2 | (United States) Scott Parazynski (United States) Daniel M. Tani | October 28, 2007; 09:32 | October 28, 2007; 16:05 | 6h, 33min |
| 277. | STS-120; EVA 2 | Parazynski and Tani disconnected the Z1-to-P6 umbilicals, detached P6 from Z1, configured the S1 radiator, installed handrails onto Harmony, and inspected the S4 starboard Solar Alpha Rotary Joint (SARJ). | | | |
| 278. | STS-120; EVA 3 | (United States) Scott Parazynski (United States) Douglas Wheelock | October 30, 2007; 08:45 | October 30, 2007; 15:53 | 7 hours, 08 minutes |
| 278. | STS-120; EVA 3 | Parazynski and Wheelock attached P6 to P5, installed P6/P5 umbilical connections, reconfigured S1 following its redeployment, and inspected the port SARJ. The inspection showed the SARJ to be in good condition. | | | |
| 279. | STS-120; EVA 4 | (United States) Scott Parazynski (United States) Douglas Wheelock | November 3, 2007; 10:03 | November 3, 2007; 17:22 | 7 hours, 19 minutes |
| 279. | STS-120; EVA 4 | Parazynski and Wheelock inspected and repaired the P6 solar array. | | | |
| 280. | Expedition 16; EVA 1 | (United States) Peggy Whitson (Russia) Yuri Malenchenko | November 9, 2007; 09:54 | November 9, 2007; 16:49 | 6 hours, 55 minutes |
| 280. | Expedition 16; EVA 1 | Whitson and Malenchenko disconnected and stored the Station-to-Shuttle Power Transfer System cables, stored the PMA-2 umbilical, and stowed a Harmony node avionics umbilical into a temporary position. | | | |
| 281. | Expedition 16; EVA 2 | (United States) Peggy Whitson (United States) Daniel Tani | November 20, 2007; 10:10 | November 20, 2007; 17:26 | 7 hours, 16 minutes |
| 281. | Expedition 16; EVA 2 | Whitson and Tani completed half the external configuration of PMA-2 and Harmony. Fluid, electrical, and data lines were attached, avionics lines were hooked up, heater cables were attached, and a fluid tray was relocated. | | | |
| 282. | Expedition 16; EVA 3 | (United States) Peggy Whitson (United States) Daniel Tani | November 24, 2007; 09:50 | November 24, 2007; 16:54 | 7 hours, 04 minutes |
| 282. | Expedition 16; EVA 3 | Whitson and Tani completed fluid, electrical, and data line hookups for PMA-2 and Harmony. They connected the Loop B Fluid Tray to the port side of the Destiny laboratory. They then inspected and photographed the starboard Solar Alpha Rotary Joint (SARJ) to assist with troubleshooting on the ground. | | | |
| 283. | Expedition 16; EVA 4 | (United States) Peggy Whitson (United States) Daniel Tani | December 18, 2007; 09:50 | December 18, 2007; 16:46 | 6 hours, 56 minutes |
| 283. | Expedition 16; EVA 4 | Whitson and Tani inspected the S4 starboard Solar Alpha Rotary Joint (SARJ), and a Beta Gimbal Assembly (BGA). This EVA was the 100th in support of building the International Space Station. Records: 100th EVA in support of assembly and maintenance of the International Space Station. | | | |

=== 2008 spacewalks ===
| # | Spacecraft | Spacewalkers | Start (UTC) | End (UTC) | Duration |
|---|---|---|---|---|---|
| 284. | Expedition 16; EVA 5 | (United States) Peggy Whitson (United States) Daniel Tani | January 30, 2008; 09:56 | January 30, 2008; 17:06 | 7 hours, 10 minutes |
| 284. | Expedition 16; EVA 5 | Whitson and Tani replaced the Bearing Motor Roll Ring Module on one of the station's solar wings, and inspected and photographed the starboard Solar Alpha Rotary Joint (SARJ). | | | |
| 285. | STS-122; EVA 1 | (United States) Rex J. Walheim (United States) Stanley G. Love | February 11, 2008; 14:13 | February 11, 2008; 22:11 | 7 hours, 58 minutes |
| 285. | STS-122; EVA 1 | Walheim and Love installed a grapple fixture on Columbus while it was still in the shuttle's payload bay, prepared electrical and data connections on Columbus, and replaced the P1 truss nitrogen (N2) tank used for pressurizing the station's ammonia cooling system. | | | |
| 286. | STS-122; EVA 2 | (United States) Rex J. Walheim (Germany) Hans Schlegel | February 13, 2008; 14:27 | February 13, 2008; 21:12 | 6 hours, 45 minutes |
| 286. | STS-122; EVA 2 | Walheim and Schlegel installed the P1 Truss Nitrogen (N2) tank assembly, stowed the old N2 tank assembly into the shuttle's payload bay, and completed routing for the Station-to-Shuttle Power Transfer System (SSPTS). | | | |
| 287. | STS-122; EVA 3 | (United States) Rex J. Walheim (United States) Stanley G. Love | February 15, 2008; 13:07 | February 15, 2008; 20:32 | 7 hours, 25 minutes |
| 287. | STS-122; EVA 3 | Walheim and Love installed the Solar Monitoring Observatory (SOLAR) telescope and the European Technology Exposure Facility (EuTEF) facility onto an External Stowage Platform (ESP) on Columbus. They retrieved a failed Control Moment Gyroscope (CMG), installed the failed CMG into the shuttle's payload bay, and installed keel pin cloth covers on Columbus. | | | |
| 288. | STS-123; EVA 1 | (United States) Richard M. Linnehan (United States) Garrett Reisman | March 14, 2008; 01:18 | March 14, 2008; 08:19 | 7 hours, 1 minute |
| 288. | STS-123; EVA 1 | Linnehan and Reisman installed the Japanese Experiment Logistics Module, Pressurized Section (ELM-PS) onto its temporary location on top of Harmony, and began assembly of the Special Purpose Dexterous Manipulator (Dextre) . | | | |
| 289. | STS-123; EVA 2 | (United States) Richard Linnehan (United States) Michael J. Foreman | March 15, 2008; 23:49 | March 16, 2008; 06:57 | 7 hours, 8 minutes |
| 289. | STS-123; EVA 2 | Linnehan and Foreman continued assembly of Dextre, and attached two "arms" to Dextre. | | | |
| 290. | STS-123; EVA 3 | (United States) Richard Linnehan (United States) Robert L. Behnken | March 17, 2008; 22:51 | March 18, 2008; 05:44 | 6 hours, 53 minutes |
| 290. | STS-123; EVA 3 | Linnehan and Behnken completed the assembly of Dextre. The spacewalkers also installed spare equipment for the station onto an external stowage platform (ESP) on the Quest airlock, including a yaw joint for the station's robotic arm, Canadarm2, and two spare direct current switching units. Their attempt to attach the MISSE 6 experiment onto the Columbus module was unsuccessful as the latching pins failed to engage. | | | |
| 291. | STS-123; EVA 4 | (United States) Robert Behnken (United States) Michael Foreman | March 20, 2008; 22:04 | March 21, 2008; 04:28 | 6 hours, 24 minutes |
| 291. | STS-123; EVA 4 | Behnken and Foreman replaced a Remote Power Control (RPC) module, and tested shuttle thermal tile repair materials and techniques. They then removed a cover from the left arm of Dextre, and removed launch locks from the Harmony module. The spacewalkers also released the launch locks on Harmony's port and nadir Common Berthing Mechanisms (CBM). | | | |
| 292. | STS-123; EVA 5 | (United States) Robert Behnken (United States) Michael Foreman | March 22, 2008; 20:34 | March 23, 2008; 02:36 | 6 hours, 02 minutes |
| 292. | STS-123; EVA 5 | Behnken and Foreman completed storage of Shuttle Orbiter Boom Sensor System on the Station, installed the ELM‐PS trunnion covers, removed five covers from the starboard SARJ and performed inspections, captured digital photography, and successfully installed of the MISSE 6 experiment on the exterior of the Columbus module. | | | |
| 293. | STS-124; EVA 1 | (United States) Ronald J. Garan, Jr. (United States) Michael E. Fossum | June 3, 2008; 16:22 | June 3, 2008; 23:10 | 6 hours, 48 minutes |
| 293. | STS-124; EVA 1 | Garan and Fossum released the straps on the shuttle's robotic arm elbow joint camera, transferred the OBSS back to the shuttle, and repaired the Japanese Experiment Module, Pressurized Module (JEM-PM), named Kibo, for installation. They also replaced a trundle bearing assembly on the starboard Solar Alpha Rotary Joint, and inspected damage on the SARJ. | | | |
| 294. | STS-124; EVA 2 | (United States) Ronald J. Garan, Jr. (United States) Michael E. Fossum | June 5, 2008; 15:04 | June 5, 2008; 22:15 | 7 hours, 11 minutes |
| 294. | STS-124; EVA 2 | Garan and Fossum installed covers and external television equipment on the JEM, prepared the RMS, prepared for the relocation of the ELM-PS, prepared a depleted nitrogen tank assembly for removal, and prepared a new one stowed on an external stowage platform for installation. They also removed a television camera with a failed power supply. | | | |
| 295. | STS-124; EVA 3 | (United States) Ronald J. Garan, Jr. (United States) Michael E. Fossum | June 8, 2008; 13:55 | June 8, 2008; 20:28 | 6 hours 33 minutes |
| 295. | STS-124; EVA 3 | Garan and Fossum remove and replaced the starboard nitrogen tank assembly, finished fitting out the Kibō laboratory, and reinstalled the removed television camera with a repaired power supply. | | | |
| 296. | Expedition 17; EVA 1 | (Russia) Sergei Volkov (Russia) Oleg Kononenko | July 10, 2008; 18:48 | July 11, 2008; 01:06 | 6 hours 18 minutes |
| 296. | Expedition 17; EVA 1 | Volkov and Kononenko removed a pyrotechnic bolt from the docked Soyuz. | | | |
| 297. | Expedition 17; EVA 2 | (Russia) Sergei Volkov (Russia) Oleg Kononenko | July 15, 2008; 17:08 | July 15, 2008; 23:02 | 5 hours 54 minutes |
| 297. | Expedition 17; EVA 2 | Volkov and Kononenko installed a docking target on the Zvezda service module, installed the Vsplesk experiment, straightened the ham radio antenna, and retrieved the Biorisk experiment. | | | |
| 298. | Shenzhou 7 EVA 1 | (China) Zhai Zhigang (China) Liu Boming (Stand up only) | September 27, 2008; 08:38 | September 27, 2008; 09:00 | 0 hours 22 minutes |
| 298. | Shenzhou 7 EVA 1 | This was the first EVA conducted by China. Zhai collected an experimental package from the outside of the spacecraft and waved a Chinese flag towards a TV camera. Liu supported Zhai's activities while standing in the hatchway. | | | |
| 299. | STS-126; EVA 1 | (United States) Heidemarie Stefanyshyn-Piper (United States) Stephen G. Bowen | November 18, 2008; 18:09 | November 19, 2008; 01:01 | 6 hours, 52 minutes |
| 299. | STS-126; EVA 1 | Stefanyshyn-Piper and Bowen transferred an empty nitrogen tank assembly from ESP3 to the shuttle's cargo bay, transferred a new flex hose rotary coupler to ESP3 for future use, removed an insulation cover on the Kibo External Facility berthing mechanism, began cleaning and lubrication of the starboard SARJ, and replaced its 11 trundle bearing assemblies. | | | |
| 300. | STS-126; EVA 2 | (United States) Heidemarie Stefanyshyn-Piper (United States) Robert S. Kimbrough | November 20, 2008; 17:58 | November 21, 2008; 00:43 | 6 hours, 45 minutes |
| 300. | STS-126; EVA 2 | Stefanyshyn-Piper and Kimbrough relocated the two Crew and Equipment Translation Aid (CETA) carts from the starboard side of the Mobile Transporter to the port side, lubricated the station robotic arm's latching end effector A snare bearings, and continued cleaning and lubrication of the starboard SARJ. | | | |
| 301. | STS-126; EVA 3 | (United States) Heidemarie Stefanyshyn-Piper (United States) Stephen G. Bowen | November 22, 2008; 18:01 | November 23, 2008; 01:58 | 6 hours, 57 minutes |
| 301. | STS-126; EVA 3 | Stefanyshyn-Piper and Bowen completed cleaning and lubrication of all but one of the trundle bearing assemblies (TBA) on the starboard SARJ. The final TBA will be replaced during EVA 4. | | | |
| 302. | STS-126; EVA 4 | (United States) Stephen G. Bowen (United States) Robert S. Kimbrough | November 24, 2008; 18:24 | November 25, 2008; 00:31 | 6 hours, 7 minutes |
| 302. | STS-126; EVA 4 | 200th U.S. EVA. Bowen and Kimbrough completed the replacement of the trundle bearing assemblies on starboard SARJ, lubricated the port SARJ, installed a video camera, re‐installed insulation covers on the Kibo External Facility berthing mechanism, performed Kibo robotic arm grounding tab maintenance, installed spacewalk handrails on Kibo, installed Global Positioning Satellite (GPS) antennae on Kibo, photographed radiators, and photographed trailing umbilical system cables. | | | |
| 303. | Expedition 18; EVA 1 | (Russia) Yuri Lonchakov (United States) Michael Fincke | December 23, 2008; 00:51 | December 23, 2008; 06:29 | 5 hours, 38 minutes |
| 303. | Expedition 18; EVA 1 | Lonchakov and Fincke installed the electromagnetic energy measuring device (Langmuir probe) on Pirs, removed the Russian Biorisk long-duration experiment, installed the Expose-R experiment package on Zvezda, and installed the Impulse experiment. | | | |

=== 2009 spacewalks ===
| # | Spacecraft | Spacewalkers | Start (UTC) | End (UTC) | Duration |
|---|---|---|---|---|---|
| 304. | Expedition 18; EVA 2 | (Russia) Yuri Lonchakov (United States) Michael Fincke | March 10, 2009; 16:22 | March 10, 2009; 21:11 | 4 hours, 49 minutes |
| 304. | Expedition 18; EVA 2 | Lonchakov and Fincke installed the EXPOSE-R onto the universal science platform of the Zvezda module, removed tape straps from the area of the docking target on the Pirs airlock and docking compartment, inspected and photographed the exterior of the Russian portion of the station. | | | |
| 305. | STS-119; EVA 1 | (United States) Steven R. Swanson (United States) Richard R. Arnold | March 19, 2009; 17:16 | March 19, 2009; 23:23 | 6 hours, 7 minutes |
| 305. | STS-119; EVA 1 | Swanson and Arnold installed the Starboard 6 (S6) truss to the S5 truss, connected S5/S6 umbilicals, released launch restraints, removed keel pins, stored and removed thermal covers, and deployed the S6 photovoltaic radiator. | | | |
| 306. | STS-119; EVA 2 | (United States) Steven R. Swanson (United States) Joseph M. Acaba | March 21, 2009; 16:51 | March 21, 2009; 23:21 | 6 hours, 30 minutes |
| 306. | STS-119; EVA 2 | Swanson and Acaba prepared a worksite for STS-127, installed an unpressurized cargo carrier attachment system on the P3 truss, installed of a Global Positioning System antenna to the Kibo laboratory, and took infrared images of panels of the radiators on the P1 and S1 trusses. | | | |
| 307. | STS-119; EVA 3 | (United States) Joseph M. Acaba (United States) Richard R. Arnold | March 23, 2009; 15:37 | March 23, 2009; 22:04 | 6 hours, 27 minutes |
| 307. | STS-119; EVA 3 | Acaba and Arnold relocated a crew equipment cart, lubricated the station arm's grapple snares, and attempted to deploy a cargo carrier. | | | |
| 308. | STS-125; EVA 1 | (United States) John M. Grunsfeld (United States) Andrew J. Feustel | May 14, 2009; 12:52 | May 14, 2009; 20:12 | 7 hours, 20 minutes |
| 308. | STS-125; EVA 1 | Replaced the Wide Field and Planetary Camera 2 (WFPC 2) with Wide Field Camera 3 (WFPC III), replaced the Science Instrument Command and Data Handling Unit, lubricated three of the shroud doors, and installed a mechanism for spacecraft to capture Hubble for de-orbit at the end of the telescope's life (Soft Capture Mechanism). | | | |
| 309. | STS-125; EVA 2 | (United States) Michael J. Massimino (United States) Michael T. Good | May 15, 2009; 12:49 | May 15, 2009; 20:45 | 7 hours, 56 minutes |
| 309. | STS-125; EVA 2 | Removed and replaced all three of Hubble's gyroscope rate sensing units (RSUs). Removed the first of two battery unit modules. | | | |
| 310. | STS-125; EVA 3 | (United States) John M. Grunsfeld (United States) Andrew J. Feustel | May 16, 2009; 13:35 | May 16, 2009; 20:11 | 6 hours, 36 minutes |
| 310. | STS-125; EVA 3 | Removed COSTAR corrective optics package and installed Cosmic Origins Spectrograph. Repaired Advanced Camera for Surveys including get-ahead by completing steps from EVA-5. | | | |
| 311. | STS-125; EVA 4 | (United States) Michael J. Massimino (United States) Michael T. Good | May 17, 2009; 13:45 | May 17, 2009; 21:47 | 8 hours, 2 minutes |
| 311. | STS-125; EVA 4 | Repaired Space Telescope Imaging Spectrograph. | | | |
| 312. | STS-125; EVA 5 | (United States) John M. Grunsfeld (United States) Andrew J. Feustel | May 18, 2009; 13:20 | May 18, 2009; 20:22 | 7 hours, 2 minutes |
| 312. | STS-125; EVA 5 | The twenty third and final spacewalk to service Hubble and last planned EVA from the Shuttle airlock replaced the final battery module, installed Fine Guidance Sensor No. 3, removed degraded insulation panels from bays 8, 5 and 7, and installed three New Outer Blanket Layer (NOBL)s in their place, and removed and reinstalled a protective cover around Hubble's low-gain antenna. | | | |
| 313. | Expedition 20; EVA 1 | (Russia) Gennady Padalka (United States) Michael R. Barratt | June 5, 2009; 7:52 | June 5, 2009; 12:46 | 4 hours, 54 minutes |
| 313. | Expedition 20; EVA 1 | Prepared the Zvezda service module transfer compartment for the arrival of the Mini-Research Module 2, installed docking antenna for the module, photographed antenna for evaluation on the ground, and photographed the Strela-2 crane. | | | |
| 314. | Expedition 20; EVA 2 | (Russia) Gennady Padalka (United States) Michael R. Barratt | June 10, 2009; 6:55 | June 10, 2009; 7:07 | 12 minutes |
| 314. | Expedition 20; EVA 2 | Internal spacewalk in the depressurized Zvezda transfer compartment, replaced one of the Zvezda hatches with a docking cone, in preparation for the docking of the Mini-Research Module 2, or MRM2, later this year. The MRM2 will dock automatically to the zenith port of Zvezda, and serve as an additional docking port for Russian vehicles. | | | |
| 315. | STS-127; EVA 1 | (United States) David Wolf (United States) Timothy L. Kopra | July 18, 2009; 16:19 | July 18, 2009; 21:51 | 5 hours, 32 minutes |
| 315. | STS-127; EVA 1 | JEF installed and P3 Nadir UCCAS deployed. S3 Zenith Outboard PAS deploy postponed due to time constraints. | | | |
| 316. | STS-127; EVA 2 | (United States) David Wolf (United States) Thomas Marshburn | July 20, 2009; 15:27 | July 20, 2009; 22:20 | 6 hours, 53 minutes |
| 316. | STS-127; EVA 2 | Transferred Orbital Replacement Units (ORUs) from the Shuttle Integrated Cargo Carrier (ICC) to the External Stowage Platform-3 (ESP3). Transferred materials included a spare high-gain antenna, cooling-system pump module and spare parts for the Mobile Servicing System. JEF Visual Equipment (JEF-VE) installation on the forward section was postponed due to time constraints. | | | |
| 317. | STS-127; EVA 3 | (United States) David Wolf (United States) Christopher Cassidy | July 22, 2009; 14:32 | July 22, 2009; 20:31 | 5 hours, 59 minutes |
| 317. | STS-127; EVA 3 | JPM preparation work, ICS-EF MLI, and P6 battery replacement (2 of 6 units). EVA was cut short due to high levels of CO_{2} in Cassidy's suit. | | | |
| 318. | STS-127; EVA 4 | (United States) Thomas Marshburn (United States) Christopher Cassidy | July 24, 2009; 13:54 | July 24, 2009; 21:06 | 7 hours, 12 minutes |
| 318. | STS-127; EVA 4 | P6 battery replacement (final 4 of 6). | | | |
| 319. | STS-127; EVA 5 | (United States) Thomas Marshburn (United States) Christopher Cassidy | July 27, 2009; 11:33 | July 27, 2009; 16:27 | 4 hours, 54 minutes |
| 319. | STS-127; EVA 5 | SPDM thermal cover adjustment, Z1 patch panel reconfiguration, JEM visual equipment (JEM-VE) installation (forward and aft), and JEM-LTA reconfigurations. S3 Nadir PAS (outboard) deployment postponed to later mission. | | | |
| 320. | STS-128; EVA 1 | (United States) John D. Olivas (United States) Nicole P. Stott | September 1, 2009; 21:49 | September 2, 2009; 04:24 | 6 hours, 35 minutes |
| 320. | STS-128; EVA 1 | Prepared for the replacement of an empty ammonia tank on the station's port truss by releasing its bolts. Retrieved the Materials International Space Station Experiment and European Technology Exposure Facility mounted outside the Columbus laboratory, and stowed them in Discovery's cargo bay for their return to Earth. | | | |
| 321. | STS-128; EVA 2 | (Sweden) Christer Fuglesang (United States) John D. Olivas | September 3, 2009; 22:13 | September 4, 2009; 04:51 | 6 hours, 39 minutes |
| 321. | STS-128; EVA 2 | Removed the new ammonia tank from the shuttle's payload bay and replaced it with the used tank from the station. The new tank, weighing about 1,800 pounds (820 kg), was the most mass ever moved by spacewalking astronauts. | | | |
| 322. | STS-128; EVA 3 | (Sweden) Christer Fuglesang (United States) John D. Olivas | September 5, 2009; 20:39 | September 6, 2009; 03:40 | 7 hours, 1 minute |
| 322. | STS-128; EVA 3 | Preparations for the arrival of the Tranquility node by attaching cables between the starboard truss and the Unity node, the area where Tranquility will be installed. Tranquility is targeted to arrive on STS-130 in February 2010. The spacewalkers also replaced a communications sensor device, installed two new GPS antennas, and replaced a circuit breaker. | | | |
| 323. | STS-129; EVA 1 | (United States) Michael Foreman (United States) Robert Satcher | November 19, 2009; 14:24 | November 19, 2009; 21:01 | 6 hours, 37 minutes |
| 323. | STS-129; EVA 1 | Installed a spare antenna on the station's truss and a bracket for ammonia lines on the Unity module. Lubricated the grapple mechanism on the Payload Orbital Replacement Unit Attachment Device on the Mobile Base System and lubricated the snares of the hand of the station's Japanese robotic arm. Deployed the S3 outboard Payload Attach System. | | | |
| 324. | STS-129; EVA 2 | (United States) Michael Foreman (United States) Randolph Bresnik | November 21, 2009; 14:31 | November 21, 2009; 20:39 | 6 hours, 8 minutes |
| 324. | STS-129; EVA 2 | Installed the GATOR (Grappling Adaptor to On-Orbit Railing) bracket to the Columbus laboratory and an additional ham radio antenna. Installed on the truss an antenna for wireless helmet camera video. Relocated the Floating Potential Measurement Unit that records electrical potential around the station as it orbits the Earth. Deployed two brackets to attach cargo on the truss. | | | |
| 325. | STS-129; EVA 3 | (United States) Robert Satcher (United States) Randolph Bresnik | November 23, 2009; 13:24 | November 23, 2009; 19:06 | 5 hours, 42 minutes |
| 325. | STS-129; EVA 3 | Installed new High Pressure Gas Tank (HPGT) on Quest airlock. Installed MISSE-7A and 7B on ELC-2. Strapped two micrometeoroid and orbital debris (MMOD) shields to External Stowage Platform #2. Relocated foot restraint, released a bolt on Ammonia Tank Assembly, installed insulated covers on cameras on mobile servicing system and Canadarm 2's end effector. Worked heater cables on docking adapter. | | | |

== 2010–2014 spacewalks ==
Spacewalk beginning and ending times are given in Coordinated Universal Time (UTC).

=== 2010 spacewalks ===
| # | Spacecraft | Spacewalkers | Start (UTC) | End (UTC) | Duration |
|---|---|---|---|---|---|
| 326. | Expedition 22; EVA 1 | (Russia) Oleg Kotov (Russia) Maksim Surayev | January 14, 2010; 10:05 | January 14, 2010; 15:49 | 5 hours, 44 minutes |
| 326. | Expedition 22; EVA 1 | Prepared Poisk Mini-Research Module 2 for future dockings. | | | |
| 327. | STS-130; EVA 1 | (United States) Robert L. Behnken (United States) Nicholas Patrick | February 12, 2010; 02:17 | February 12, 2010; 08:49 | 6 hours, 32 minutes |
| 327. | STS-130; EVA 1 | Removed a protective cover on a port on the Unity node where Tranquility was berthed halfway through the spacewalk. Transferred a spare parts platform for the Special Purpose Dexterous Manipulator from the shuttle to the station. Made several connections on the newly installed Tranquility node to begin its activation. | | | |
| 328. | STS-130; EVA 2 | (United States) Robert L. Behnken (United States) Nicholas Patrick | February 14, 2010; 02:20 | February 14, 2010; 08:14 | 5 hours, 54 minutes |
| 328. | STS-130; EVA 2 | Installed ammonia plumbing and connectors between Unity, Destiny and Tranquility and covered them with thermal insulation. Prepared the nadir port on Tranquility for the relocation of the Cupola, and installed handrails on the exterior of Tranquility. | | | |
| 329. | STS-130; EVA 3 | (United States) Robert L. Behnken (United States) Nicholas Patrick | February 17, 2010; 02:15 | February 17, 2010; 08:03 | 5 hours, 48 minutes |
| 329. | STS-130; EVA 3 | Installed additional ammonia plumbing between Unity and Tranquility, removed insulation and launch locks from the Cupola, installed additional handrails on the exterior of Tranquility and performed get-ahead tasks to support the installation of a PDGF on the exterior of Zarya with cable installation on Unity and the S0 truss. | | | |
| 330. | STS-131; EVA 1 | (United States) Richard Mastracchio (United States) Clayton Anderson | April 9, 2010; 05:31 | April 9, 2010; 11:58 | 6 hours, 27 minutes |
| 330. | STS-131; EVA 1 | Relocated a new ammonia tank from the Shuttle's payload bay to a temporary stowage location and disconnected the fluid lines to the old ammonia tank on the S1 truss. Retrieved a Japanese seed experiment from the exterior of the Kibo laboratory for return to Earth and replaced a failed gyroscope on the S0 truss. Performed get-ahead tasks including the opening of a window flap on the zenith CBM of Harmony, and removed launch restraint bolts from a Flex Hose Rotary Coupler (FHRC) on the P1 truss. | | | |
| 331. | STS-131; EVA 2 | (United States) Richard Mastracchio (United States) Clayton Anderson | April 11, 2010; 05:30 | April 11, 2010; 12:56 | 7 hours, 26 minutes |
| 331. | STS-131; EVA 2 | The old ammonia tank was removed from the S1 truss and was replaced with the new tank. The electrical connections to the tank were made, but the fluid lines were deferred to the mission's third EVA due to time constraints since the installation was prolonged by a problem with the bolts that hold the tank to the truss. The old tank was relocated to a temporary stowage location on the station and a foot restraint was relocated in preparation for a future shuttle mission's spacewalk. | | | |
| 332. | STS-131; EVA 3 | (United States) Richard Mastracchio (United States) Clayton Anderson | April 13, 2010; 06:14 | April 13, 2010; 12:36 | 6 hours, 24 minutes |
| 332. | STS-131; EVA 3 | The fluid lines were connected to the new ammonia tank and the old tank was moved to the shuttle's payload bay for return to Earth. Micro-meteoroid debris shields from the Quest airlock which were no longer necessary were brought inside the airlock for return to Earth inside the Leonardo MPLM. The Z1 truss was prepared for the installation of a spare antenna on the next shuttle mission, and a foot restraint was relocated in preparation for a future spacewalk. The retrieval of an external carrier plate on Columbus was deferred to another shuttle mission due to time constraints after problems were encountered with attaching the old ammonia tank to a carrier in the payload bay, and several other tasks were deferred to later EVAs due to the replanning from the problems with the mission's second EVA. | | | |
| 333. | STS-132; EVA 1 | (United States) Garrett Reisman (United States) Stephen G. Bowen | May 17, 2010; 11:54 | May 17, 2010; 19:19 | 7 hours, 25 minutes |
| 333. | STS-132; EVA 1 | Installed a spare space-to-ground Ku-band antenna on the Z1 truss; installed new tool platform on Dextre, and broke torque on bolts holding replacement batteries to the ICC-VLD cargo carrier. | | | |
| 334. | STS-132; EVA 2 | (United States) Stephen G. Bowen (United States) Michael T. Good | May 19, 2010; 10:38 | May 19, 2010; 17:47 | 7 hours, 9 minutes |
| 334. | STS-132; EVA 2 | Repaired Atlantis' Orbiter Boom Sensor System (OBSS); P6 battery replacement (4 of 6 units); and removed gimbal locks from the Ku-band antenna installed on the first EVA of the mission. | | | |
| 335. | STS-132; EVA 3 | (United States) Michael T. Good (United States) Garrett Reisman | May 21, 2010; 10:27 | May 21, 2010; 17:13 | 6 hours, 46 minutes |
| 335. | STS-132; EVA 3 | P6 battery replacement (final 2 of 6 units); installed ammonia "jumpers" at the P4/P5 interface; retrieved a spare PDGF from Atlantis' payload bay and stowed it inside the Quest airlock. The spacewalkers also replenished supplies of EVA tools in toolboxes on the exterior of the station. | | | |
| 336. | Expedition 24; EVA 1 | (Russia) Fyodor Yurchikhin (Russia) Mikhail Korniyenko | July 27, 2010; 04:11 | July 27, 2010; 10:53 | 6 hours, 42 minutes |
| 336. | Expedition 24; EVA 1 | Prepared Rassvet module to allow future Russian vehicles to dock using Kurs automated rendezvous system capability. Routed and mated command and data handling cables on Zvezda and Zarya modules. | | | |
| 337. | Expedition 24; EVA 2 | (United States) Douglas H. Wheelock (United States) Tracy Caldwell Dyson | August 7, 2010; 11:19 | August 7, 2010; 19:22 | 8 hours, 3 minutes |
| 337. | Expedition 24; EVA 2 | Attempted to replace failed ammonia pump module. The spacewalkers did not complete all of the planned tasks due to a quick disconnect that got stuck and would not release. The pair had to complete a "bake-out" in order to ensure there was no ammonia on their suits before re-entering the Space Station. | | | |
| 338. | Expedition 24; EVA 3 | (United States) Douglas H. Wheelock (United States) Tracy Caldwell Dyson | August 11, 2010; 12:27 | August 11, 2010; 19:53 | 7 hours, 26 minutes |
| 338. | Expedition 24; EVA 3 | Completed removal of failed pump module from the S1 truss and began installation preparations on the replacement pump. | | | |
| 339. | Expedition 24; EVA 4 | (United States) Douglas H. Wheelock (United States) Tracy Caldwell Dyson | August 16, 2010; 10:20 | August 16, 2010; 17:40 | 7 hours, 20 minutes |
| 339. | Expedition 24; EVA 4 | Installed new pump module on the S1 truss. | | | |
| 340. | Expedition 25; EVA 1 | (Russia) Fyodor Yurchikhin (Russia) Oleg Skripochka | November 15, 2010; 14:55 | November 15, 2010; 21:22 | 6 hours, 27 minutes |
| 340. | Expedition 25; EVA 1 | Installed: portable multipurpose workstation in Zvezda Plane IV; struts between Poisk and Zvezda and Zarya modules; hand-rail on Pirs docking module; SKK #1-M2 cassette on Poisk module. Removed: Plasma Pulse Injector Science hardware and Expose-R scientific experiment from portable multipurpose workstation in Zvezda Plane II; Kontur science hardware (ROKVISS); TV camera from Rassvet module. Performed Test experiment to check for microorganisms or contamination underneath insulation on the Russian ISS segment. Cosmonauts failed to relocate TV camera due to interference from insulation at installation location. | | | |

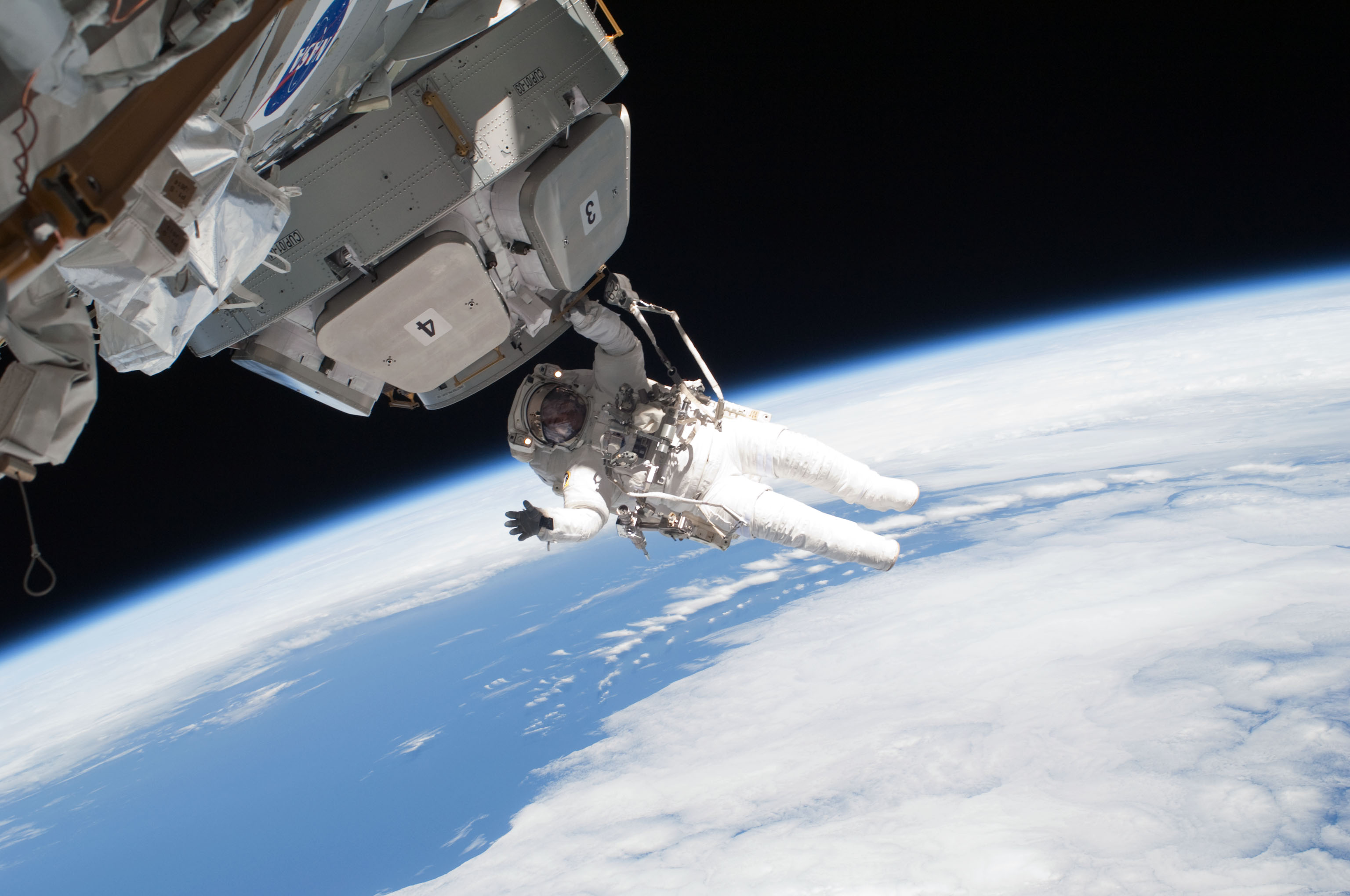
Nicholas Patrick works on the exterior of the Cupola during the third EVA of the STS-130 mission, February 17, 2010.

=== 2011 spacewalks ===
| # | Spacecraft | Spacewalkers | Start (UTC) | End (UTC) | Duration |
|---|---|---|---|---|---|
| 341. | Expedition 26; EVA 1 | (Russia) Dmitri Kondratyev (Russia) Oleg Skripochka | January 21, 2011; 14:29 | January 21, 2011; 19:52 | 5 hours, 23 minutes |
| 341. | Expedition 26; EVA 1 | Installed an experimental communication antenna on Zvezda's nadir side, removed and stowed a failed plasma pulse generator experiment apparatus and a material exposure experiment from Zvezda, and installed a docking TV camera on the Rassvet module. | | | |
| 342. | Expedition 26; EVA 2 | (Russia) Dmitri Kondratyev (Russia) Oleg Skripochka | February 16, 2011; 13:30 | February 16, 2011; 18:21 | 4 hours, 51 minutes |
| 342. | Expedition 26; EVA 2 | Installed two experiments for Earth seismic and lightning observations on the Zvezda module, removed two material exposure experiment panels from the exterior of the Zarya module, and jettisoned a foot restraint overboard. | | | |
| 343. | STS-133; EVA 1 | (United States) B. Alvin Drew (United States) Stephen Bowen | February 28, 2011; 15:46 | February 28, 2011; 22:20 | 6 hours, 34 minutes |
| 343. | STS-133; EVA 1 | Drew and Bowen installed a power extension cable between the Unity and Tranquility nodes to provide a contingency power source should it be required. The spacewalkers then moved the failed ammonia pump module that was replaced in August from its temporary location to the External Stowage Platform 2 adjacent to the Quest airlock. Drew and Bowen then installed a wedge under a camera on the S3 truss to provide clearance from the newly installed ELC-4. They next replaced a guide for the rail cart system used for moving the station robotic arm along the truss. The guides had been removed when astronauts were performing work on the station's starboard Solar Alpha Rotary Joint (SARJ), which rotates the solar arrays to track the Sun. The final task was to "fill" a special bottle with the vacuum of space for a Japanese education payload. The bottle will be part of a public museum exhibit. | | | |
| 344. | STS-133; EVA 2 | (United States) B. Alvin Drew (United States) Stephen Bowen | March 2, 2011; 15:42 | March 2, 2011; 21:56 | 6 hours, 14 minutes |
| 344. | STS-133; EVA 2 | Drew removed thermal insulation from a platform, while Bowen swapped out an attachment bracket on the Columbus module. Bowen then installed a camera assembly on the Dextre robot and removed insulation from Dextre's electronics platform. Drew installed a light on a cargo cart and repaired some dislodged thermal insulation from a valve on the truss. | | | |
| 345. | STS-134; EVA 1 | (United States) Andrew J. Feustel (United States) Gregory Chamitoff | May 20, 2011; 07:10 | May 20, 2011; 13:29 | 6 hours, 19 minutes |
| 345. | STS-134; EVA 1 | Retrieved two MISSE 7 experiments. Installed new package of MISSE 8 experiments on ELC-2. Installed jumpers between segments on left-side truss for ammonia refills; vented nitrogen from ammonia servicer; began installation of external wireless communication antenna on Destiny laboratory to provide wireless communication to ELCs on truss. Installation postponed due to bad CO_{2} sensor in Chamitoff's space suit. | | | |
| 346. | STS-134; EVA 2 | (United States) Andrew J. Feustel (United States) Michael Fincke | May 22, 2011; 06:05 | May 22, 2011; 14:12 | 8 hours, 7 minutes |
| 346. | STS-134; EVA 2 | Refilled Port 6 (P5) radiators with ammonia. Finished venting early ammonia system. Lubricated port SARJ and parts of ISS' Dextre robot. Installed grapple bars on port radiators. | | | |
| 347. | STS-134; EVA 3 | (United States) Andrew J. Feustel (United States) Michael Fincke | May 25, 2011; 05:43 | May 25, 2011; 12:37 | 6 hours, 54 minutes |
| 347. | STS-134; EVA 3 | Installed grapple fixture on Zarya module to support robotic operations. Installed additional cables to provide backup power to the Russian portion of the space station. Finished installation of wireless video system begun in EVA 1. | | | |
| 348. | STS-134; EVA 4 | (United States) Michael Fincke (United States) Gregory Chamitoff | May 27, 2011; 04:15 | May 27, 2011; 11:39 | 7 hours 24 minutes |
| 348. | STS-134; EVA 4 | Stowed OBSS on right-side truss. Retrieved grapple from left-side truss to replace grapple currently on boom. Released restraints from one of Dextre's spare arms. Replaced thermal insulation on spare gas tank for the Quest airlock. ISS assembly completed. | | | |
| 349. | Expedition 28; EVA 1 | (United States) Ronald J. Garan, Jr. (United States) Michael E. Fossum | July 12, 2011; 13:22 | July 12, 2011; 19:53 | 6 hours 31 minutes |
| 349. | Expedition 28; EVA 1 | Retrieved a failed ammonia pump module from the External Stowage Platform 2 and secured it in the Shuttle payload bay for returning to Earth. The Robotics Refueling Mission (RRM) payload was removed from the Shuttle payload bay and installed on a platform on the ISS. The two also retrieved a material science experiment, freed a stuck wire at a power grapple fixture, installed thermal covers at PMA-3 and reconfigured external equipment. | | | |
| 350. | Expedition 28; EVA 2 | (Russia) Sergei Volkov (Russia) Aleksandr Samokutyayev | August 3, 2011; 14:50 | August 3, 2011; 21:13 | 6 hours 23 minutes |
| 350. | Expedition 28; EVA 2 | Deployed the ARISSat-1 amateur radio satellite, installed experiment packages on the exterior of the Russian segment, removed unneeded antennas from the Poisk module, and made photograph documentation. Original task of relocating a Strela crane deferred. | | | |

=== 2012 spacewalks ===
| # | Spacecraft | Spacewalkers | Start (UTC) | End (UTC) | Duration |
|---|---|---|---|---|---|
| 351. | Expedition 30; EVA 1 | (Russia) Oleg Kononenko (Russia) Anton Shkaplerov | February 16, 2012; 14:31 | February 16, 2012; 20:46 | 6 hours, 15 minutes |
| 351. | Expedition 30; EVA 1 | Relocated the Strela-1 crane from the Pirs module to the Poisk module. Also installed the Vinoslivost Materials Sample Experiment and collected a test sample from underneath the insulation on the Zvezda service module to search for any signs of living organisms. | | | |
| 352. | Expedition 32; EVA 1 | (Russia) Gennady Padalka (Russia) Yuri Malenchenko | August 20, 2012; 15:37 | August 20, 2012; 21:28 | 5 hours, 51 minutes |
| 352. | Expedition 32; EVA 1 | Relocated the Strela-2 crane from the Pirs module to the Zarya module. Also deployed the Sfera-53 passive air density calibration satellite, installed five micro-meteoroid debris shields on the Zvezda module and retrieved external experiments. | | | |
| 353. | Expedition 32; EVA 2 | (United States) Sunita Williams (Japan) Akihiko Hoshide | August 30, 2012; 12:16 | August 30, 2012; 20:33 | 8 hours, 17 minutes |
| 353. | Expedition 32; EVA 2 | Connected two power cables between the US segment and the Russian segment on the ISS; removed and replaced Main Bus Switching Unit (MBSU) 1. The crew have difficulty in removing connecting bolts of the old MBSU, and were unable to tighten up the bolts for the new unit. The new MBSU was tied down for future trouble-shooting, with all other tasks deferred to a future EVA. Third-longest EVA in history. | | | |
| 354. | Expedition 32; EVA 3 | (United States) Sunita Williams (Japan) Akihiko Hoshide | September 5, 2012; 11:06 | September 5, 2012; 17:34 | 6 hours, 28 minutes |
| 354. | Expedition 32; EVA 3 | Installed the new MBSU unit, working around difficulty with one of the bolts; replaced one of the cameras mounted on the CanadArm. During this spacewalk, Sunita Williams broke Peggy Whitson's record for most total time spacewalking by a woman. | | | |
| 355. | Expedition 33; EVA 1 | (United States) Sunita Williams (Japan) Akihiko Hoshide | November 1, 2012; 12:29 | November 1, 2012; 19:07 | 6 hours, 38 minutes |
| 355. | Expedition 33; EVA 1 | Reconfigured and isolated a leak in the ammonia cooling system of power channel 2B on the P6 truss by-passing a leaking cooling loop and re-connecting jumpers to an unused loop of the Early External Thermal Control System (EETCS), and by re-deploying the trailing Thermal Control Radiator of the system. | | | |

=== 2013 spacewalks ===
| # | Spacecraft | Spacewalkers | Start (UTC) | End (UTC) | Duration |
|---|---|---|---|---|---|
| 356. | Expedition 35; EVA 1 | (Russia) Pavel Vinogradov (Russia) Roman Romanenko | April 19, 2013; 14:03 | April 19, 2013; 20:41 | 6 hours, 38 minutes |
| 356. | Expedition 35; EVA 1 | Installed the Obstanovka plasma waves and ionosphere experiment to the exterior of the Zvezda service module. Also replaced a faulty retro-reflector device used as navigational aids for the Automatic Transfer Vehicle and retrieved the Biorisk microbe exposure experiment. An attempt to retrieve the Vinoslivost materials sample experiment failed when it was accidentally dropped while being taken back to the Pirs module airlock. | | | |
| 357. | Expedition 35; EVA 2 | (United States) Christopher Cassidy (United States) Thomas Marshburn | May 11, 2013; 12:44 | May 11, 2013; 18:14 | 5 hours, 30 minutes |
| 357. | Expedition 35; EVA 2 | Replaced the 2B Pump Flow Control Subassembly (PFCS) on the Port 6 truss in attempting to locate the source of an ammonia coolant leak on the Port 6 truss Photo Voltaic Thermal Control System (PVTCS). | | | |
| 358. | Expedition 36; EVA 1 | (Russia) Fyodor Yurchikhin (Russia) Aleksandr Misurkin | June 24, 2013; 13:32 | June 24, 2013; 20:06 | 6 hours, 34 minutes |
| 358. | Expedition 36; EVA 1 | Replaced a fluid flow regulator on the Zarya module, testing of the Kurs docking system on the station ahead of the arrival of a new Russian module, installing the “Indicator” experiment, installing gap spanners on to the outside of the station and photographing the multilayer insulation (MLI) protecting the Russian segment from micrometeoroids and taking samples from the exterior surface of the pressure hull underneath the MLI to identify signs of pressure hull material microscopic deterioration. | | | |
| 359. | Expedition 36; EVA 2 | (United States) Christopher Cassidy (Italy) Luca Parmitano | July 9, 2013; 12:02 | July 9, 2013; 18:09 | 6 hours, 7 minutes |
| 359. | Expedition 36; EVA 2 | Replaced a failed Space-to-Ground Transmitter Receiver Controller and the Mobile Base Camera Light Pan-Tilt Assembly, retrieved the MISSE-8 and ORMatE-III experiments, photographed the AMS-02, moved two Radiator Grapple Bars to either sides of the truss, routed power cables to support the addition of the new Russian MLM and installed a multi-layer insulation cover to protect the docking interface of PMA-2. | | | |
| 360. | Expedition 36; EVA 3 | (United States) Christopher Cassidy (Italy) Luca Parmitano | July 16, 2013; 11:57 | July 16, 2013; 13:29 | 1 hour, 32 minutes |
| 360. | Expedition 36; EVA 3 | Installed a Y-bypass jumper on power lines on the Z1 truss, routing 1553 data cables for a grapple fixture and Ethernet cables for a future Russian station module. The spacewalk was then cut short after Parmitano reported excess water leaking inside his helmet. | | | |
| 361. | Expedition 36; EVA 4 | (Russia) Fyodor Yurchikhin (Russia) Aleksandr Misurkin | August 16, 2013; 14:36 | August 16, 2013; 22:05 | 7 hours, 29 minutes |
| 361. | Expedition 36; EVA 4 | Routed power and Ethernet cables for later attachment to the future Nauka module. Also installed connectors between modules and a material science experiment. | | | |
| 362. | Expedition 36; EVA 5 | (Russia) Fyodor Yurchikhin (Russia) Aleksandr Misurkin | August 22, 2013; 11:34 | August 22, 2013; 17:32 | 5 hours, 58 minutes |
| 362. | Expedition 36; EVA 5 | Removed a laser communication and installed an EVA work station and camera pointing platform outside the Zvezda service module, inspection and tightening of various antenna covers on Zvezda, and installed new spacewalk aids. | | | |
| 363. | Expedition 37; EVA 1 | (Russia) Oleg Kotov (Russia) Sergei Ryazanski | November 9, 2013; 14:34 | November 9, 2013; 20:24 | 5 hours, 50 minutes |
| 363. | Expedition 37; EVA 1 | Took the Olympic torch for the 2014 Winter Olympic Games to the outside of ISS. They also continued work on an extravehicular activity workstation and biaxial pointing platform by removing launch brackets and bolts, as well as retrieving an experimental package. The planned installation of a foot restraint on the mounting seat of the workstation was deferred to a future spacewalk after the spacewalkers noticed some issues with its alignment. | | | |
| 364. | Expedition 38; EVA 1 | (United States) Richard Mastracchio (United States) Michael S. Hopkins | December 21, 2013; 12:01 | December 21, 2013; 17:29 | 5 hours, 28 minutes |
| 364. | Expedition 38; EVA 1 | Removed ammonia fluid lines from Active Thermal Control System pump module; removed pump module from starboard truss and stowed it on Payload Orbital Replacement Unit Accommodation. | | | |
| 365. | Expedition 38; EVA 2 | (United States) Richard Mastracchio (United States) Michael S. Hopkins | December 24, 2013; 11:53 | December 24, 2013; 19:23 | 7 hours, 30 minutes |
| 365. | Expedition 38; EVA 2 | Retrieved spare ammonia pump module, installed it on starboard truss, and connected it to Loop A of Active Thermal Control System. | | | |
| 366. | Expedition 38; EVA 3 | (Russia) Oleg Kotov (Russia) Sergei Ryazanski | December 27, 2013; 13:00 | December 27, 2013; 21:07 | 8 hours, 7 minutes |
| 366. | Expedition 38; EVA 3 | Attempted installation of 2 HD cameras for commercial Earth observation on the outside of the Zvezda module, cancelled after one of the cameras failed to provide data to the ground during testing. Also installed and jettisoned experimental equipment outside the Russian segment. Longest Russian EVA in history. | | | |

=== 2014 spacewalks ===
| # | Spacecraft | Spacewalkers | Start (UTC) | End (UTC) | Duration |
|---|---|---|---|---|---|
| 367. | Expedition 38; EVA 4 | (Russia) Oleg Kotov (Russia) Sergei Ryazanski | January 27, 2014; 14:00 | January 27, 2014; 20:08 | 6 hours 8 minutes |
| 367. | Expedition 38; EVA 4 | Installed High Resolution Camera (HRC) on SM Plane IV; installed Medium Resolution Camera (MRC) on SM Plane IV; photographed electrical connectors on ФП11 and ФП19 connector patch panels of SM; removed Worksite Interfaces (WIF) adaptor from SSRMS LEE B; retrieved СКК #2-СО cassette container from DC-1. | | | |
| 368. | Expedition 39; EVA 1 | (United States) Richard Mastracchio (United States) Steven Swanson | April 23, 2014; 13:56 | April 23, 2014; 15:32 | 1 hours 36 minutes |
| 368. | Expedition 39; EVA 1 | Replaced failed Multiplexer/Demultiplexer (MDM) unit on S0 truss; also removed two lanyards from Secondary Power Distribution Assembly (SPDA) doors. | | | |
| 369. | Expedition 40; EVA 1 | (Russia) Alexander Skvortsov (Russia) Oleg Artemyev | June 19, 2014; 14:10 | June 19, 2014; 21:33 | 7 hours 23 minutes |
| 369. | Expedition 40; EVA 1 | Installed an automated phased antenna array used for the Russian command and telemetry system, relocated a part of the Obstanovka experiment that monitors charged particles and plasma in Low Earth Orbit, verifying the correct installation of the universal work platform (URM-D), taking samples from one of Zvezda's windows, and jettisoning an experiment frame. | | | |
| 370. | Expedition 40; EVA 2 | (Russia) Alexander Skvortsov (Russia) Oleg Artemyev | August 18, 2014; 14:02 | August 18, 2014; 19:13 | 5 hours, 11 minutes |
| 370. | Expedition 40; EVA 2 | Released Chasqui-1 cubesat into space; installed experiment packages (EXPOSE-R2 biological experiment, Plume Impingement and Deposit Monitoring unit), retrieved experiments (Vinoslivost materials exposure panel, Biorisk biological experiment), replaced cassette on SKK experiment and attached a handrail on an antenna. | | | |
| 371. | Expedition 41; EVA 1 | (United States) Reid Wiseman (Germany) Alexander Gerst | October 7, 2014; 12:30 | October 7, 2014; 18:43 | 6 hours, 13 minutes |
| 371. | Expedition 41; EVA 1 | Re-located a failed pump module to a permanent stowage position, installed a back-up power supply for the Mobile Transporter and replaced a light on the robotic arm. | | | |
| 372. | Expedition 41; EVA 2 | (United States) Reid Wiseman (United States) Barry E. Wilmore | October 15, 2014; 12:16 | October 15, 2014; 18:50 | 6 hours, 34 minutes |
| 372. | Expedition 41; EVA 2 | Replaced failed sequential shunt unit (SSU) for 3A power system, relocated articulating portable foot restraint/tool stanchion (APFR/TS), removed camera port (CP) 7, relocated wireless video system external transceiver assembly (WETA) from CP8 to CP11, installed external TV camera group at CP8. | | | |
| 373. | Expedition 41; EVA 3 | (Russia) Maksim Surayev (Russia) Aleksandr Samokutyayev | October 22, 2014; 13:28 | October 22, 2014; 17:06 | 3 hours, 38 minutes |
| 373. | Expedition 41; EVA 3 | Removed and jettisoned Radiometriya experiment from Zvezda Plane II, removed EXPOSE-R experiment protective cover, took surface samples from Pirs extravehicular hatch 2 window (TEST experiment), removed and jettisoned two KURS attennas 2ACф1-1 and 2ACф1-2 from Poisk, photographed exterior of ISS Russian segment. | | | |

For spacewalks that took place from the beginning of 2015 on, see List of spacewalks since 2015.

== See also ==
- Lists of spacewalks and moonwalks
- List of spacewalkers
- List of cumulative spacewalk records
