= Exterior space =

In mathematics, the notion of externology in a topological space X generalizes the basic properties of the family

ε^{X}_{cc} = {E ⊆ X : X\E is a closed compact subset of X}

of complements of the closed compact subspaces of X, which are used to construct its Alexandroff compactification. An externology permits to introduce a notion of end point, to study the divergence of nets in terms of convergence to end points and it is a useful tool for the study and classification of some families of non compact topological spaces. It can also be used to approach a topological space as the limit of other topological spaces: the externologies are very useful when a compact metric space embedded in a Hilbert space is approached by its open neighbourhoods.

== Definition ==
Let (X,τ) be a topological space. An externology on (X,τ) is a non-empty collection ε of open subsets satisfying:

- If E_{1}, E_{2} ∈ ε, then E_{1} ∩ E_{2} ∈ ε;
- if E ∈ ε, U ∈ τ and E ⊆ U, then U ∈ ε.

An exterior space (X,τ,ε) consists of a topological space (X,τ) together with an externology ε. An open E which is in ε is said to be an exterior-open subset. A map f:(X,τ,ε) → (X',τ',ε') is said to be an exterior map if it is continuous and f^{−1}(E) ∈ ε, for all E ∈ ε'.

The category of exterior spaces and exterior maps will be denoted by E. It is remarkable that E is a complete and cocomplete category.

== Some examples of exterior spaces ==
- For a space (X,τ) one can always consider the trivial externology ε_{tr}={X}, and, on the other hand, the total externology ε_{tot}=τ. Note that an externology ε is a topology if and only if the empty set is a member of ε if and only if ε=τ.
- Given a space (X,τ), the externology ε^{X}_{cc} of the complements of closed compact subsets of X permits a connection with the theory of proper maps.
- Given a space (X,τ) and a subset A⊆X the family ε(X,A)={U⊆X:A⊆U,U∈τ} is an externology in X. Two particular cases with important applications on shape theory and on dynamical systems, respectively, are the following:
- If A is a closed subspace of the Hilbert cube X=Q the externology ε^{A}=ε(Q,A) is a resolution of A in the sense of the shape theory.
- Let X be a continuous dynamical system and P the subset of periodic points; we can consider the externology ε(X,P). More generally, if A is an invariant subset the externology ε(X,A) is useful to study the dynamical properties of the flow.

== Applications of exterior spaces ==
- Proper homotopy theory: A continuous map f:X→Y between topological spaces is said to be proper if for every closed compact subset K of Y, f^{−1}(K) is a compact subset of X. The category of spaces and proper maps will be denoted by P. This category and the corresponding proper homotopy category are very useful for the study of non compact spaces. Nevertheless, one has the problem that this category does not have enough limits and colimits and then we can not develop the usual homotopy constructions like loops, homotopy limits and colimits, etc. An answer to this problem is the category of exterior spaces E which admits Quillen model structures and contains as a full subcategory the category of spaces and proper maps; that is, there is full and faithful functor P→E which carries a topological space (X,τ) to the exterior space (X,τ,ε^{X}_{cc}).
- Proper LS category: The problem of finding Ganea and Whitehead characterizations of this proper invariant can not be faced within the proper category because of the lack of (co)limits. Nevertheless, an extension of this invariant to the category of exterior spaces permits to find a solution to such a problem. This numerical proper invariant has been applied to the study of open 3-manifolds.
- Shape theory: Many shape invariants (Borsuk groups, Quigley inward and approaching groups) of a compact metric space can be obtained as exterior homotopy groups of the exterior space determined by the open neighborhoods of a compact metric space embedded in the Hilbert cube.
- Discrete and continuous dynamical systems (semi-flows and flows): There are many constructions that associate an exterior space to a dynamical system, for example: Given a continuous (discrete) flow one can consider the exterior spaces induced by the open neighborhoods of the subset of periodic points, Poisson periodic points, omega limits, etc. The constructions and properties of these associated exterior spaces are used to study the dynamical properties of the (semi-flow) flow.
