= List of cosmonauts =

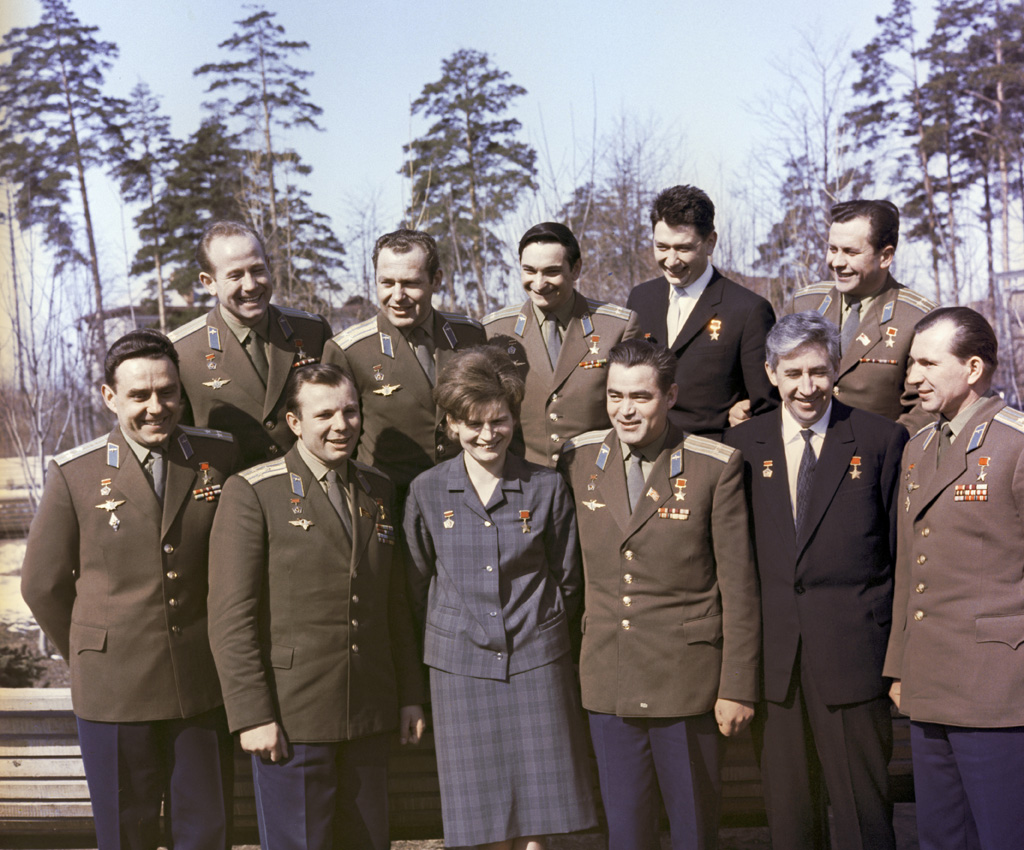
The first eleven Soviet cosmonauts, July 1965. Back row, left to right: Leonov, Titov, Bykovsky, Yegorov, Popovich; front row: Komarov, Gagarin, Tereshkova, Nikolayev, Feoktistov, Belyayev. All were awarded the Hero of the Soviet Union, worn on the left breast and the Pilot-Cosmonaut of the USSR decoration, worn on the right. By the time that the twelfth cosmonaut (Georgy Beregovoy) flew in 1968, Komarov and Gagarin were both dead.

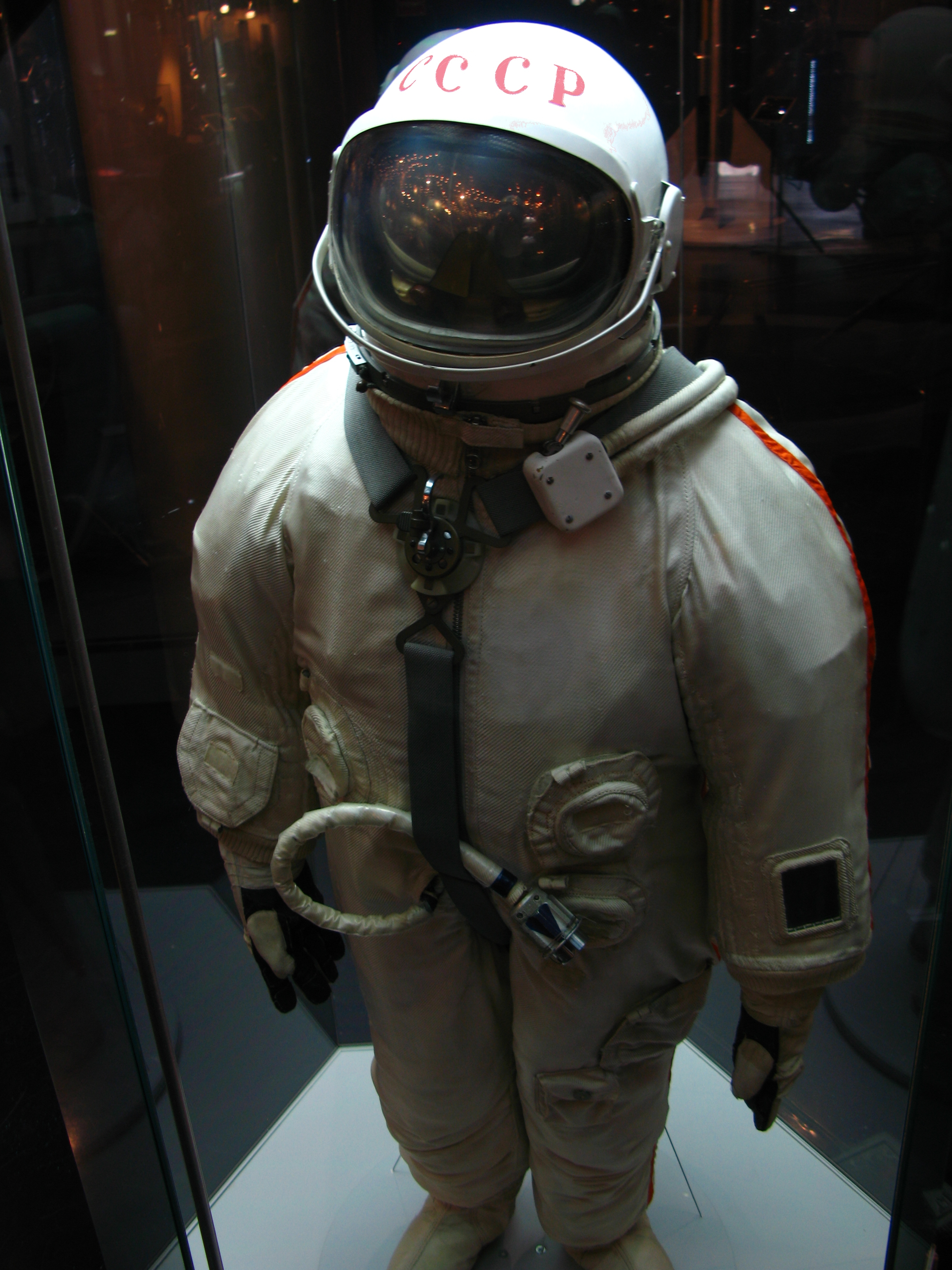
A Soviet space suit in the Museum of Cosmonautics, Moscow

This is a list of cosmonauts who have taken part in the missions of the Soviet space program and the Russian Federal Space Agency, including ethnic Russians and people of other ethnicities.

Soviet and Russian cosmonauts born outside Russia are marked with an asterisk and their place of birth is shown in an additional list.

For the full plain lists of Russian and Soviet cosmonauts in Wikipedia, see Category:Russian cosmonauts

Five female cosmonauts have flown on the Soviet/Russian program: Valentina Tereshkova, Svetlana Savitskaya, Yelena Kondakova, Yelena Serova and Anna Kikina.

== Russian and Soviet cosmonauts ==
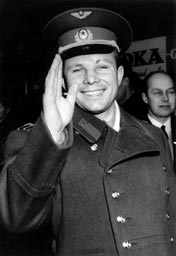
Soviet cosmonaut Yuri Gagarin, the first human in space

=== A ===
- Viktor Mikhaylovich Afanasyev — (Soviet Union) Soyuz TM-11, (Russia) Soyuz TM-18, Soyuz TM-29, Soyuz TM-33/32
- Vladimir Aksyonov (1935–2024) — (Soviet Union) Soyuz 22, Soyuz T-2
- Aleksandr Pavlovich Aleksandrov — (Soviet Union) Soyuz T-9, Soyuz TM-3
- Ivan Anikeyev (1933–1992) — (Soviet Union) Expelled from Vostok program; no flights.
- Oleg Artemyev* — (Russia) Soyuz TMA-12M, Soyuz MS-08, Soyuz MS-21
- Anatoly Artsebarsky* — (Soviet Union) Soyuz TM-12
- Yuri Artyukhin (1930–1998) — (Soviet Union) Soyuz 14
- Oleg Atkov — (Soviet Union) Soyuz T-10/11
- Toktar Aubakirov* — (Soviet Union) Soyuz TM-13/12
- Sergei Avdeyev — (Russia) Soyuz TM-15, Soyuz TM-22

=== B ===
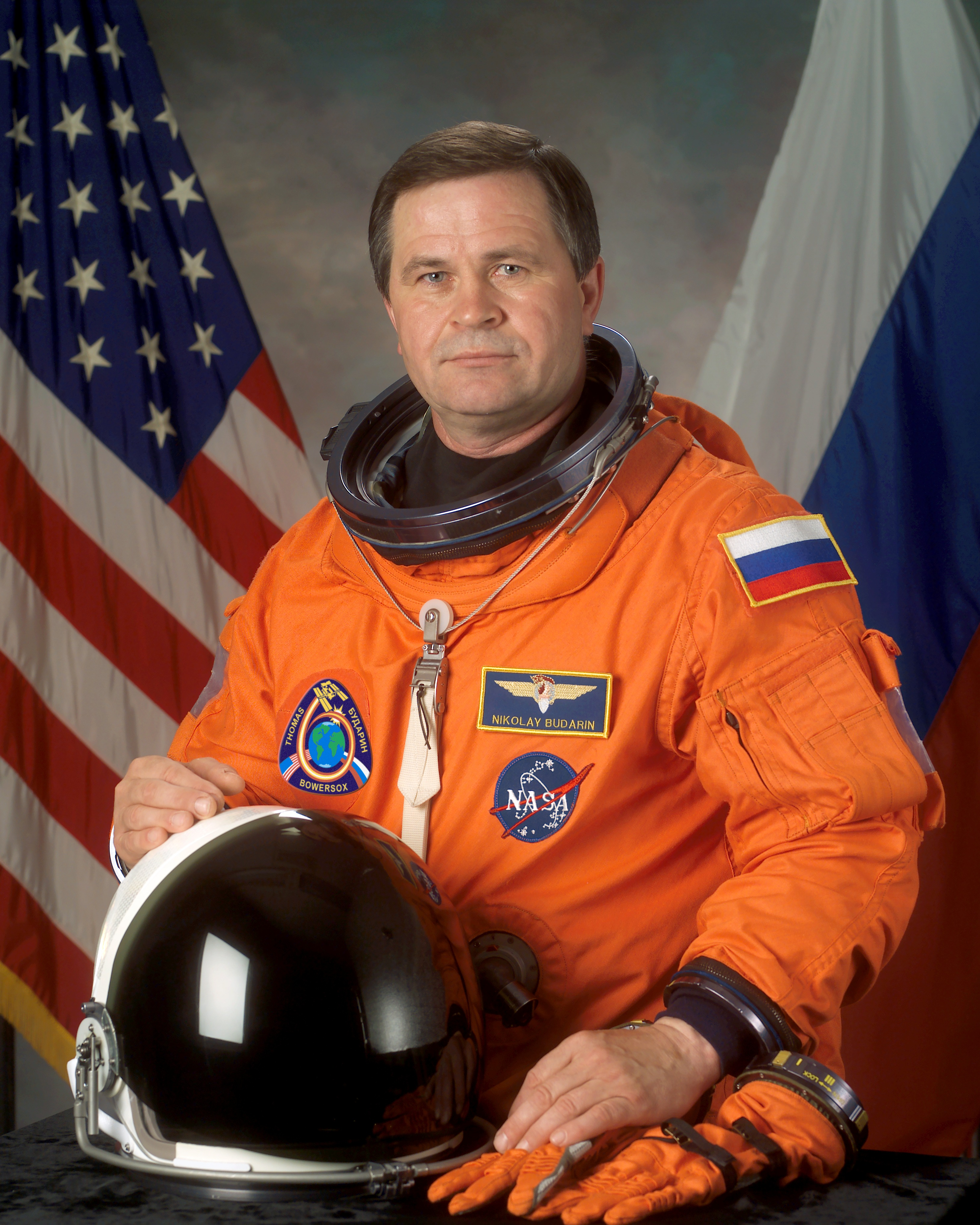
Nikolai Budarin

- Aleksandr Balandin — (Soviet Union) Soyuz TM-9
- Yuri Baturin — (Russia) Soyuz TM-28/27, Soyuz TM-32/31
- Pavel Belyayev (1925–1970) — (Soviet Union) Voskhod 2
- Georgi Beregovoi* (1921–1995) — (Soviet Union) Soyuz 3
- Anatoly Berezovoy (1942–2014) — (Soviet Union) Soyuz T-5/7
- Valentin Bondarenko (1937–1961) — (Soviet Union) No flights.
- Andrei Borisenko — (Russia) Soyuz TMA-21
- Konstantin Borisov — (Russia) SpaceX Crew-7
- Nikolai Budarin — (Russia) STS-71/Soyuz TM-21, Soyuz TM-27, STS-113/Soyuz TMA-1
- Valery Bykovsky (1934–2019) — (Soviet Union) Vostok 5, Soyuz 22, Soyuz 31/29

=== C ===
- Nikolai Chub — (Russia) Soyuz MS-24/MS-25 (2023-24)

=== D ===
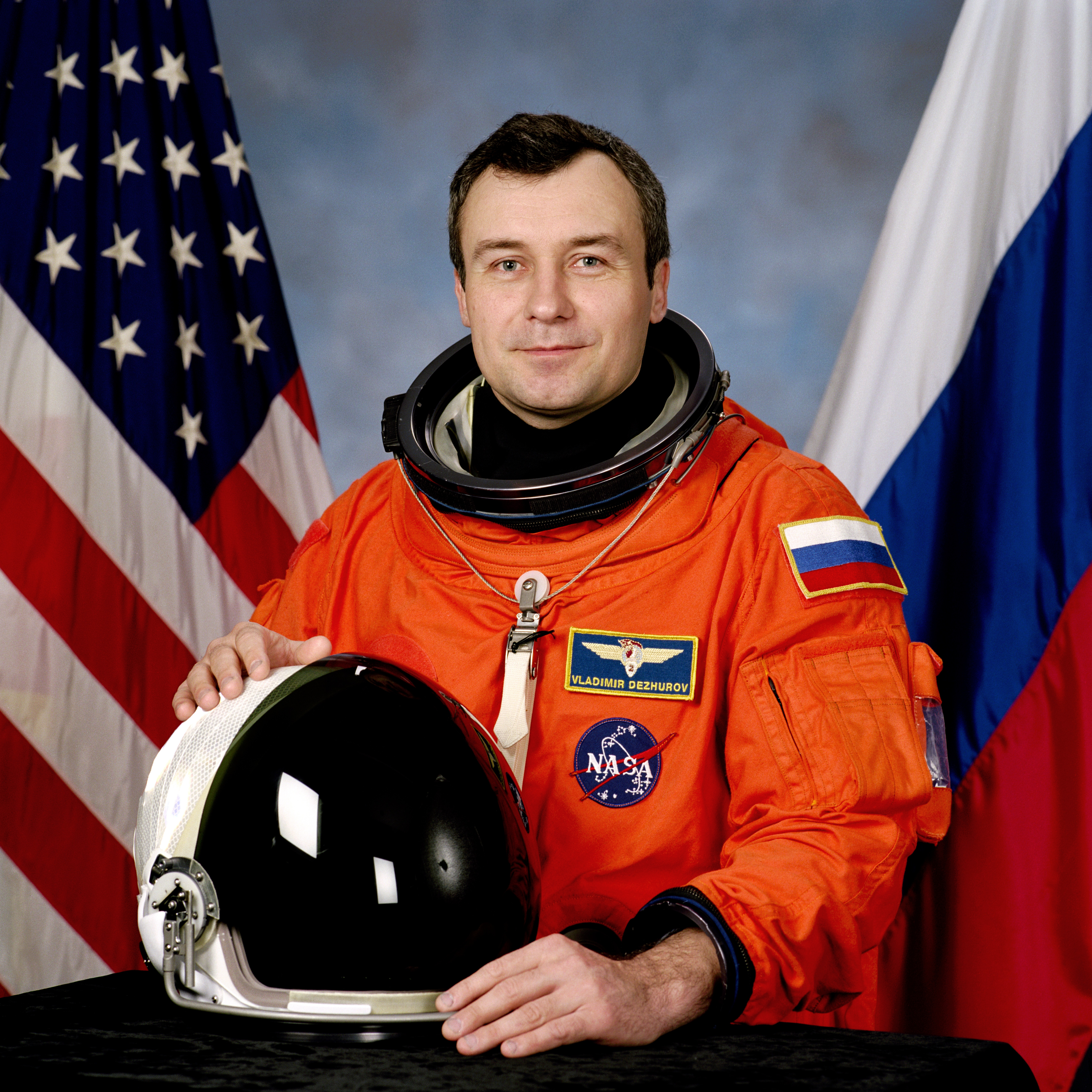
Vladimir Dezhurov

- Vladimir Dezhurov — (Russia) Soyuz TM-21/STS-71
- Georgy Dobrovolsky* (1928–1971), Died on reentry. — (Soviet Union) Soyuz 11
- Pyotr Dubrov — (Russia) Soyuz MS-18/Soyuz MS-19 (2021-22), Soyuz MS-29 (2026-27)
- Lev Dyomin (1926–1998) — (Soviet Union) Soyuz 15
- Vladimir Dzhanibekov* — (Soviet Union) Soyuz 27/26, Soyuz 39, Soyuz T-12, Soyuz T-13

=== F ===
- Andrey Fedyaev — (Russia) SpaceX Crew-6, SpaceX Crew-12
- Konstantin Feoktistov (1926–2009) — (Soviet Union) Voskhod 1
- Valentin Filatyev (1930–1990) — (Soviet Union) Expelled from Vostok program; no flights.
- Anatoly Filipchenko (1928–2022) — (Soviet Union) Soyuz 7, Soyuz 16

=== G ===
- Yuri Gagarin (1934–1968), First person in space. — (Soviet Union) Vostok 1
- Yuri Gidzenko* — (Russia) Soyuz TM-22, Soyuz TM-31/STS-102, Soyuz TM-34/Soyuz TM-33
- Yuri Glazkov (1939–2008) — (Soviet Union) Soyuz 24
- Viktor Gorbatko (1934–2017) — (Soviet Union) Soyuz 7, Soyuz 24, Soyuz 37/36
- Aleksandr Gorbunov — (Russia) SpaceX Crew-9
- Alexander Grebenkin — (Russia) SpaceX Crew-8
- Georgi Grechko (1931–2017) — (Soviet Union) Soyuz 17, Soyuz 26/27, Soyuz T-14/13
- Aleksei Gubarev (1931–2015) — (Soviet Union) Soyuz 17, Soyuz 28

=== I ===
- Aleksandr Ivanchenkov — (Soviet Union) Soyuz 29/31, Soyuz T-6,
- Anatoli Ivanishin — (Russia) Soyuz TMA-22, Soyuz MS-01, Soyuz MS-16,

=== K ===
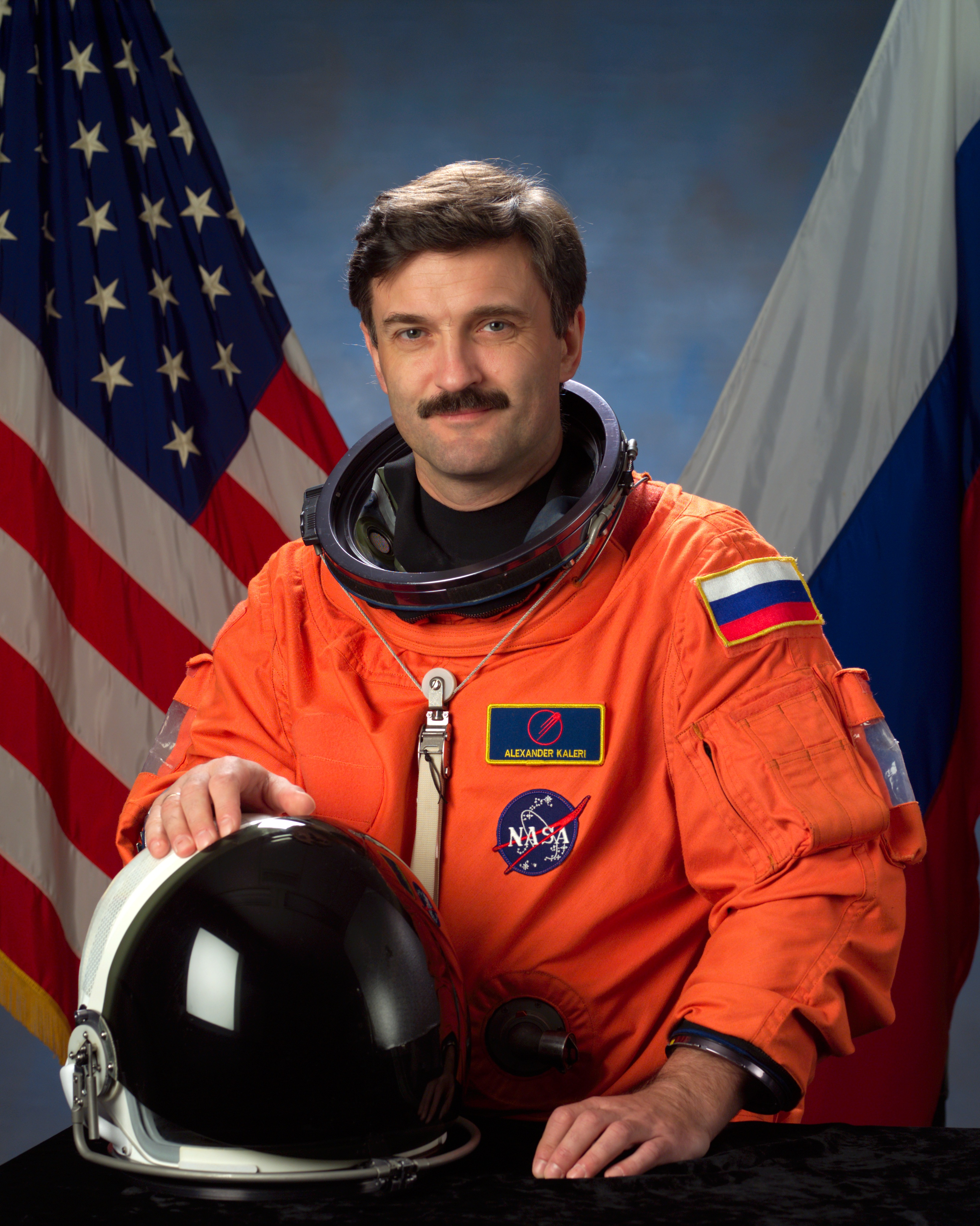
Aleksandr Kaleri

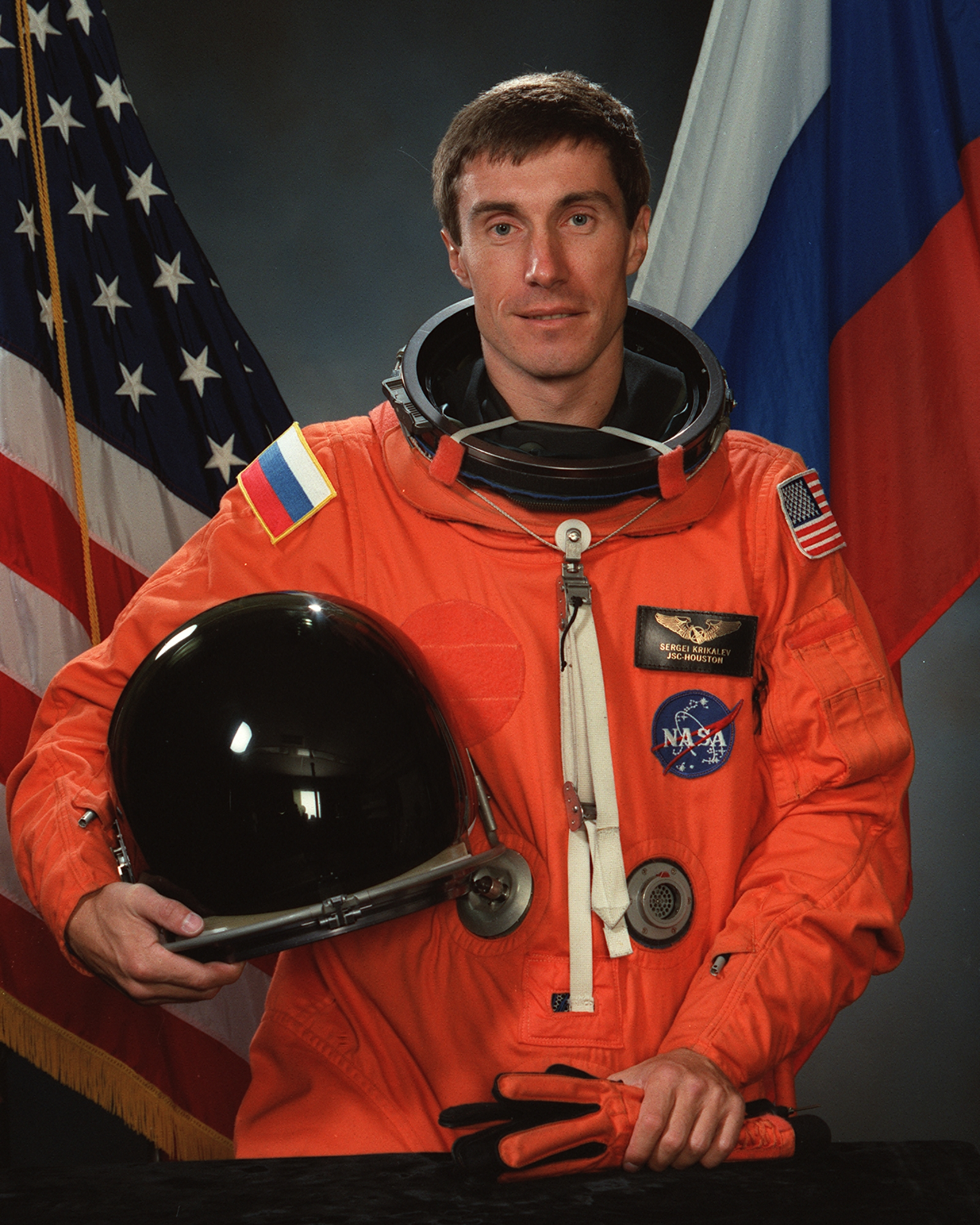
Sergei Krikalev

- Aleksandr Kaleri* — (Russia) Soyuz TM-14, Soyuz TM-24, Soyuz TM-30, Soyuz TMA-3, Soyuz TMA-01M
- Yevgeny Khrunov (1933–2000) — (Soviet Union) Soyuz 5/4
- Anna Kikina — (Russia) SpaceX Crew-5, Soyuz MS-29
- Leonid Kizim* (1941–2010) — (Soviet Union) Soyuz T-3, Soyuz T-10/11, Soyuz T-15
- Pyotr Klimuk* — (Soviet Union) Soyuz 13, Soyuz 18, Soyuz 30
- Vladimir Komarov (1927–1967), Died on reentry. — (Soviet Union) Voskhod 1, Soyuz 1
- Yelena V. Kondakova — (Russia) Soyuz TM-20/STS-84
- Dmitri Kondratyev — (Russia) Soyuz TMA-20
- Oleg Kononenko* — (Russia) Soyuz TMA-12, Soyuz TMA-03M, Soyuz TMA-17M, Soyuz MS-11, Soyuz MS-24/MS-25
- Mikhail Korniyenko — (Russia) Soyuz TMA-18, Soyuz TMA-16M/Soyuz TMA-18M
- Sergey Korsakov* — (Russia) Soyuz MS-21
- Valery Korzun — (Russia) Soyuz TM-24, STS-111/113
- Oleg Kotov* — (Russia) Soyuz TMA-10, Soyuz TMA-17, Soyuz TMA-10M
- Vladimir Kovalyonok* — (Soviet Union) Soyuz 25, Soyuz 29/31, Soyuz T-4
- Konstantin Kozeyev — (Russia) Soyuz TM-33/32
- Sergei Krikalev — (Soviet Union) Soyuz TM-7, Soyuz TM-12/ (Russia) Soyuz TM-13, STS-60, STS-88, Soyuz TM-31/STS-102, Soyuz TMA-6
- Valeri Kubasov (1935–2014) — (Soviet Union) Soyuz 6, Soyuz 19, Soyuz 36/35
- Sergey Kud-Sverchkov — (Russia) Soyuz MS-17, Soyuz MS-28

=== L ===
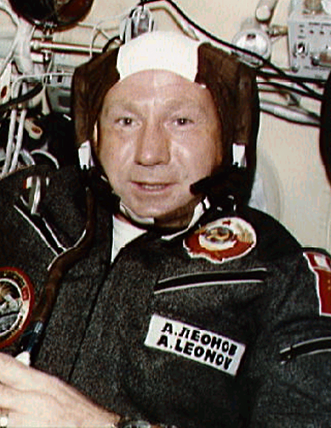
Alexei Leonov

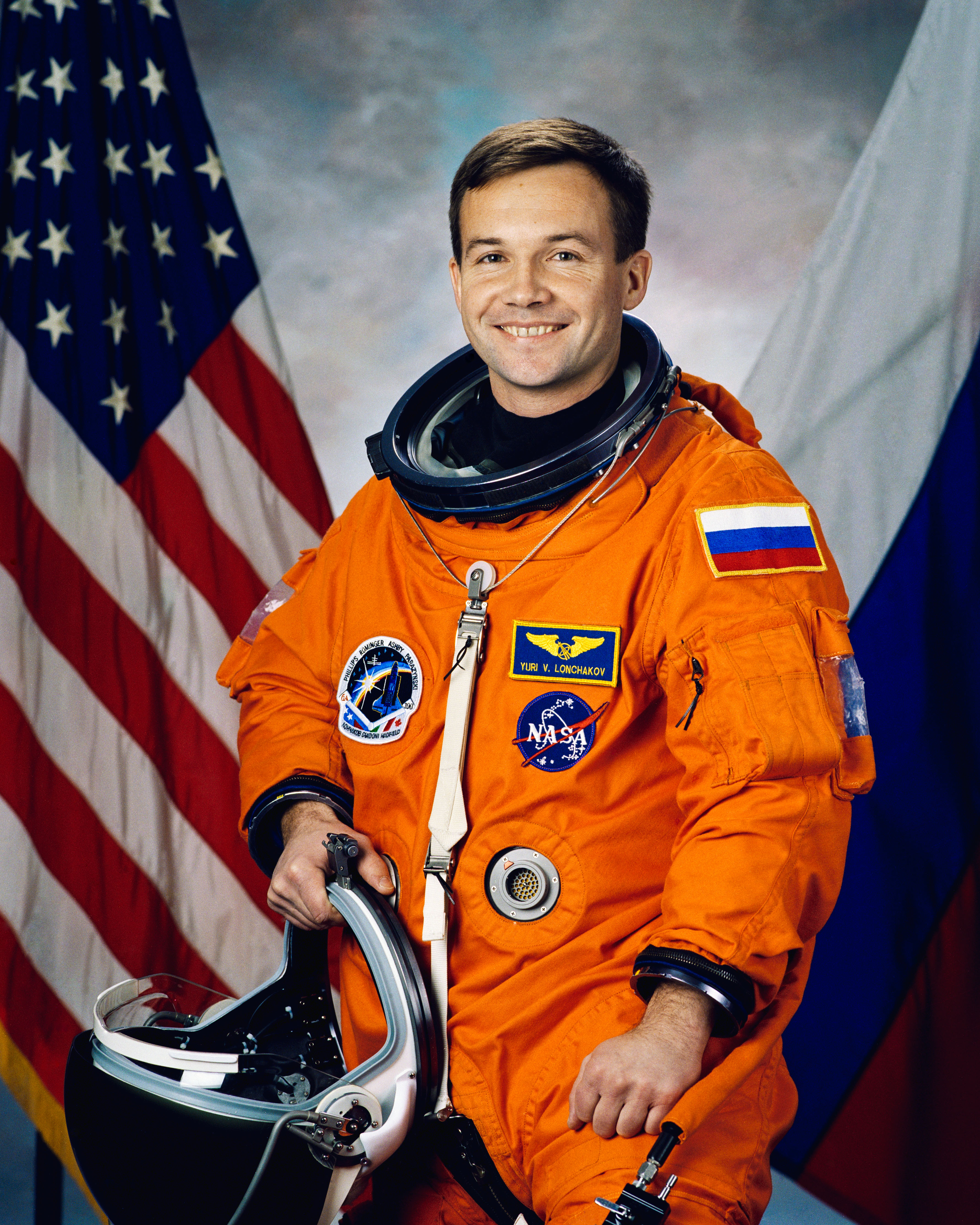
Yuri Lonchakov

- Aleksandr Laveykin — (Soviet Union) Soyuz TM-2
- Vasili Lazarev (1928–1990) — (Soviet Union) Soyuz 12, Soyuz 18a
- Aleksandr Lazutkin — (Russia) Soyuz TM-25
- Valentin Lebedev — (Soviet Union) Soyuz 13, Soyuz T-5/7
- Alexei Leonov (1934–2019) — (Soviet Union) Voskhod 2 (first walk in space), Soyuz 19
- Anatoli Levchenko* (1941–1988) — (Soviet Union) Soyuz TM-4/3
- Yuri Lonchakov* — (Russia) STS-100, Soyuz TMA-1/TM-34, Soyuz TMA-13
- Vladimir Lyakhov* (1941–2018) — (Soviet Union) Soyuz 32/34, Soyuz T-9, Soyuz TM-6/5

=== M ===
- Oleg Makarov (1933–2003) — (Soviet Union) Soyuz 12, Soyuz 18a, Soyuz 27/26, Soyuz T-3
- Yuri Malenchenko* — (Russia) Soyuz TM-19, STS-106, Soyuz TMA-2, Soyuz TMA-11, Soyuz TMA-05M, Soyuz TMA-19M,
- Yury Malyshev (1941–1999) — (Soviet Union) Soyuz T-2, Soyuz T-11/10
- Gennadi Manakov (1950–2019) — (Soviet Union) Soyuz TM-10, (Russia) Soyuz TM-16
- Musa Manarov* — (Soviet Union) Soyuz TM-4/6, Soyuz TM-11
- Denis Matveev — (Russia) Soyuz MS-21
- Sergey Mikayev — (Russia) Soyuz MS-28
- Alexander Misurkin — (Russia) Soyuz TMA-08M, Soyuz MS-06, Soyuz MS-20
- Boris Morukov (1950–2015) — (Russia) STS-106
- Talgat Musabayev* — (Russia) Soyuz TM-19, Soyuz TM-27, Soyuz TM-32/31

=== N ===
- Grigori Nelyubov (1934–1966) — (Soviet Union) Expelled from Vostok program, no flights.
- Andriyan Nikolayev (1929–2004) — (Soviet Union) Vostok 3, Soyuz 9
- Oleg Novitsky* — (Russia) Soyuz TMA-06M, Soyuz MS-03, Soyuz MS-18, Soyuz MS-25/MS-24

=== O ===
- Yuri Onufrienko* — (Russia) Soyuz TM-23, STS-108/111
- Aleksey Ovchinin — (Russia) Soyuz TMA-20M, Soyuz MS-10, Soyuz MS-12, Soyuz MS-26

=== P ===
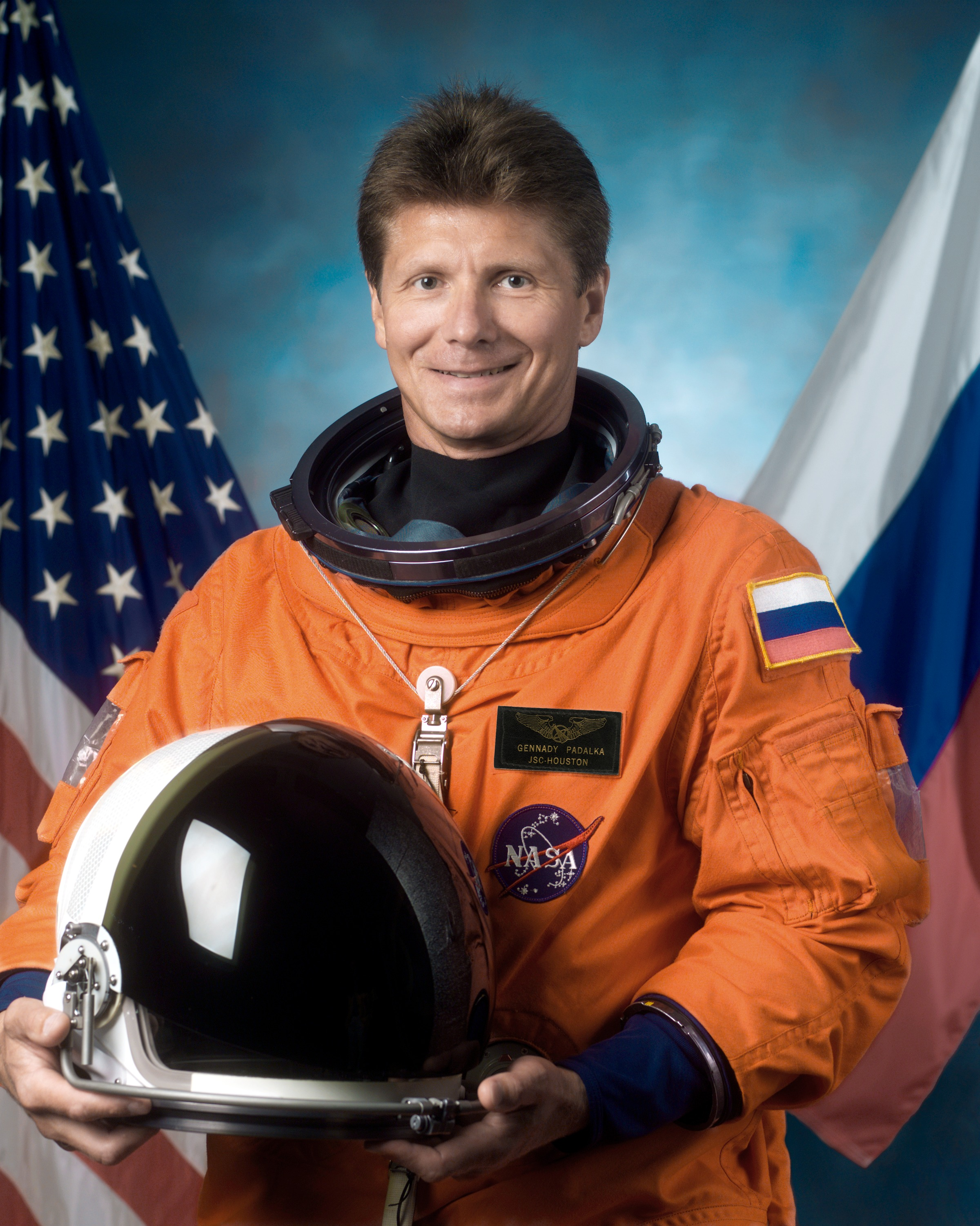
Gennady Padalka

- Gennady Padalka — (Russia) Soyuz TM-28, Soyuz TMA-4, Soyuz TMA-14, Soyuz TMA-04M, Soyuz TMA-16M
- Viktor Patsayev* (1933–1971), Died on reentry. — (Soviet Union) Soyuz 11
- Dmitry Petelin — (Russia) Soyuz MS-22/MS-23
- Oleg Platonov — (Russia) SpaceX Crew-11
- Aleksandr Poleshchuk — (Russia) Soyuz TM-16
- Yulia Peresild — (Russia) Soyuz MS-19
- Kirill Peskov — (Russia) SpaceX Crew-10
- Valeri Polyakov (1942–2022) — (Soviet Union) Soyuz TM-6/7, (Russia) Soyuz TM-18/20
- Leonid Popov* — (Soviet Union) Soyuz 35/37, Soyuz 40, Soyuz T-7/5
- Pavel Popovich* (1930–2009) — (Soviet Union) Vostok 4, Soyuz 14
- Sergey Prokopyev — (Russia) Soyuz MS-09, Soyuz MS-22/MS-23

=== R ===
- Sergei Revin — (Russia) Soyuz TMA-04M
- Roman Romanenko — (Russia) Soyuz TMA-15, Soyuz TMA-07M
- Yuri Romanenko — (Soviet Union) Soyuz 26/27, Soyuz 38, Soyuz TM-2/3
- Valery Rozhdestvensky (1939–2011) — (Soviet Union) Soyuz 23
- Nikolai Rukavishnikov (1932–2002) — (Soviet Union) Soyuz 10, Soyuz 16, Soyuz 33
- Sergei Ryazanski — (Russia) Soyuz TMA-10M, Soyuz MS-05
- Valery Ryumin (1939–2022) — (Soviet Union) Soyuz 25, Soyuz 32/34, Soyuz 35/37, (Russia) STS-91
- Sergei Ryzhikov — (Russia) Soyuz MS-02, Soyuz MS-17, Soyuz MS-27

=== S ===
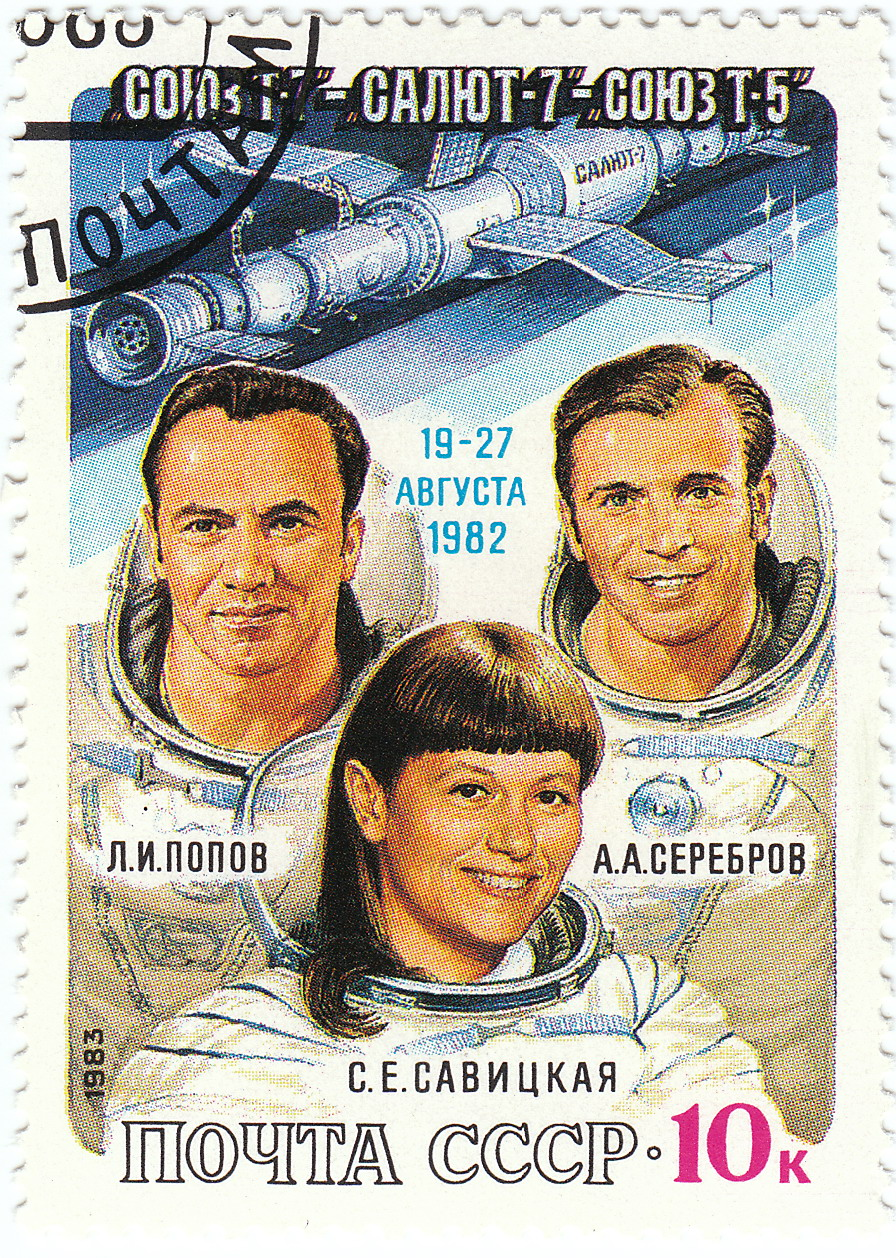
Leonid Popov, Svetlana Savitskaya, Aleksandr Serebrov

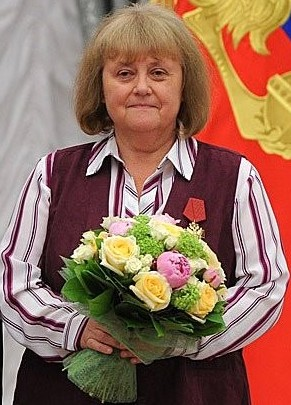
Svetlana Savitskaya

- Aleksandr Samokutyayev — (Russia) Soyuz TMA-21, Soyuz TMA-14M
- Gennadi Sarafanov (1942–2005) — (Soviet Union) Soyuz 15
- Viktor Savinykh — (Soviet Union) Soyuz T-4, Soyuz T-13/14, Soyuz TM-3,
- Svetlana Savitskaya — (Soviet Union) Soyuz T-7/5, Soyuz T-12
- Aleksandr Serebrov (1944–2013) — (Soviet Union) Soyuz T-7/5, Soyuz T-8, Soyuz TM-8, (Russia) Soyuz TM-17
- Yelena Serova — (Russia) Soyuz TMA-14M
- Vitali Sevastyanov (1935–2010) — (Soviet Union) Soyuz 9, Soyuz 18
- Yuri Shargin — (Russia) Soyuz TMA-5/4
- Salizhan Sharipov* — (Russia) STS-89, Soyuz TMA-5
- Vladimir Shatalov* (1927–2021) — (Soviet Union) Soyuz 4, Soyuz 8, Soyuz 10
- Klim Shipenko — (Russia) Soyuz MS-19
- Anton Shkaplerov — (Russia) Soyuz TMA-22, Soyuz TMA-15M, Soyuz MS-07, Soyuz MS-19
- Georgi Shonin* (1935–1997) — (Soviet Union) Soyuz 6
- Oleg Skripochka — (Russia) Soyuz TMA-01M, Soyuz TMA-20M, Soyuz MS-15
- Aleksandr Skvortsov — (Russia) Soyuz TMA-18, Soyuz TMA-12M, Soyuz MS-13
- Anatoly Solovyev* — (Soviet Union) Soyuz TM-5/4, Soyuz TM-9, (Russia) Soyuz TM-15, STS-71/Soyuz TM-21, Soyuz TM-26
- Vladimir Solovyov — (Soviet Union) Soyuz T-10/11, Soyuz T-15
- Gennadi Strekalov (1940–2004) — (Soviet Union) Soyuz T-3, Soyuz T-8, Soyuz T-11/10, Soyuz TM-10, (Russia) Soyuz TM-21/STS-71
- Maksim Surayev — (Russia) Soyuz TMA-16, Soyuz TMA-13M

=== T ===
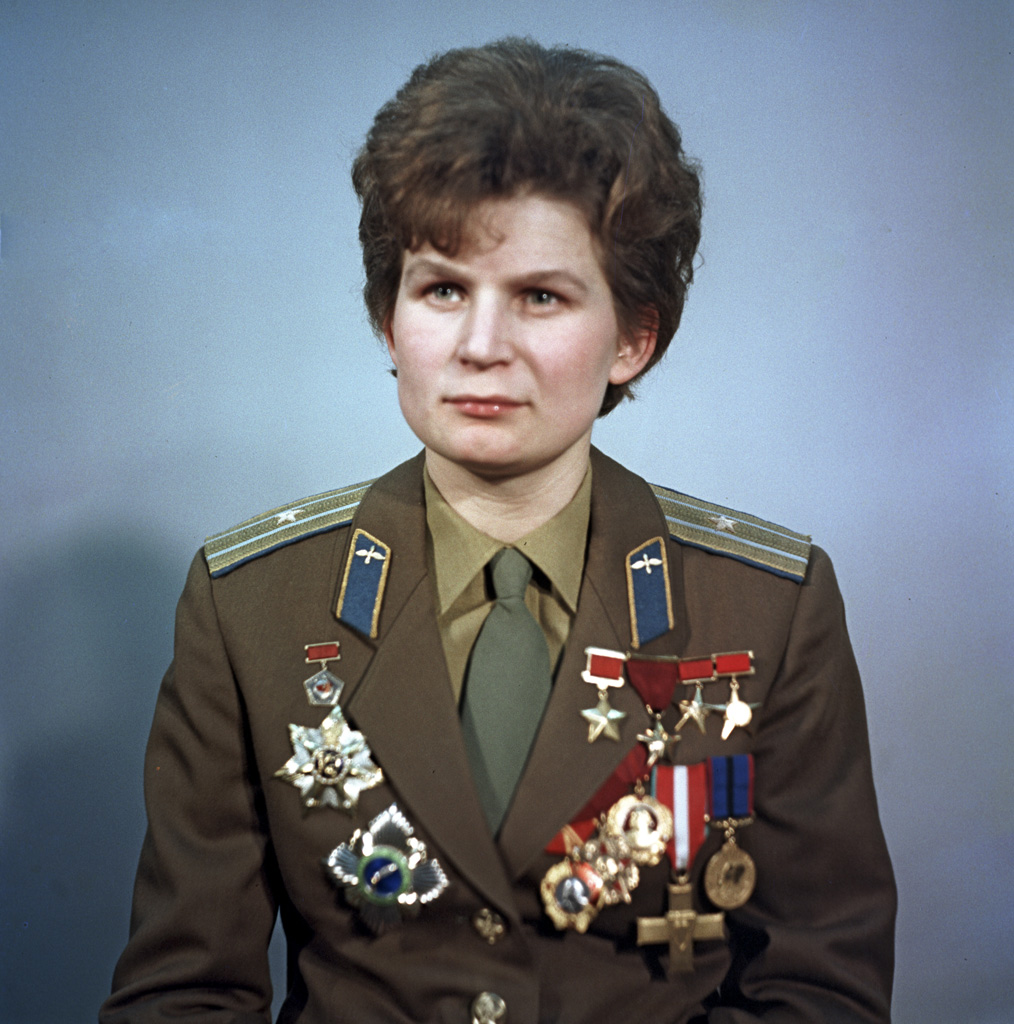
Valentina Tereshkova

- Yevgeni Tarelkin — (Russia) Soyuz TMA-06M
- Valentina Tereshkova, First woman in space. — (Soviet Union) Vostok 6
- Gherman Titov (1935–2000) — (Soviet Union) Vostok 2
- Vladimir Titov — (Soviet Union) Soyuz T-8, Soyuz TM-4/6, (Russia) STS-63, STS-86
- Valeri Tokarev — (Russia) STS-96, Soyuz TMA-7
- Sergei Treshchov — (Russia) STS-111/113
- Vasili Tsibliyev* — (Russia) Soyuz TM-17, Soyuz TM-25
- Mikhail Tyurin — (Russia) STS-105/108, Soyuz TMA-9, Soyuz TMA-11M

=== U ===
- Yuri Usachov — (Russia) Soyuz TM-18, Soyuz TM-23, STS-101, STS-102/STS-105

=== V ===
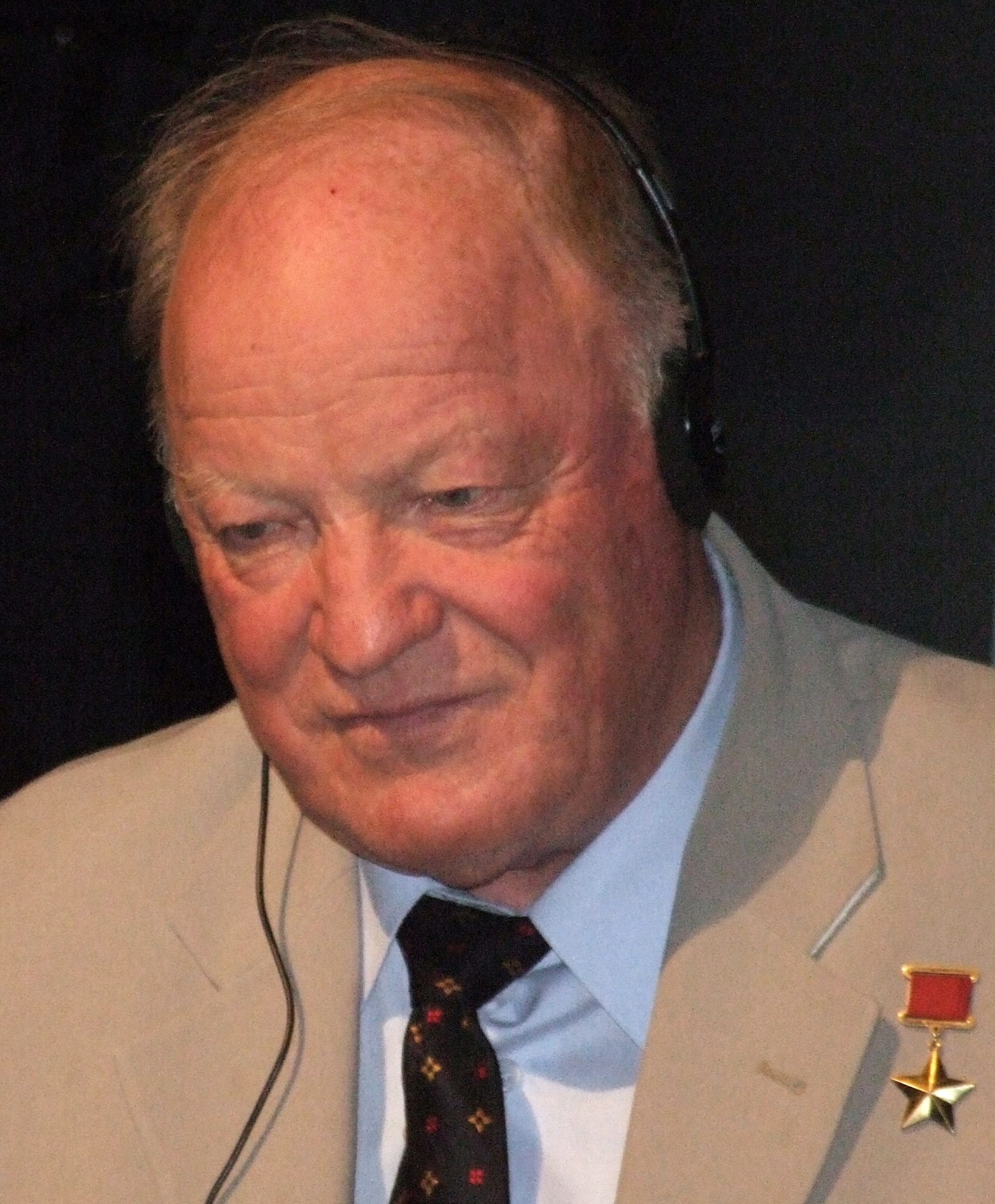
Igor Volk

- Vladimir Vasyutin* (1952–2002) — (Soviet Union) Soyuz T-14
- Ivan Vagner (Russia) Soyuz MS-16, Soyuz MS-26
- Aleksandr Viktorenko* (1947–2023) — (Soviet Union) Soyuz TM-3/2, Soyuz TM-8, (Russia) Soyuz TM-14, Soyuz TM-20
- Pavel Vinogradov — (Russia) Soyuz TM-26, Soyuz TMA-8, Soyuz TMA-08M
- Igor Volk* (1937–2017) — (Soviet Union) Soyuz T-12
- Alexander Volkov* — (Soviet Union) Soyuz T-14, Soyuz TM-7, Soyuz TM-13, (Russia) Soyuz TM-13
- Sergei Aleksandrovich Volkov* — (Russia) Soyuz TMA-12, Soyuz TMA-02M
- Vladislav Volkov (1935–1971), Died on reentry. — (Soviet Union) Soyuz 7, Soyuz 11
- Boris Volynov — (Soviet Union) Soyuz 5, Soyuz 21
- Sergei Vozovikov (1958–1993), drowned during survival training program — (Russia) No flights.

=== Y ===
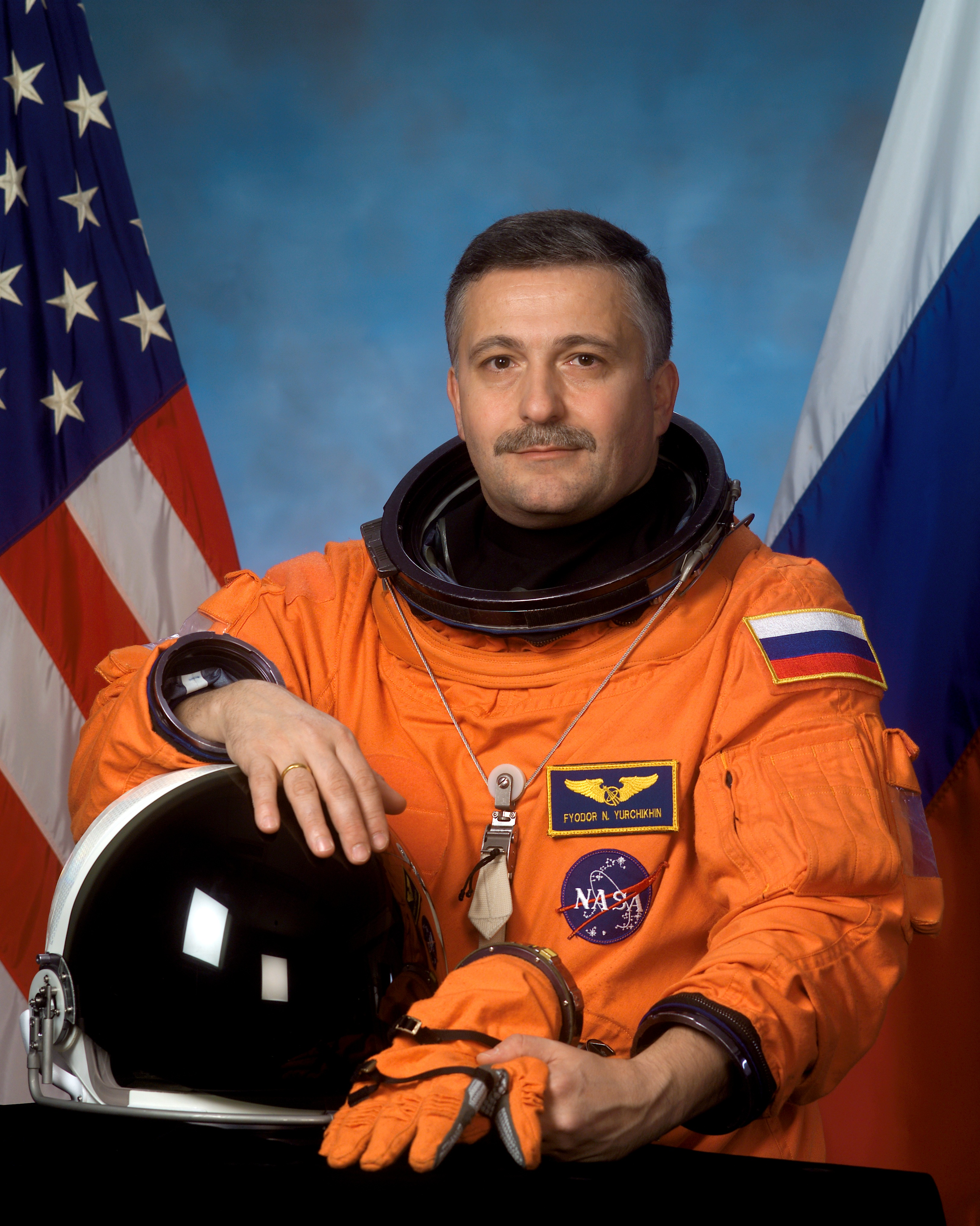
Fyodor Yurchikhin

- Boris Yegorov (1937–1994) — (Soviet Union) Voskhod 1
- Aleksei Yeliseyev — (Soviet Union) Soyuz 5/4, Soyuz 8, Soyuz 10
- Fyodor Yurchikhin* — (Russia) STS-112, Soyuz TMA-10, Soyuz TMA-19, Soyuz TMA-09M, Soyuz MS-04

=== Z ===
- Dmitri Zaikin (1932–2013) — (Soviet Union) No flights.
- Sergei Zalyotin — (Russia) Soyuz TM-30, Soyuz TMA-1/TM-34
- Vitali Zholobov* — (Soviet Union) Soyuz 21
- Alexey Zubritsky* — (Russia) Soyuz MS-27
- Vyacheslav Zudov (1942–2024) — (Soviet Union) Soyuz 23

== Eastern Bloc cosmonauts ==
From 1978–1988, the Soviet Union transported 11 citizens of 10 nations closely allied to the USSR in the Soyuz crewed vehicle. All of them flew as a result of the Interkosmos program. These space travelers have usually been referred to as "cosmonauts".

- Afghanistan: Abdul Ahad Mohmand — Soyuz TM-6/5
- Bulgaria:
  - Aleksandar Panayotov Aleksandrov — Soyuz TM-5/4
  - Georgi Ivanov — Soyuz 33
- Cuba: Arnaldo Tamayo Méndez — Soyuz 38
- Czechoslovakia: Vladimír Remek — Soyuz 28
- East Germany: Sigmund Jähn (1937–2019) — Soyuz 31/29
- Hungary: Bertalan Farkas — Soyuz 36/35
- Mongolia: Jügderdemidiin Gürragchaa — Soyuz 39
- Poland: Mirosław Hermaszewski (1941–2022) — Soyuz 30
- Romania: Dumitru Prunariu — Soyuz 40
- Vietnam: Phạm Tuân — Soyuz 37/36

== Other cosmonauts ==
In 1982, as an extension of the Intercosmos program, the Soviet Union began to fly the citizens of countries not part of the Soviet bloc, starting with Jean-Loup Chrétien of France. The USSR and later Russia have transported 49 citizens of 18 other nations on the Soyuz vehicle, usually as part of a commercial arrangement, including seven space tourists flying through the Space Adventures contract. Since 2001, the Soyuz has been used to transport ESA, JAXA, and NASA astronauts to the International Space Station. These space travelers are not always referred to as "cosmonauts", especially if they belong to another space program; e.g., NASA employees are almost always referred to as "astronauts", even if they are flying on a Russian vehicle.

=== Africa ===
- South Africa: Mark Shuttleworth (Space Adventures) — Soyuz TM-34/33

=== Americas ===
- Brazil: Marcos Pontes — Soyuz TMA-8
- Canada:
  - Guy Laliberté (Space Adventures) — Soyuz TMA-16/14
  - Chris Hadfield — Soyuz TMA-07M
  - Robert Thirsk — Soyuz TMA-15
- United States:
  - Joseph M. Acaba — Soyuz TMA-04M
  - Anousheh Ansari* (Space Adventures) — Soyuz TMA-9/8
  - Michael R. Barratt — Soyuz TMA-14
  - Ken Bowersox — Soyuz TMA-1 (landing only)
  - Daniel C. Burbank — Soyuz TMA-22
  - Leroy Chiao — Soyuz TMA-5
  - Timothy Creamer — Soyuz TMA-17
  - Tracy Caldwell Dyson — Soyuz TMA-18
  - Catherine Coleman — Soyuz TMA-20
  - Michael Fincke — Soyuz TMA-4, Soyuz TMA-13
  - Michael Foale* — Soyuz TMA-3
  - Kevin A. Ford — Soyuz TMA-06M
  - Michael E. Fossum — Soyuz TMA-02M
  - Ronald J. Garan, Jr. — Soyuz TMA-21
  - Richard Garriott* (Space Adventures) — Soyuz TMA-13/12
  - Michael S. Hopkins — Soyuz TMA-10M
  - Scott Kelly — Soyuz TMA-01M, Soyuz TMA-16M
  - Kjell N. Lindgren — Soyuz TMA-17M
  - Michael Lopez-Alegria* — Soyuz TMA-9
  - Ed Lu — Soyuz TMA-2
  - Thomas Marshburn — Soyuz TMA-07M
  - Richard Mastracchio — Soyuz TMA-11M
  - William S. McArthur — Soyuz TMA-7
  - Karen Nyberg — Soyuz TMA-09M
  - Gregory Olsen (Space Adventures) — Soyuz TMA-7/6
  - Donald Pettit — Soyuz TMA-1 (landing only), Soyuz TMA-03M
  - John L. Phillips — Soyuz TMA-6
  - William Shepherd — Soyuz TM-31 (launch only)
  - Charles Simonyi* (Space Adventures) — Soyuz TMA-10/9, Soyuz TMA-14/13
  - Norman Thagard — Soyuz TM-21 (launch only)
  - Dennis Tito (Space Adventures) — Soyuz TM-32/31
  - Terry W. Virts — Soyuz TMA-15M
  - Shannon Walker — Soyuz TMA-19
  - Douglas H. Wheelock — Soyuz TMA-19
  - Peggy Whitson — Soyuz TMA-11
  - Jeffrey Williams — Soyuz TMA-8, Soyuz TMA-16
  - Sunita Williams — Soyuz TMA-05M
  - Barry E. Wilmore — Soyuz TMA-14M
  - Reid Wiseman — Soyuz TMA-13M

=== Asia ===
- India: Rakesh Sharma (Intercosmos) — Soyuz T-11/10
- Japan:
  - Toyohiro Akiyama — Soyuz TM-11/10
  - Akihiko Hoshide — Soyuz TMA-05M
  - Soichi Noguchi — Soyuz TMA-17
  - Satoshi Furukawa — Soyuz TMA-02M
  - Koichi Wakata — Soyuz TMA-11M
  - Kimiya Yui — Soyuz TMA-17M
- Malaysia: Sheikh Muszaphar Shukor — Soyuz TMA-11/10
- South Korea: Yi So-yeon — Soyuz TMA-12/11
- Syria: Muhammed Faris (Intercosmos) — Soyuz TM-3/2

=== Europe ===
- Austria: Franz Viehböck — Soyuz TM-13/12
- Belgium: Frank De Winne, EAC — Soyuz TMA-1/TM-34, Soyuz TMA-15
- France:
  - Jean-Loup Chrétien, CNES (Intercosmos) — Soyuz T-6, Soyuz TM-7/6
  - Léopold Eyharts, EAC — Soyuz TM-27/26
  - Claudie André-Deshays Haigneré, EAC — Soyuz TM-24/23, Soyuz TM-33/32
  - Jean-Pierre Haigneré, EAC — Soyuz TM-17/16, Soyuz TM-29
  - Michel Tognini, EAC — Soyuz TM-15/14
- Germany:
  - Reinhold Ewald, EAC — Soyuz TM-25/24
  - Klaus-Dietrich Flade — Soyuz TM-14/13
  - Alexander Gerst — Soyuz TMA-13M
  - Ulf Merbold, EAC — Soyuz TM-20/19
  - Thomas Reiter, EAC — Soyuz TM-22
- Italy:
  - Samantha Cristoforetti, EAC — Soyuz TMA-15M
  - Roberto Vittori, EAC — Soyuz TM-34/33, Soyuz TMA-6/5
  - Paolo Nespoli, EAC — Soyuz TMA-20
  - Luca Parmitano, EAC — Soyuz TMA-09M
- The Netherlands: André Kuipers, EAC — Soyuz TMA-4/3, Soyuz TMA-03M
- Slovakia: Ivan Bella — Soyuz TM-29/28
- Spain: Pedro Duque, EAC — Soyuz TMA-3/2
- United Kingdom:
  - Helen Sharman — Soyuz TM-12/11
  - Timothy Peake, EAC — Soyuz TMA-19M

== Soviet and Russian cosmonauts born outside Russia ==
All Soviet and RKA cosmonauts have been born within the borders of the U.S.S.R.; no cosmonaut who was born in independent Russia has yet flown. Many cosmonauts, however, were born in Soviet territories outside the boundaries of Russia, and may be claimed by various Soviet successor states as nationals of those states. All claimed Soviet or Russian citizenship at the time of their space flights.

=== Azerbaidzhan S.S.R. / Azerbaijan ===
- Musa Manarov, born in Baku, Azerbaijan (Soviet Union)

=== Byelorussian S.S.R. / Belarus ===
- Pyotr Klimuk, born in Komarovka, Belarus (Soviet Union)
- Vladimir Kovalyonok, born in Beloye, Belarus (Soviet Union)
- Oleg Novitski, born in Chervyen', Belarus (Russia)

=== Georgian S.S.R. / Georgia ===
- Fyodor Yurchikhin, born in Batumi, Georgia (Russia)

=== Kazakh S.S.R. / Kazakhstan ===
- Toktar Aubakirov, born in Karaganda, Kazakhstan (Soviet Union)
- Yuri Lonchakov, born in Balkhash, Kazakhstan (Russia)
- Talgat Musabayev, born in Kargaly, Kazakhstan (Russia)
- Viktor Patsayev (1933—1971), born in Aktyubinsk, Kazakhstan (Soviet Union)
- Dmitry Petelin, born in Kustanai, Kazakhstan
- Vladimir Shatalov (1927—2021), born in Petropavlovsk, Kazakhstan (Soviet Union)
- Aleksandr Viktorenko (1947–2023), born in Olginka, Kazakhstan (Soviet Union) (Russia)

=== Kirghiz S.S.R. / Kyrgyzstan ===
- Salizhan Sharipov, born in Uzgen, Kyrgyzstan (Russia)
- Sergey Korsakov, born in Krunze, Kyrgyzstan (Russia)

=== Latvian S.S.R. / Latvia ===
- Aleksandr Kaleri, born in Jūrmala, Latvia (Russia)
- Anatoly Solovyev, born in Riga, Latvia (Soviet Union) (Russia)
- Oleg Artemyev, born in Riga, Latvia (Soviet Union) (Russia)

=== Turkmen S.S.R. / Turkmenistan ===
- Oleg Kononenko, born in Chardzhou, Turkmenistan (Russia)

=== Ukrainian S.S.R. / Ukraine ===
- Anatoly Artsebarsky, born in Prosyana, Ukraine (Soviet Union)
- Georgi Beregovoi (1921–1995), born in Federivka, Ukraine (Soviet Union)
- Georgiy Dobrovolskiy (1928–1971), born in Odessa, Ukraine (Soviet Union)
- Yuri Gidzenko, born in Yelanets, Ukraine
- Leonid Kizim (1941–2010), born in Krasnyi Lyman, Ukraine (Soviet Union)
- Oleg Kotov, born in Simferopol, Ukraine
- Anatoli Levchenko (1941–1988), born in Krasnokutsk, Ukraine (Soviet Union)
- Vladimir Lyakhov (1941–2018), born in Antratsyt, Ukraine (Soviet Union)
- Yuri Malenchenko, born in Svitlovodsk, Ukraine
- Yuri Onufriyenko, born in Ryasne, Ukraine
- Leonid Popov, born in Oleksandriia, Ukraine (Soviet Union)
- Pavel Popovich (1930–2009), born in Uzyn, Ukraine. (Soviet Union)
- Georgi Shonin (1935–1997), born in Rovenky, Ukraine (Soviet Union)
- Vasili Tsibliyev, born in Horikhivka, Ukraine
- Vladimir Vasyutin (1952–2002), born in Kharkiv, Ukraine (Soviet Union)
- Igor Volk (1937–2017), born in Zmiiv, Ukraine (Soviet Union)
- Aleksandr Volkov, born in Horlivka, Ukraine (Soviet Union)
- Sergei Aleksandrovich Volkov, born in Chuhuiv, Ukraine
- Vitali Zholobov, born in Zburyivka, Ukraine (Soviet Union)
- Alexey Zubritsky, born in Zaporizhzhia, Ukraine

=== Uzbek S.S.R. / Uzbekistan ===
- Vladimir Dzhanibekov, born in Iskandar, Uzbekistan (Soviet Union)

== See also ==
- List of Russian aviators
- List of Russian explorers
- List of Russian inventors
- List of Soviet human spaceflight missions
- List of Russian human spaceflight missions
