= Out of the Present =

1995 film by Andrei Ujică

- Directed by: Andrei Ujică
- Written by: Andrei Ujică
- Produced by: Elke Peters
- Starring: Sergei Krikalev; Anatoly Artsebarsky; Alexander Volkov
- Cinematography: Vadim Yusov
- Edited by: Ralf Henninger; Heidi Leihbecher
- Distributed by: Real Fiction Filmverleih (Köln)
- Release date: 1995
- Running time: 96 minutes
- Country: Germany

Out of the Present is a 1995 documentary film by Andrei Ujică that deals with the prolonged stay of the Russian cosmonaut Sergei Krikalev at space station Mir. This was the first time a 35 mm film camera was used in space.

== Synopsis ==
The film begins with the May 1992 docking of Soyuz TM-12 at the station. For 92 minutes (the time for one Earth-orbit of the station) the routine of a long-term space station crew is shown, frequently interrupted by panoramic Earth views in addition to observing the day-to-day activities of eating, exercising and conducting experiments in weightlessness. Krikalev was a bystander to the collapse of the Soviet Union during his 10-month stay.

The arrival of Soyuz TM-13 is a highlight, while the station was crowded with five cosmonauts for a week. Due to the then-current political situation in Kazakhstan, a Kazakh cosmonaut, Toktar Aubakirov, had been selected for this mission. Without long-term training he was unable to relieve Krikalev, who therefore had to stay another six months at the station. Finally, Krikalev is shown back on Earth, resting on a couch after more than 300 days in zero gravity.

== Production ==
The filming was handled mainly by the long-term crews of the Mir. It is said that simply transporting the film camera used up roughly half of the film's budget.
