= Soyuz TM-13 =

1991 Soviet/Russian crewed spaceflight to Mir

- COSPAR ID: 1991-069A
- SATCAT no.: 21735
- Mission duration: 175 days, 2 hours, 51 minutes, 44 seconds
- Orbits completed: ~2,730

Spacecraft properties
- Spacecraft: Soyuz 7K-STM No. 63
- Spacecraft type: Soyuz-TM
- Manufacturer: NPO Energia
- Launch mass: 7,150 kilograms (15,760 lb)

Crew
- Crew size: 3
- Members: Alexander Volkov
- Launching: Toktar Aubakirov; Franz Viehböck
- Landing: Sergei Krikalev; Klaus-Dietrich Flade
- Callsign: Донба́сс (Donbass)

Start of mission
- Launch date: 2 October 1991, 05:59:38 UTC
- Rocket: Soyuz-U2
- Launch site: Baikonur Cosmodrome

End of mission
- Landing date: 25 March 1992, 08:51:22 UTC
- Landing site: near Dzhezkazgan

Orbital parameters
- Reference system: Geocentric
- Regime: Low Earth
- Perigee altitude: 195 kilometres (121 mi)
- Apogee altitude: 232 kilometres (144 mi)
- Inclination: 51.7 degrees
- Period: 92.4 minutes

Docking with Mir
- Docking date: 4 October 1991, 07:38:42 UTC
- Undocking date: 25 March 1992, 05:29:03 UTC
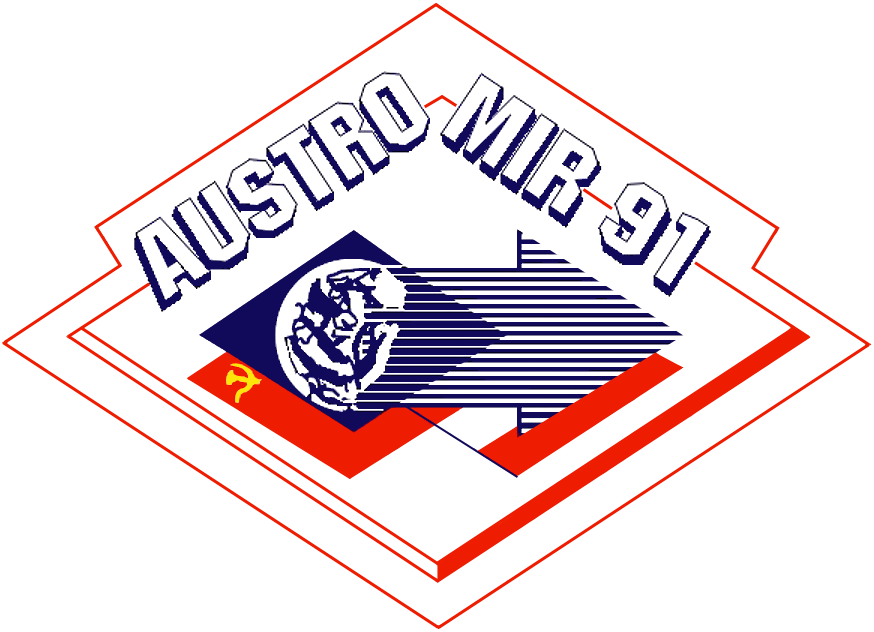
- Soyuz programme (Crewed missions)

Soyuz TM-13 was the 13th expedition to the Mir space station. Launched from the Soviet Union in October 1991 and lasting until March 1992, the mission included cosmonauts from Austria and the Kazakh Soviet Socialist Republic (Kazakh SSR), the latter of which became an independent state during the mission due to the dissolution of the Soviet Union in December 1991. The launch ceremony at the Baikonur Cosmodrome in Baikonur, Kazakh SSR was attended by the Soviet Premier Ivan Silaev, the President of the Kazakh SSR Nursultan Nazarbayev, and the Chancellor of Austria Franz Vranitzky. Before the launch, for the first time, President Nazarbayev received the launch report from cosmonaut Tokhtar Aubakirov in the Kazakh language.

== Crew ==
Position	Launching crew	Landing crew
Commander	Alexander Volkov; Third and last spaceflight	
Research cosmonaut/Flight engineer	Toktar Aubakirov, Kazakhstan; Only spaceflight	Sergei Krikalev; Second spaceflight
Research cosmonaut	Franz Viehböck, Austria; Only spaceflight	Klaus-Dietrich Flade, DLR; Only spaceflight

== Mission highlights ==
Soyuz-TM 13 carried commander Alexander Volkov along with Austrian cosmonaut-researcher Franz Viehböck and Soviet-Kazakh cosmonaut-researcher Toktar Aubakirov. The flight was unusual for carrying no flight engineer. Veteran Russian cosmonaut Alexandr Volkov commanded. The Austrians paid $7 million to fly Viehböck to Mir, and the Kazakh cosmonaut flew partly in an effort to encourage the then-Kazakh SSR to continue to permit launchings from Baikonur Cosmodrome. The cosmonaut-researchers photographed their respective countries from orbit and conducted the usual range of materials processing and medical experiments. Artsebarsky and Viehböck returned to Earth in Soyuz TM-12, with Volkov remaining on board Mir for an extended mission.

The Soyuz spent a total of 175 days docked to the Mir space station.

The Soyuz returned from Mir with German Klaus-Dietrich Flade and Krikalev and Volkov, dubbed by some as "the last citizens of the USSR" because they had launched from the Kazakh Soviet Socialist Republic within the USSR, and landed in what had since become the independent Republic of Kazakhstan.

== In popular culture ==
Out of the Present, a 1995 film documentary focused on Soyuz TM-12 cosmonaut Sergei Krikalev's stay on Mir, features the arrival of Soyuz TM-13.

== See also ==
- Timeline of astronauts by nationality
- List of astronauts by name
- Austromir-91
