= Franz Viehböck =

Austrian engineer and cosmonaut (born 1960)

- Born: 24 August 1960 (age 66); Vienna, Austria
- Occupation: Electrical engineer
- Space career

ASA astronaut
- Time in space: 7d 22h 12m
- Selection: 1989
- Missions: Soyuz TM-13, Soyuz TM-12

Franz Artur Viehböck (born 24 August 1960 in Vienna) is an Austrian electrical engineer and cosmonaut, who became the first Austrian to fly in space. He visited the Mir space station in 1991 aboard Soyuz TM-13, returning aboard Soyuz TM-12 after spending just over a week in space.

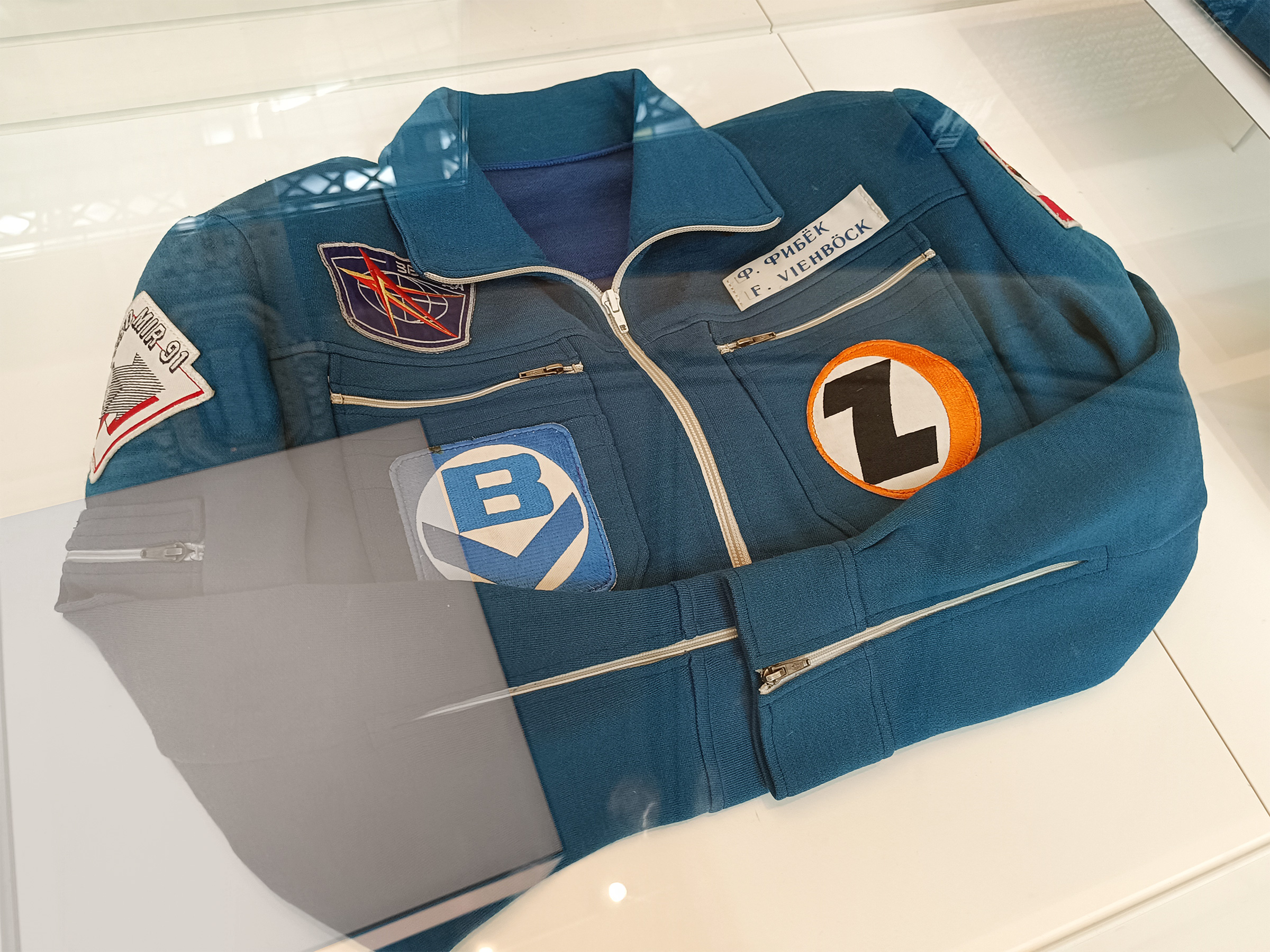
Jacket worn by Franz Viehböck on board the Mir space station.

== Career ==
Together with Clemens Lothaller, he was selected for the Soviet-Austrian space project Austromir 91. After two years of training he was chosen for the mission, and launched on 2 October 1991 together with the Russian cosmonauts Alexander A. Volkov and the Kazakh Toktar Aubakirov in Soyuz TM-13 from the Baikonur Cosmodrome spaceport.

At the Mir space station he conducted 15 experiments in the fields of space medicine, physics, and space technology, together with the cosmonauts Anatoly Artsebarsky and Sergey Krikalev. Viehböck returned after 7 days and 22 hours with Soyuz TM-12, and landed in Kazakhstan on 10 October.

The following two years he gave numerous lectures on the mission, then went to the United States and worked for Rockwell. When Rockwell was taken over by Boeing he became Director for International Business Development in Vienna. Later he was assigned Technologiebeauftragter (technology coordinator) of Lower Austria.

Viehböck resides in Berndorf, Lower Austria. He is married, with his daughter Carina being born during his space mission. Only two other space travellers became parents while on orbit: Mike Fincke and Randolph Bresnik (NASA).

== See also ==
- Timeline of astronauts by nationality
- List of astronauts by name
- Austromir-91
