= Sergei Krikalev =

Soviet and Russian cosmonaut (born 1958)

- Сергей Крикалёв
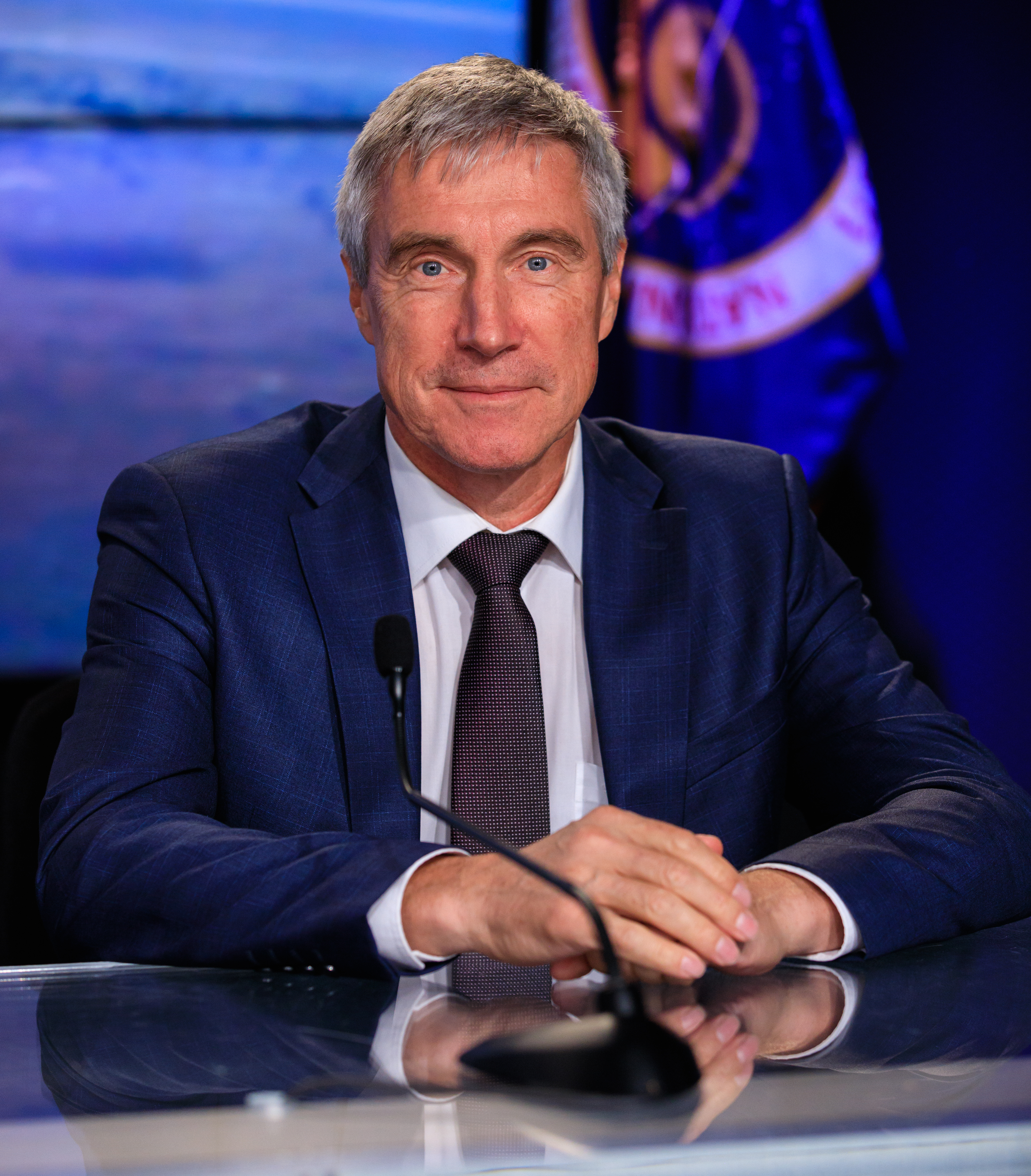
- Krikalev in 2022
- Born: 27 August 1958 (age 68); Leningrad, Russian SFSR, Soviet Union
- Occupation: Mechanical engineer
- Awards: Hero of the Soviet Union; Hero of the Russian Federation; Order of Lenin; Legion of Honour (France); NASA Distinguished Public Service Medal; NASA Space Flight Medal
- Space career

Roscosmos cosmonaut
- Status: Retired
- Time in space: 803 days, 9 hours, 39 minutes
- Selection: NPOE–7 Cosmonaut Group (1985)
- Total EVAs: 8
- Total EVA time: 41 hours, 8 minutes
- Missions: Soyuz TM-7 (Mir EO-4); Soyuz TM-12/TM-13 (Mir EO-9/EO-10); STS-60; STS-88; Soyuz TM-31/STS-102 (Expedition 1); Soyuz TMA-6 (Expedition 11)
- Retired: March 27, 2009

Sergei Konstantinovich Krikalev (Russian: Сергей Константинович Крикалёв; born 27 August 1958) is a Russian mechanical engineer and former cosmonaut. He is a veteran of six spaceflights, including two long-duration missions to Mir, two short-duration missions aboard NASA's Space Shuttle, and two long-duration missions to the International Space Station (ISS).

On STS-60, he became the first Russian cosmonaut to fly on the Shuttle, and on STS-88, he helped connect the first Russian and American ISS segments—becoming, alongside mission commander Robert Cabana, one of the first people to enter the station. He later joined the ISS's first long-duration crew, Expedition 1, and returned as commander of Expedition 11.

Krikalev is sometimes referred to as the "last Soviet citizen," having been aboard Mir during the dissolution of the Soviet Union. With the country that launched him no longer existing, his return was delayed, and he remained in space for 311 days—twice as long as planned. He ultimately accumulated 803 days, 9 hours, and 39 minutes in space, placing him fourth on the list of those with the most time spent in space.

He retired as a cosmonaut in 2007 and then served as deputy chief designer at Energia, where he contributed to the development of Russian spacecraft. From 2009 to 2014, he headed the Yuri Gagarin Cosmonaut Training Center. Since 2014, he has worked for Roscosmos, Russia's space agency, where he is a Deputy Director General leading human spaceflight efforts.

== Biography ==
Krikalev was born in Leningrad in the Soviet Union (now Saint Petersburg, Russia). He enjoys swimming, skiing, cycling, aerobatic flying, and amateur radio operations, particularly from space (callsign U5MIR). He graduated from high school in 1975. In 1981, he received a mechanical engineering degree from the Leningrad Mechanical Institute, now called Baltic State Technical University.

After graduation in 1981, he joined NPO Energia, the Russian industrial organization responsible for crewed space flight activities. He tested space flight equipment, developed space operations methods, and participated in ground control operations. When the Salyut 7 space station failed in 1985, he worked on the rescue mission team, developing procedures for docking with the uncontrolled station and repairing the station's on-board system.

=== Mir ===
Krikalev was selected as a cosmonaut in 1985, completed his basic training in 1986, and, for a time, was assigned to the Buran Shuttle program. In early 1988, he began training for his first long-duration flight aboard the Mir space station.

This training included preparations for at least six EVAs (space walks), installation of a new module, the first test of the new Manned Maneuvering Unit (MMU), and the second joint Soviet-French science mission. Soyuz TM-7 was launched on 26 November 1988, with Krikalev as flight engineer, Commander Aleksandr Volkov, and French astronaut Jean-Loup Chrétien. The previous crew (Vladimir Titov, Musa Manarov, and Valeri Polyakov) remained on Mir for another 25 days, marking the longest period a six-person crew had been in orbit. After the previous crew returned to Earth, Krikalev, Polyakov, and Volkov continued to conduct experiments aboard the Mir station. Because the arrival of the next crew had been delayed, they prepared the Mir for a period of uncrewed operations before returning to Earth on 27 April 1989.

In April 1990, Krikalev began preparing for his second flight as a member of the backup crew for the eighth long-duration Mir mission, which also included five EVAs and a week of Soviet-Japanese operations. In December 1990, Krikalev began training for the ninth Mir mission which included training for ten EVAs. Soyuz TM-12 launched on 19 May 1991, with Krikalev as flight engineer, Commander Anatoly Artsebarsky, and British astronaut Helen Sharman. Sharman returned to Earth with the previous crew after one week, while Krikalev and Artsebarsky remained on Mir. During the summer, they conducted six EVAs to perform a variety of experiments and some station maintenance tasks.

In July 1991, Krikalev agreed to stay on Mir as flight engineer for the next crew, scheduled to arrive in October because the next two planned flights had been reduced to one. The engineer slot on the Soyuz TM-13 flight on 2 October 1991, was filled by Toktar Aubakirov, an astronaut from the Kazakh Soviet Socialist Republic, who had not been trained for a long-duration mission. Both Aubakirov and Franz Viehböck, the first Austrian astronaut, returned with Artsebarsky on 10 October 1991. Commander Alexander Volkov remained on board with Krikalev. After the crew replacement in October, Volkov and Krikalev continued Mir experiment operations and conducted another EVA before returning to Earth on 25 March 1992.

Throughout his various missions aboard Mir, Krikalev regularly communicated with various amateur radio operators (hams) across the globe. A particularly lengthy relationship was formed between Krikalev and Australian amateur radio operator Margaret Iaquinto. At one point during one of his stays in space, he contacted her once a day for an entire year. Krikalev and Iaquinto successfully communicated via packet radio for the first time in history between an orbiting space station and an amateur radio operator. They communicated about personal matters, as well as political ones. Iaquinto set up a makeshift digital bulletin board that the Mir cosmonauts would often use to obtain western news and information regarding the state of the collapsing Soviet Union.

Krikalev was in space when the Soviet Union was dissolved on 26 December 1991. With the Baikonur Cosmodrome and the landing area both being located in the newly independent Kazakhstan, there was a great deal of uncertainty about the fate of his mission. He remained in space twice as long as originally planned, spending a total of 311 days in space. Because Krikalev spent so much time in space traveling at high velocities, time dilation (or the slowing down of clocks) caused him to be 0.02 seconds younger than other people born at the same time as him. He returned to Earth on 25 March and is sometimes referred to as the "last Soviet citizen". These events are documented and contextualized in Romanian filmmaker Andrei Ujică's 1995 documentary Out of the Present. Krikalev's story inspired the 2017 film Sergio and Sergei, directed by Ernesto Daranas.

=== Space Shuttle ===
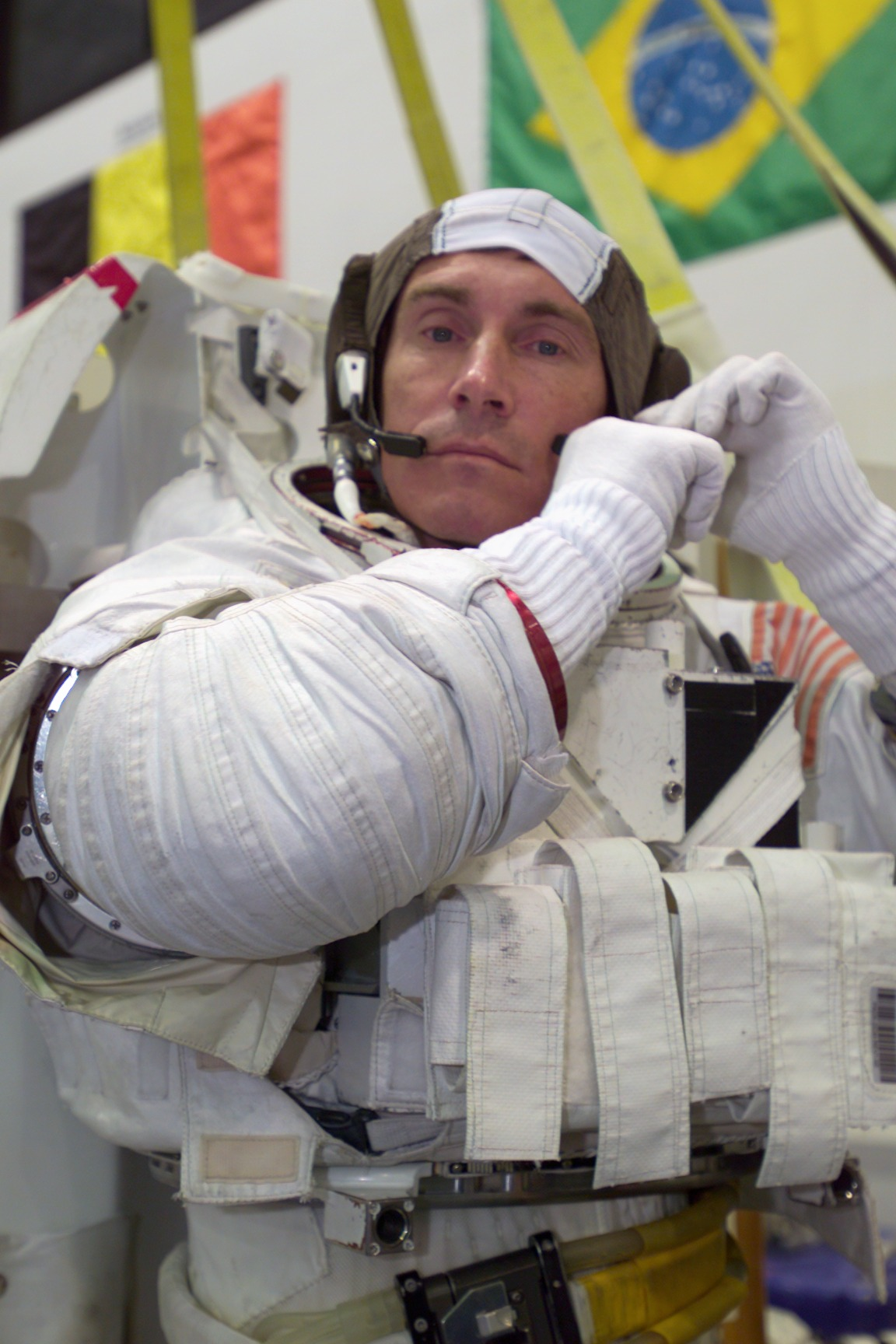
Expedition 11 commander Sergei Krikalev dons a training space suit.

In October 1992, NASA announced that an experienced cosmonaut would fly aboard a future Space Shuttle mission. Krikalev was one of two candidates named by the Russian Space Agency for mission specialist training with the crew of STS-60. In April 1993, he was assigned as prime mission specialist. In September 1993, Vladimir Titov was selected to fly on STS-63 with Krikalev training as his backup.

Krikalev flew on STS-60, the first joint U.S./Russian Space Shuttle Mission. Launched on 3 February 1994, STS-60 was the second flight of the Space Habitation Module-2 (Spacehab-2), and the first flight of the Wake Shield Facility (WSF-1). During the eight-day flight, the crew of Discovery conducted a wide variety of materials science experiments, both on the Wake Shield Facility and in the Spacehab, Earth observation, and life science experiments. Krikalev conducted significant portions of the Remote Manipulator System (RMS) operations during the flight. Following 130 orbits of the Earth in 3,439,705 nautical miles (6,370,334 km), STS-60 landed at Kennedy Space Center, Florida, on 11 February 1994. With the completion of this flight, Krikalev logged an additional eight days, seven hours, nine minutes in space.

Krikalev returned to duty in Russia following his American experience on STS-60. Periodically he returned to the Johnson Space Center in Houston to work with CAPCOM in Mission Control and ground controllers in Russia supporting joint U.S./Russian Missions STS-63, STS-71, STS-74 and STS-76.

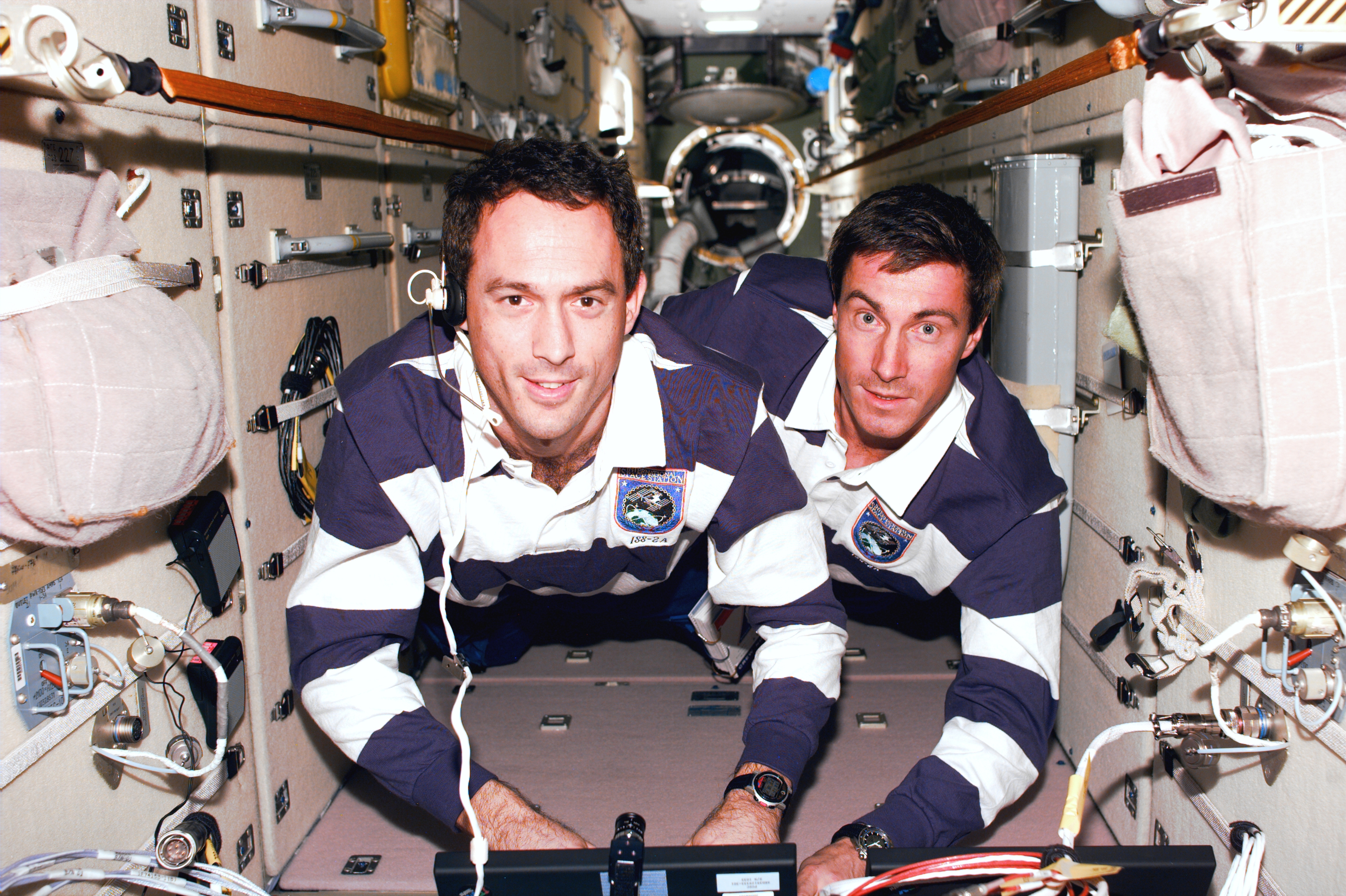
Krikalev with James H. Newman (left) during STS-88

Krikalev flew on STS-88 Endeavour (4–15 December 1998), the first International Space Station (ISS) assembly mission. During the 12-day mission the Unity module was mated with Zarya module. To reflect the international cooperation required to build the station Krikalev and the mission commander Robert Cabana became the first to enter the new station together on 10 December 1998. The crew also performed IMAX Cargo Bay Camera (ICBC) operations, and deployed two satellites, Mighty Sat 1 and SAC-A. The mission was accomplished in 185 orbits of the Earth in 283 hours and 18 minutes.

=== International Space Station ===
Krikalev was a member of the Expedition 1 crew. They launched 31 October 2000, on a Soyuz rocket from Baikonur Cosmodrome in Kazakhstan, successfully docking with the station on 2 November 2000. During their stay on the station, they prepared the inside of the orbital outpost for future crews. They also saw the station grow in size with the installation of the U.S. solar array structure and the U.S. Destiny Laboratory Module. They left the station with the STS-102 crew, undocking from the station on 18 March with landing at the Kennedy Space Center, Florida, on 21 March 2001.

Krikalev was also the commander of Expedition 11. He lived and worked aboard the International Space Station on a six-month tour of duty. This was the third time he had flown to the International Space Station. Expedition 11 launched from Baikonur Cosmodrome in Kazakhstan on 14 April 2005 aboard a Soyuz spacecraft and docked with the ISS on 16 April 2005. Following eight days of joint operations and handover briefings, they replaced the Expedition 10 crew who returned to earth aboard Soyuz. Expedition 11 plans called for two spacewalks, the first in August from the US Quest airlock in US spacesuits, and the second, in September, in Russian spacesuits from the Pirs airlock. On 16 August 2005 at 1:44 a.m. EDT he passed the record of 748 days in space held by Sergei Avdeyev.

Expedition 11 undocked from the ISS on 10 October 2005 at 5:49 p.m. EDT and landed in Kazakhstan on 10 October 2005 at 9:09 p.m. EDT. They were replaced by William S. McArthur and Valeri Tokarev, the crew of Expedition 12.

In completing his sixth space flight, Krikalev logged 803 days and 9 hours and 39 minutes in space, including eight EVAs. He is currently fourth to Gennady Padalka, Oleg Kononenko and Yuri Malenchenko in the record for the most time spent in space.

Krikalev's contributions to the ISS were not limited to his on-orbit time. On 15 June 2007, Krikalev was brought to the Russian Mission Control center to instruct Expedition 15 Flight Engineer Oleg Kotov on how he and ISS Commander Fyodor Yurchikhin could jump-start the Russian segment's crippled computer systems.

=== Later career ===
On 15 February 2007, Krikalev was appointed Vice President of the S.P. Korolev Rocket and Space Corporation Energia (Russian: Ракетно-космическая корпорация "Энергия" им. С.П.Королева) in charge of crewed space flights. In that office, he was the administrator of the Yuri Gagarin Cosmonaut Training Center from 2009 to 2014.

=== In popular culture ===
A character based on Krikalev features in the 2017 Cuban film drama Sergio and Sergei, in which a professor and amateur radio enthusiast in Havana contacts a cosmonaut named Sergei aboard the Mir space station. The film draws parallels between economic hardships in Cuba at the time and the fall of the Soviet Union, which occurred as the real-life Krikalev was aboard Mir.

== Public activities ==
From 1999 to 2007, Krikalev was President of the Russian Gliding Federation.

On 14 February 2012, Krikalev was approved as a member of the Public Chamber of the Central Federal District and a confidant of the Prime Minister and presidential candidate Vladimir Putin, and at the first plenary meeting on 14 September of the same year, he was elected Secretary of the Chamber.

On 12 April 2014, Krikalev was appointed Plenipotentiary Representative of the Governor of Sevastopol in Moscow and St. Petersburg.

In September 2016, Krikalev became a confidant of the United Russia party in the elections to the State Duma of the 7th Convocation.

Since 2017, Krikalev has been the President of the Aircraft Sports Federation of Russia. On 16 December 2017, at the Baikonur Cosmodrome, he became the Ambassador of the WorldSkills Kazan 2019 Championship.

In January 2018, Krikalev became a confidant of Vladimir Putin in the 2018 Russian presidential election.

Krikalev is a member of the Expert Council of the National Prize "Crystal Compass" and President of the International Environmental Foundation "Clean Seas" (since 2009).

== Missions ==
- Soyuz TM-7: Launched 26 November 1988/Landed 27 April 1989
  - 151 days, 11 hours, 8 minutes, 24 seconds
- Soyuz TM-12/Soyuz TM-13: Launched 19 May 1991/Landed 25 March 1992
  - 311 days, 20 hours, 0 minutes, 54 seconds
- STS-60 Space Shuttle Discovery: Launched 3 February 1994
  - 8 days, 7 hours, 9 minutes, 22 seconds
- STS-88 Space Shuttle Endeavour: Launched 4 December 1998
  - 11 days, 19 hours, 18 minutes, 47 seconds
- ISS Expedition 1 Soyuz TM-31/STS-102: Launched 31 October 2000/Landed 21 March 2001
  - 140 days, 23 hours, 38 minutes, 54 seconds
- ISS Expedition 11 Soyuz TMA-6: Launched 14 April 2005/Landed 11 October 2005
  - 179 days, 0 hours, 22 minutes, 35 seconds

== Awards ==
He was a member of the Russian and Soviet national aerobatic flying teams, and was Champion of Moscow in 1983, and Champion of the Soviet Union in 1986.

For his contributions to the Russian space program, he was the first person awarded with the title of Hero of the Russian Federation.

For his space flight experience, he was awarded:

- the title of Hero of the Russian Federation;
- the title of Hero of the Soviet Union (USSR);
- the title of Pilot-Cosmonaut of the USSR (USSR);
- the Order of Lenin (USSR);
- Order For Merit to the Fatherland 4th class;
- Order of Honour;
- Order of Friendship of Peoples (USSR);
- Medal "For Merit in Space Exploration";
- Medal "In Commemoration of the 300th Anniversary of Saint Petersburg".

Foreign awards:

- Officer of the Legion of Honour (France);
- NASA Distinguished Public Service Medal (USA);
- three NASA Space Flight Medals (USA).

He overtook Sergei Avdeyev's previous record for the career total time spent in space (747.59 days) during Expedition 11 to the International Space Station. Krikalev has logged a total of 803 days and 9 hours and 39 minutes in space.

On 23 May 2007 Sergei Krikalev was selected as an honorary citizen of Saint Petersburg together with conductor Valery Gergiev.

Krikalev was one of five cosmonauts selected to raise the Russian flag at the Sochi 2014 Winter Olympics opening ceremony.

== See also ==
- List of human spaceflights chronologically
- List of ISS spacewalks
- List of Space Shuttle missions
- List of spacewalks and moonwalks

Preceded by Leroy Chiao	ISS Expedition Commander; 17 April 2005 to 10 October 2006	Succeeded by William McArthur
