= Klaus-Dietrich Flade =

German test pilot and cosmonaut (born 1952)

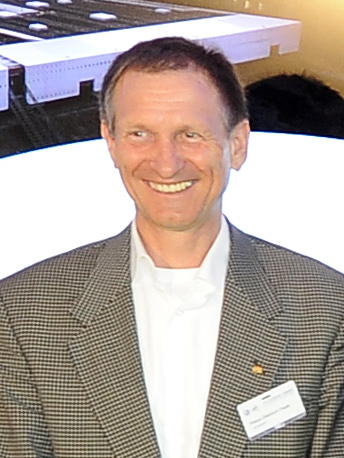
- Born: 23 August 1952 (age 74); Büdesheim, West Germany
- Citizenship: Germany
- Occupation: Test Pilot
- Space career

DFVLR astronaut
- Rank: Lieutenant colonel, German Air Force
- Time in space: 7d 21h 57m
- Selection: 1990 German Group
- Mission: Soyuz TM-14, Soyuz TM-13

Klaus-Dietrich Flade (born 23 August 1952) is a German pilot and former German Aerospace Center astronaut who visited the Mir space station in 1992 aboard the Soyuz TM-14 mission, returning to Earth a week later aboard Soyuz TM-13.

== Biography ==
Born in Büdesheim, West Germany, he joined the German Air Force after school. Educated initially as an airplane engineer, he studied aerospace engineering at the University of the Bundeswehr Munich from 1976 to 1980. Afterwards he became a pilot. He trained as a test pilot from 1988 to 1989. In October 1990, he was selected as part of the German astronaut team for the Euromir '92 flight.

After two years of training, he flew as a research cosmonaut on Soyuz TM-14 in March 1992. After his spaceflight, he returned to the German Air Force. He is now test pilot at Airbus Industrie.
