= Soyuz TMA-6 =

2005 Russian crewed spaceflight to the ISS

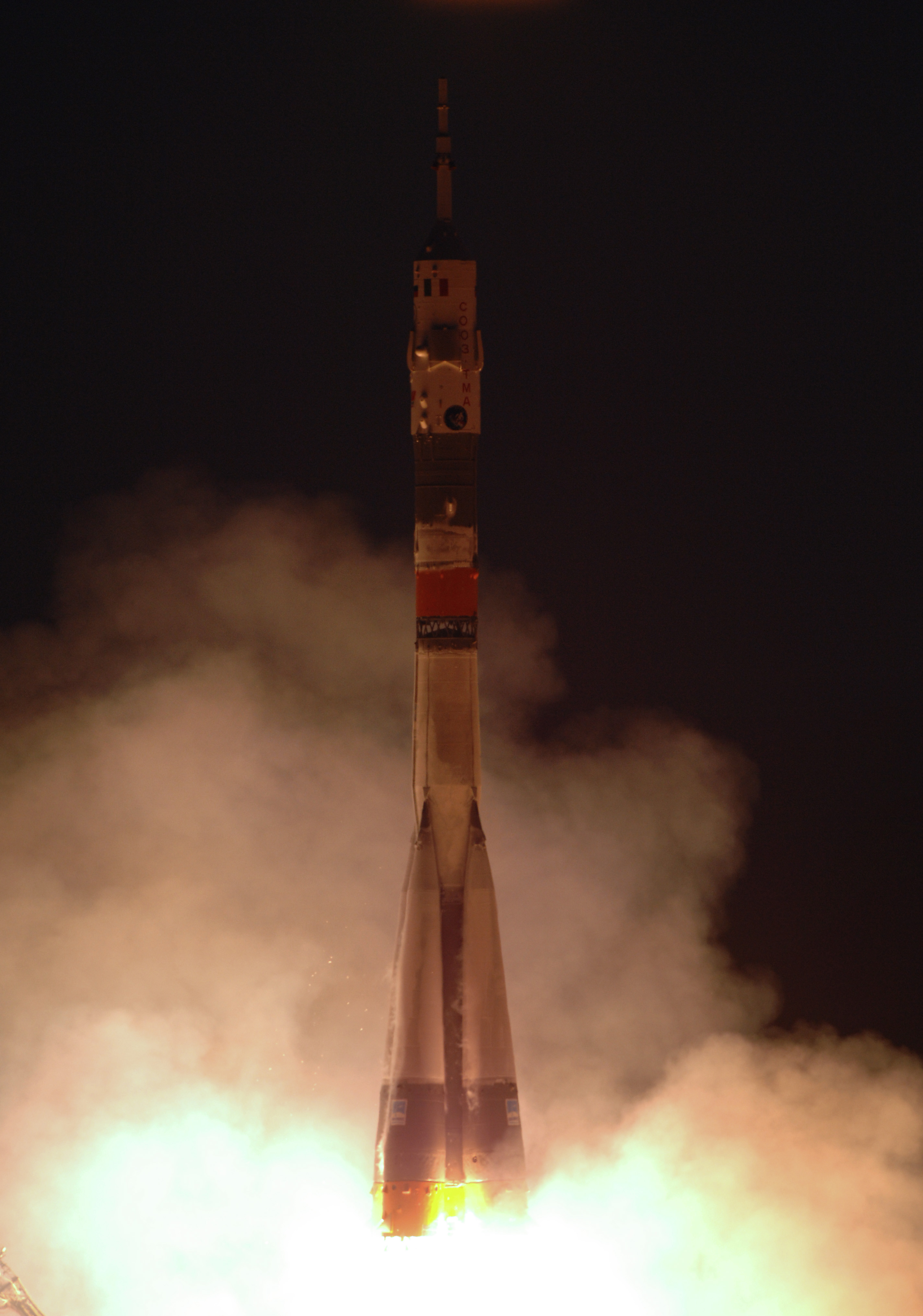
- Soyuz TMA-6 launches to the International Space Station
- Operator: Roscosmos
- COSPAR ID: 2005-013A
- SATCAT no.: 28640
- Mission duration: 179 days, 23 hours, 36 minutes, 57 seconds
- Orbits completed: 2,817

Spacecraft properties
- Spacecraft type: Soyuz-TMA 11F732
- Manufacturer: Energia
- Launch mass: 7,200 kilograms (15,900 lb)

Crew
- Crew size: 3
- Members: Sergei Krikalev; John Phillips
- Launching: Roberto Vittori
- Landing: Gregory Olsen

Start of mission
- Launch date: April 15, 2005, 00:46:25 UTC
- Rocket: Soyuz-FG
- Launch site: Baikonur 1/5

End of mission
- Landing date: October 11, 2005, 01:09:00 UTC

Orbital parameters
- Reference system: Geocentric
- Regime: Low Earth
- Perigee altitude: 349 kilometres (217 mi)
- Apogee altitude: 360 kilometres (220 mi)
- Inclination: 51.64 degrees
- Period: 92.6 minutes

Docking with ISS
- Docking port: Pirs nadir
- Docking date: 17 April 2005; 02:20 UTC
- Undocking date: 19 July 2005; 10:38 UTC
- Time docked: 93d 8h 18m

Docking with ISS (Relocation)
- Docking port: Zarya nadir
- Docking date: 19 July 2005; 11:08 UTC
- Undocking date: 10 October 2005; 21:49 UTC
- Time docked: 83d 10h 41m
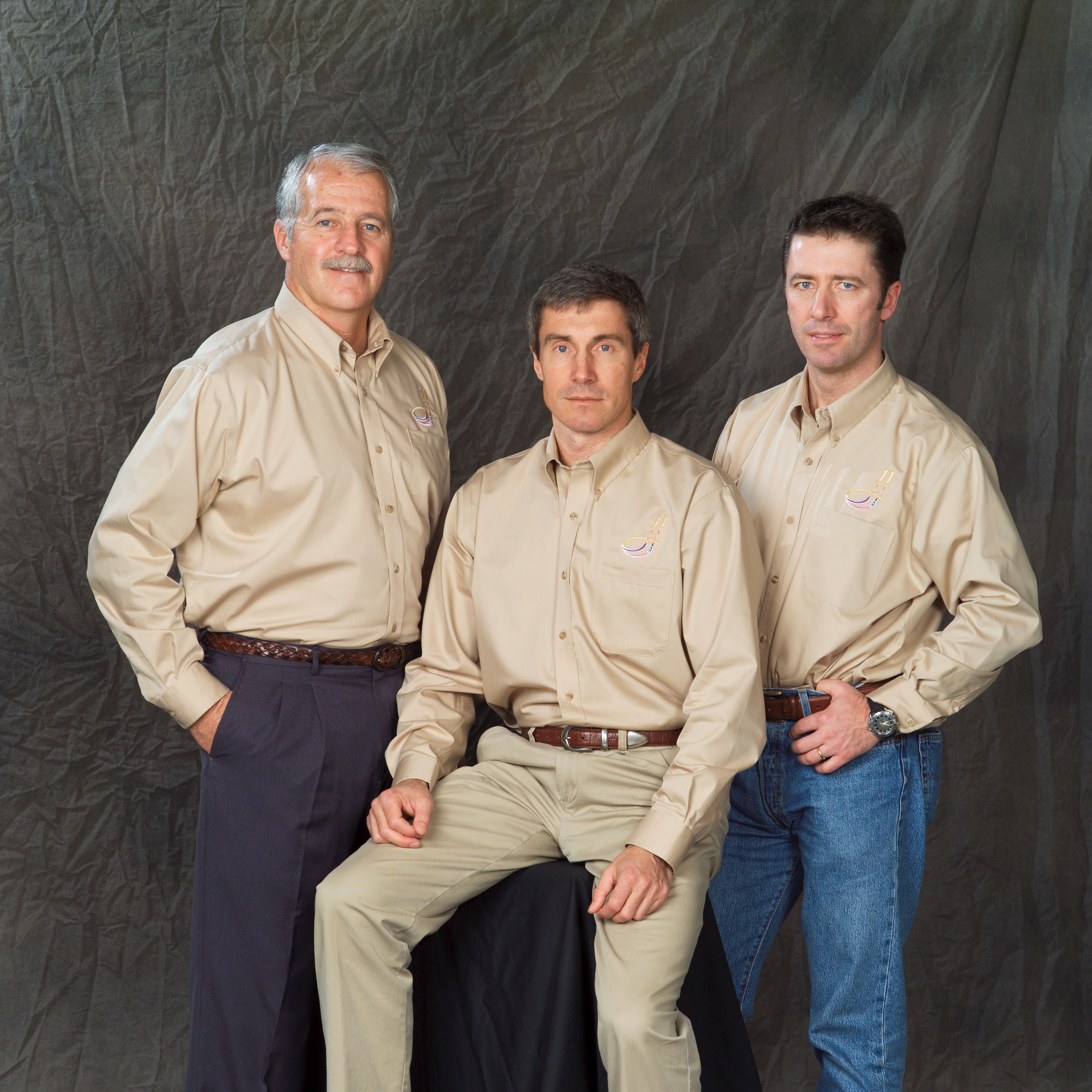
- (l to r) Vittori, Krikalev, Phillips Soyuz programme (Crewed missions)

Soyuz TMA-6 was a human spaceflight to the International Space Station (ISS). It carried three crew members of Expedition 11 to the International Space Station. It was the 26th crewed flight to the ISS. It was launched by a Soyuz FG and returned to Earth after performing operations at the ISS.

== Crew ==
| Position | Launching crew | Landing crew |
|---|---|---|
| Commander | (Russia) Sergei Krikalev, Roscosmos; Expedition 11; Sixth and last spaceflight | |
| Flight Engineer | (United States) John Phillips, NASA; Expedition 11; Second spaceflight | |
| Flight Engineer/Spaceflight Participant | (Italy) Roberto Vittori, ESA; Second spaceflight | (United States) Gregory Olsen, SA; Only spaceflight Third Tourist |

== Docking with ISS ==
- Docked to ISS: April 17, 2005, 02:20 UTC (to Pirs module)
- Undocked from ISS: July 19, 2005, 10:38 UTC (from Pirs module)
- Docked to ISS: July 19, 2005, 11:08 UTC (to nadir port of Zarya)
- Undocked from ISS: October 10, 2005, 21:49 UTC (from nadir port of Zarya)

== Mission highlights ==
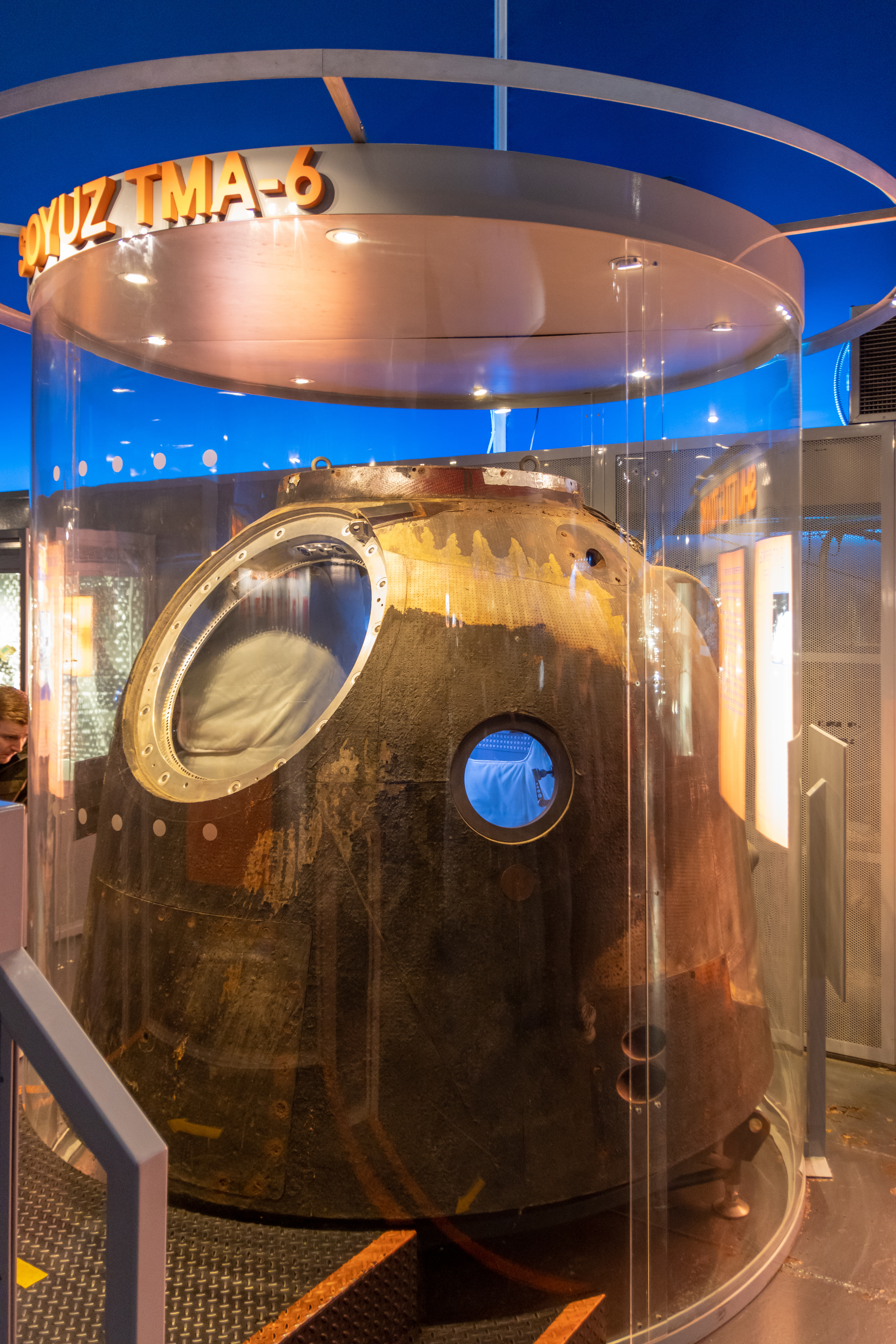
TMA-6 capsule on display at the Intrepid Sea, Air & Space Museum

Soyuz TMA-6 is a Soyuz TMA spacecraft which was launched on April 15, 2005 by a Soyuz-FG rocket from Baikonur Cosmodrome. During the return flight from the ISS, instruments in the descent module of the Soyuz spacecraft indicated a cabin-pressure-leak that is still under investigation. The Expedition 11 crew, Sergei Krikalev-Cdr Russia, John Phillips-U.S.A. replaced the Expedition 10 crew, Leroy Chiao-Cdr U.S.A. and Salizhan Sharipov-Russia.

The astronaut Roberto Vittori brought a painting by the German-Russian artist George Pusenkoff titled Single Mona Lisa (1:1) to the space station, which shows a modified image of Leonardo da Vinci's Mona Lisa, and took video and photo shots of the work in the International Space Station. This art action, initiated by Pusenkoff, was mainly made possible by the efforts of the then Italian ambassador to Russia, Gianfranco Facco Bonetti. The combination of science and art, as da Vinci himself lived it, was used here to let his spirit work not only on earth, but also in space. The photos are documented in the book Mona Lisa Travels. The European segment of the mission was called "Eneide".
