= Soyuz TM-14 =

1992 Russian crewed spaceflight to Mir

- Operator: Rosaviakosmos
- COSPAR ID: 1992-014A
- SATCAT no.: 21908
- Mission duration: 145 days, 14 hours, 10 minutes, 32 seconds
- Orbits completed: ~2,280

Spacecraft properties
- Spacecraft: Soyuz 7K-STM No. 64
- Spacecraft type: Soyuz-TM
- Manufacturer: NPO Energia
- Launch mass: 7,150 kilograms (15,760 lb)

Crew
- Crew size: 3
- Members: Aleksandr Viktorenko; Aleksandr Kaleri
- Launching: Klaus-Dietrich Flade
- Landing: Michel Tognini
- Callsign: Ви́тязь (Vityaz' – Knight)

Start of mission
- Launch date: 17 March 1992, 10:54:30 UTC
- Rocket: Soyuz-U2

End of mission
- Landing date: 10 August 1992, 01:05:02 UTC
- Landing site: 136 kilometres (85 mi) SE of Dzhezkazgan

Orbital parameters
- Reference system: Geocentric
- Regime: Low Earth
- Perigee altitude: 373 kilometres (232 mi)
- Apogee altitude: 394 kilometres (245 mi)
- Inclination: 51.6 degrees
- Period: 92.2 minutes

Docking with Mir
- Docking date: 19 March 1992, 12:32:50 UTC
- Undocking date: 9 August 1992, 21:46:47 UTC
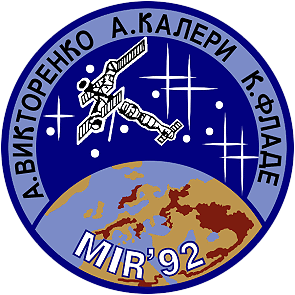
- Soyuz programme (Crewed missions)

Soyuz TM-14 was the 14th expedition to the Mir space station. It included an astronaut from Germany, and was the first Russian Soyuz mission after the collapse of the Soviet Union.

== Crew ==
Position	Launching crew	Landing crew
Commander	Aleksandr Viktorenko; Third spaceflight	
Flight engineer	Aleksandr Kaleri; First spaceflight	
Research cosmonaut	Klaus-Dietrich Flade, DLR; Only spaceflight	Michel Tognini, CNES; First spaceflight

== Mission highlights ==
Klaus Dietrich Flade became the second German to visit a space station when he reached Mir with the Vityaz crew. The first was Sigmund Jähn of East Germany, who visited Salyut 6 in 1978. Flade conducted 14 German experiments as part of Germany's preparation for participation in the Freedom and Columbus space station projects.

Suffered a landing system malfunction, causing its descent module to turn over. It came to rest upside down, trapping its occupants inside until it could be righted.
