= Toktar Aubakirov =

Soviet cosmonaut (born 1946)

- Тоқтар Әубәкіров
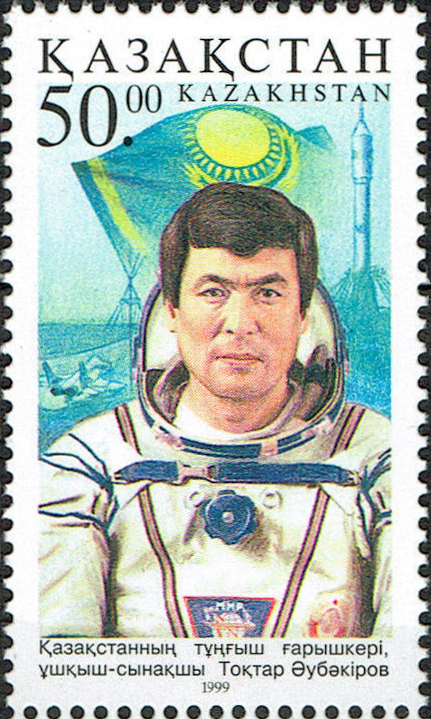
- Toktar Aubakirov on a 1999 stamp of Kazakhstan
- Born: 27 July 1946 (age 80); Karaganda, Kazakh SSR, Soviet Union
- Occupation: Test pilot
- Awards: Hero of Kazakhstan; Hero of the Soviet Union
- Space career

Cosmonaut
- Status: Retired
- Rank: Major General
- Time in space: 7d 22h 12m
- Selection: 1991 Cosmonaut Group
- Missions: Soyuz TM-13, Soyuz TM-12

Toktar Ongarbayuly Aubakirov (Kazakh: Тоқтар Оңғарбайұлы Әубәкіров (Toqtar Oñğarbaiūly Äubäkırov), Russian: Токтар Онгарбаевич Аубакиров, born on 27 July 1946) is a retired Kazakh Air Force officer and a former cosmonaut. He is the first person from Kazakhstan to go to space.

== Early life ==
Toktar Aubakirov was born in Karkaraly District, Karaganda Region, Kazakh SSR, which is now Kazakhstan. After graduating from the 8th grade of a secondary school he started working as a metal turner at the Temirtau foundry, whilst attending an evening school. In 1965 he joined the Armavir Military Aviation Institute of the Anti-Air Defence Pilots. He served as a fighter pilot in the Soviet Air Force on the Far East borders of the USSR until his acceptance into the Fedotov Test Pilot School in 1975.

== Test pilot career ==
Between 1976 and 1991 Aubakirov served as a test pilot at the Mikoyan Experimental Design Bureau (MiG aircraft). During this time he tested over 50 types of aircraft. He was the first in the Soviet Union to make a nonstop flight crossing the North Pole, with two in-flight refuelings, and the first in the Soviet Union to take off from the aircraft-carrier Tbilisi (later named Kuznetsov) on a MiG 29K.

== Spaceflight experience ==
In 1991, in accordance with an agreement between the governments of the USSR and the Kazakh SSR, Aubakirov started training at the Gagarin Cosmonaut Training Center. On 2 October 1991 he launched with Russian cosmonaut Alexander Volkov as flight commander, and the Austrian research cosmonaut Franz Viehböck in Soyuz TM-13 from the Baikonur Cosmodrome spaceport, and spent over eight days in space. Their mission was the last launched by the Soviet Union, which dissolved shortly thereafter, with Aubakirov becoming a citizen of the independent Republic of Kazakhstan.

== Career ==
Since 1993, he has been the general director of the National Aerospace Agency of the Republic of Kazakhstan. He was a member of the Kazakhstan parliament. Now he is a pensioner and consultant.

=== Family ===
Toktar Aubakirov is married to Tatyana Aubakirova. They have two children: Timur (born in 1977) and Mikhail (born in 1982).

== Awards and honors ==
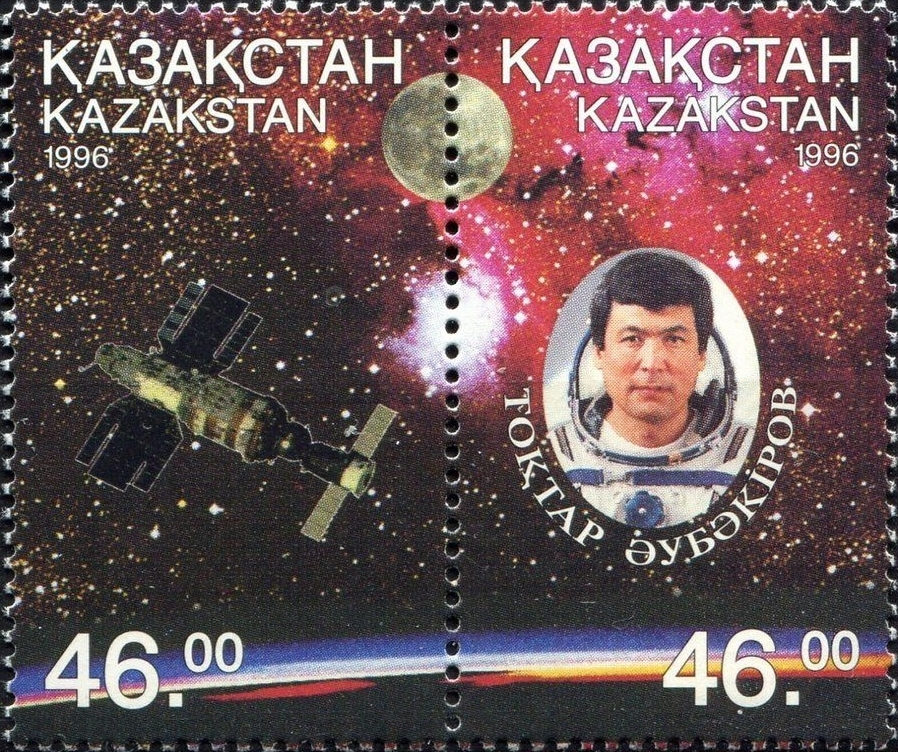
Featured on a stamp

- Hero of Soviet Union (October 31, 1988) – Test flights of MiG aircraft
- People's Hero of Kazakhstan (Halyk Kaharmany) (1995)
- Order of Otan (Kazakhstan) (1995)
- Order of Lenin (1988)
- Honoured Test Pilot of the USSR (November 6, 1990)
- Pilot-Cosmonaut of the USSR (1991, last recipient)
- Pilot-Cosmonaut of Kazakhstan (1994, first recipient)
- Order of the Badge of Honour (1987)
- Decoration of Honour in Gold for Services to the Republic of Austria (Goldenes Ehrenzeichen), twice (1988 and 1993)
- Order of the October Revolution (1991)
- Medal "For Merit in Space Exploration" (12 April 2011) – for outstanding contribution to the development of international cooperation in crewed space flight

== See also ==
- List of astronauts by name
