= Soyuz TM-12 =

1991 Soviet crewed spaceflight to Mir

- COSPAR ID: 1991-034A
- SATCAT no.: 21311
- Mission duration: 144 days, 15 hours, 21 minutes, 50 seconds
- Orbits completed: ~2,260

Spacecraft properties
- Spacecraft: Soyuz 7K-STM No. 62
- Spacecraft type: Soyuz-TM
- Manufacturer: NPO Energia
- Launch mass: 7,160 kilograms (15,790 lb)

Crew
- Crew size: 3
- Members: Anatoly Artsebarsky
- Launching: Sergei Krikalev; Helen Sharman
- Landing: Toktar Aubakirov; Franz Viehböck
- Callsign: Озо́н (Ozone)

Start of mission
- Launch date: 18 May 1991, 12:50:28 UTC
- Rocket: Soyuz-U2

End of mission
- Landing date: 10 October 1991, 04:12:18 UTC
- Landing site: 61 kilometres (38 mi) SW of Arkalyk

Orbital parameters
- Reference system: Geocentric
- Regime: Low Earth
- Perigee altitude: 389 kilometres (242 mi)
- Apogee altitude: 397 kilometres (247 mi)
- Inclination: 51.6 degrees
- Period: 92.4 minutes

Docking with Mir
- Docking date: 20 May 1991, 14:30:43 UTC
- Undocking date: 9 October 1991, 20:55:08 UTC
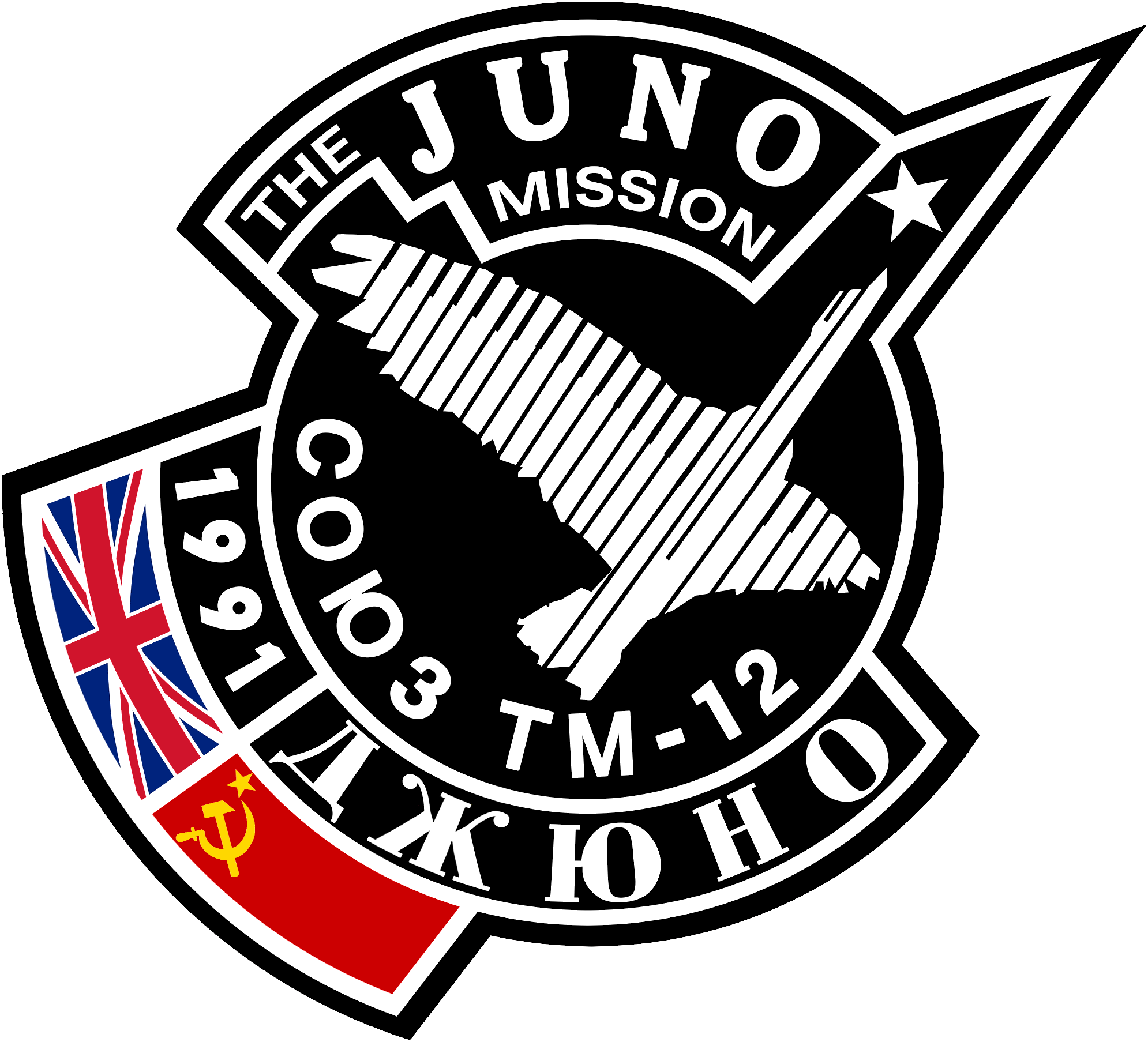
- Soyuz programme (Crewed missions)

Soyuz TM-12 was the 12th expedition to Mir, and included the first Briton in space, Helen Sharman.

== Crew ==
Position	Launching crew	Landing crew
Commander	Anatoly Artsebarsky; Only spaceflight	
Flight engineer	Sergei Krikalev; Second spaceflight	Toktar Aubakirov; Only spaceflight
Research cosmonaut	Helen Sharman, Project Juno; Only spaceflight	Franz Viehböck, Austria; Only spaceflight

== Mission highlights ==
The Mir crew welcomed aboard Anatoli Artsebarski, Sergei Krikalev (on his second visit to the station), and British cosmonaut-researcher Helen Sharman, who was aboard as part of Project Juno, a cooperative venture partly sponsored by British private enterprise. Sharman's experimental program, which was designed by the Soviets, leaned heavily toward life sciences, her speciality being chemistry. A bag of 250,000 pansy seeds was placed in the Kvant-2 EVA airlock, a compartment not as protected from cosmic radiation as other Mir compartments. Sharman also contacted nine British schools by radio and conducted high-temperature superconductor experiments with the Elektropograph-7K device. Sharman commented that she had difficulty finding equipment on Mir as there was a great deal more equipment than in the trainer in the cosmonaut city of Zvezdny Gorodok. Krikalev commented that, while Mir had more modules than it had the first time he lived on board, it did not seem less crowded, as it contained more equipment. Krikalev also noted that some of the materials making up the station's exterior had faded and lost color, but that this had no impact on the station's operation.

The spacecraft spent 144 days docked to Mir. While it was in orbit, the failed coup d'état against Mikhail Gorbachev in August 1991 rocked the Soviet Union, setting in motion events which led to the end of the Soviet Union on 26 December.

== In popular culture ==
Out of the Present, a 1995 film documentary focused on cosmonaut Sergei Krikalev's stay on Mir, features the arrival of Soyuz TM-12.
