= Aleksandr Aleksandrovich Volkov =

Soviet cosmonaut (born 1948)

Aleksandr Volkov
- Александр Волков
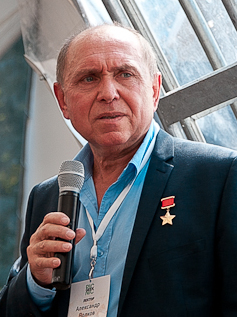
- Born: 27 May 1948 (age 78); Horlivka, Ukrainian SSR, Soviet Union
- Occupation: Test Pilot
- Space career

Roscosmos cosmonaut
- Status: Retired
- Rank: Colonel, Soviet Air Force
- Time in space: 391d 11h 52m
- Selection: 1978 cosmonaut Group
- Total EVAs: 2 (1 during Mir EO-4, 1 during Mir EO-10)
- Total EVA time: 10h, 12m
- Missions: Soyuz T-14 (Salyut 7 EO-4), Soyuz TM-7 (Mir EO-4), Soyuz TM-13 (Mir EO-10)

Aleksandr Aleksandrovich Volkov (Russian: Алекса́ндр Алекса́ндрович Во́лков; born 27 May 1948) is a retired Soviet cosmonaut. He is a veteran of three space flights, including twice to the Mir Soviet space station, and is the father of cosmonaut Sergey Volkov.

== Biography and career ==
Volkov was born in Ukrainian SSR in a family of Russian ethnicity. At the age of 13, Volkov witnessed Yuri Gagarin become the first man in space and this inspired him to become a cosmonaut. He joined the Soviet space programme and became a test pilot before realising his dream.

He flew into space three times. His first spaceflight was a trip to Salyut 7 in 1985 (64 days in space), followed by two flights to the Mir space station, in 1988–1989 (151 days) and again in 1991–1992 (175 days) as commander of flight Soyuz TM-13. On board the Mir space station, he controlled the docking procedures among other things.

The Soviet Union broke up in 1991 during his second stay on board Mir. At the time Volkov was orbiting Earth on Mir with Sergei K. Krikalev, "the last citizens of the USSR". Having gone into orbit as Soviet citizens, they returned to Earth as Russian citizens.

He worked as Commander of the Cosmonaut Team at the Cosmonauts Training Centre from January 1991 until August 1998. His work was to prepare Russian and foreign cosmonauts for future flights to space stations to Mir and the International Space Station.

He is the father of Sergey Volkov. The younger Volkov became the first second-generation cosmonaut when he was launched aboard Soyuz TMA-12 on 8 April 2008, his first of three flights; in total he spent over a year aboard the International Space Station.

Volkov is an active amateur radio operator, and operates using the callsign U4MIR.

== Awards ==
Aleksandr Volkov was awarded:

- Hero of the Soviet Union (1985)
- Order of Lenin (1985)
- Order of the October Revolution (1989)
- Order of Friendship of Peoples (1992)
- Medal 2nd class of the Order of Merit for the Fatherland (1996)
- Medal "For Merit in Space Exploration" (2011)
- Officer of the Legion of Honour (France)
- Order of Merit 3rd class (Ukraine, 2011)
