= Anatoly Artsebarsky =

Soviet cosmonaut (born 1956)

- Анатолий Арцебарский; Анатолій Арцебарський
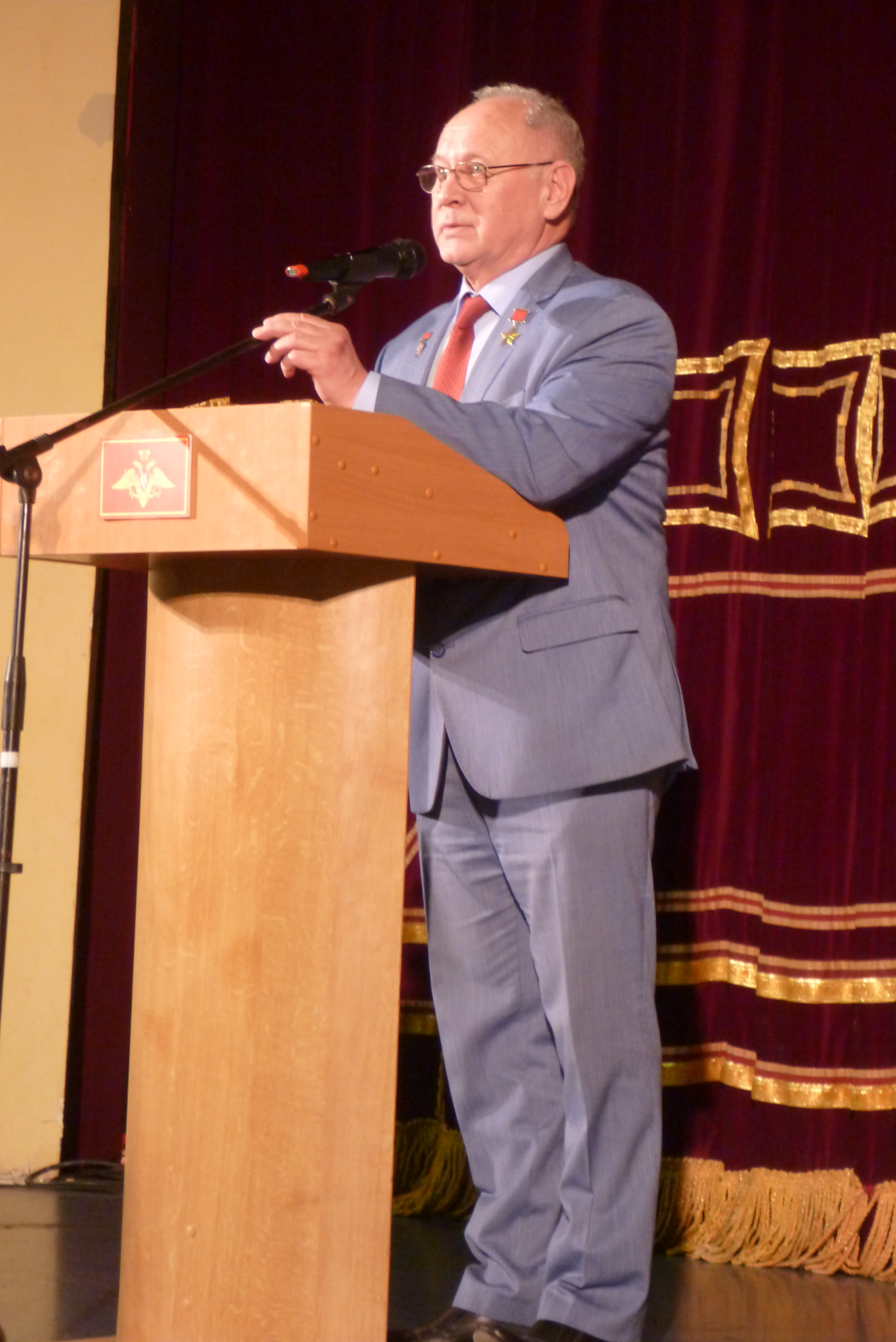
- Artsebarsky in 2019
- Born: 9 September 1956 (age 70); Prosyana, Ukrainian SSR, Soviet Union
- Occupation: Test Pilot
- Awards: Hero of the Soviet Union
- Space career

Cosmonaut
- Status: Retired
- Rank: Colonel, Russian Air Force
- Time in space: 144d 15h 21m
- Selection: 1985
- Total EVAs: 6
- Total EVA time: 32h, 17m
- Missions: Soyuz TM-12 (Mir EO-9)

Anatoly Pavlovich Artsebarsky (Ukrainian: Анатолій Павлович Арцебарський, Russian: Анатолий Павлович Арцебарский; born 9 September 1956) is a former Soviet cosmonaut.

He became a cosmonaut in 1985. Artsebarsky spent almost five months in space on a single spaceflight. In 1991, he flew aboard Soyuz TM-12 and docked with the Mir Space Station. Artsebarsky and Sergei Krikalev stayed aboard Mir while the rest of the crew flew back to Earth after eight days. Artsebarsky took six spacewalks during the Mir EO-9 mission. He spent over 33 hours walking in space.

== Awards ==
- Hero of the Soviet Union
- Pilot-Cosmonaut of the USSR
- Order of Lenin
- Medal "For Merit in Space Exploration"

== In media ==
- Artsebarsky is mentioned in the 2013 movie Gravity, because fictional astronaut Matt Kowalski hopes to break Artsebarsky's spacewalking record.
- He visited Tehran's Sharif University together with cosmonaut Talgat Musabayev on October 7, 2019.
