= List of astronauts educated at the University of California =

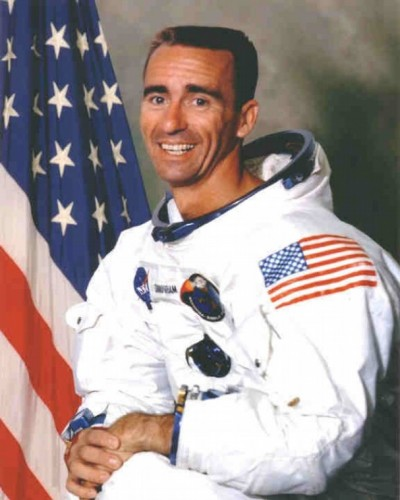
Apollo 7 astronaut Walt Cunningham in 1968

As of 2026, thirty United States astronauts have graduated from the University of California (UC) system, including 10 from UC Berkeley, 10 from UCLA, 4 from UC San Diego, 3 from UC Santa Barbara, 2 from UC Davis, 1 from UC Irvine, and 1 from UC Santa Cruz.

The first alumnus to fly as an astronaut was Walt Cunningham (UCLA), selected in 1963 in NASA Astronaut Group 3 to fly as the Lunar Module Pilot on Apollo 7, the first Apollo Program mission. As of 2026, the most recent alumna to be selected as an astronaut was Deniz Burnham (UC San Diego), of the class of 2021. One alumnus was part of the Apollo program, three were part of Soyuz, and twenty were part of the Space Shuttle program. In total, 31 people educated at the University of California campuses have flown to space, either for NASA or through private space companies.

The UC system is the flagship land-grant public university system in the U.S. state of California. The first campus was established at Berkeley in 1868, followed by Los Angeles in 1919 and major expansion in the 1960s to San Diego, Irvine, and Santa Cruz. The system includes 9 undergraduate campuses in total, including at Berkeley, Davis, Irvine, Los Angeles, Merced, Riverside, San Diego, Santa Barbara, and Santa Cruz.

In addition to the 30 astronauts who are alumni of the University of California, the university system has produced 670 Olympic medalists, 254 members of the National Academy of Sciences, and 75 Nobel Prize laureates.

== University of California, Berkeley ==
Alumni of the University of California, Berkeley include 10 NASA astronauts and 1 private astronaut.

No.	Photograph	Name	Class Year	Degree	Notability	References
1		Don L. Lind	1965	M.S. and Ph.D. in high-energy nuclear physics	Capsule Communicator (CAPCOM) on Apollo 11 and Apollo 12; Payload Specialist on STS-51-B (1985); backup pilot for Skylab 3 and Skylab 4	
2		James van Hoften	1966	B.S. in civil engineering	Mission Specialist on STS-41-C (1984), STS-51-J (1985), and STS-61-G (not flown); former senior VP at Bechtel Corporation	
3		Brian O'Leary	1967	Ph.D. in astronomy	NASA scientist-astronaut; trained for Apollo Applications Program (never flew); scientist on Mariner 10; professor at Cornell University, Princeton University, and UC Berkeley	
4		F. Drew Gaffney	1968	B.A. in psychology	Payload Specialist on STS-40 Spacelab Life Sciences-1 (1991); professor at Vanderbilt University	
5		Margaret Rhea Seddon	1970	B.A. in physiology	Mission Specialist on STS-51-D (1985), STS-40 (1991), and STS-58 (1993); scientist on STS-90; Chief Medical Officer at Vanderbilt University Medical School	
6		Charles Simonyi	2007	B.S. in Engineering Mathematics and Statistics	Commercial astronaut at Space Adventures; Soyuz TMA-10 (2007) and Soyuz TMA-14 (2009)	
7		Leroy Chiao	1983	B.S. in chemical engineering	Mission Specialist on STS-65 (1994), STS-72 (1996), STS-92 (2000); Commander of Expedition 10; first Asian-American to perform a spacewalk	
8		Rex Walheim	1984	B.S. in mechanical engineering	Mission Specialist on STS-110 (2002), STS-122 (2008), and STS-135 (2011); member of "Final Four" Space Shuttle astronauts; retired Air Force Colonel	
9		Tamara E. Jernigan	1985	M.S. in astronomy	Mission Specialist on STS-40 (1991), STS-52 (1992), STS-67 (1995), STS-80 (1996), and STS-96 (1999); associate director at Lawrence Livermore National Laboratory	
10		Mary Weber	1988	M.S. and Ph.D. in Physical Chemistry	Mission Specialist on STS-70 and STS-101; former VP at University of Texas Southwestern Medical Center	
11		Woody Hoburg	2013	M.S. and Ph.D. in electrical engineering and computer science	Pilot of SpaceX Crew-6 (Expedition 69/Expedition 70) (2023); selected for Artemis Program	

== University of California, Davis ==
Two NASA astronauts are alumni of the University of California, Davis.

No.	Photograph	Name	Class Year	Degree	Notability	References
1		Stephen Robinson	1994	B.S. in mechanical engineering and aerospace engineering	Mission Specialist on STS-85 (1997), STS-95 (1998), STS-114 (2005), and STS-130 (2010); professor at UC Davis	
2		Tracy Caldwell Dyson	1998	M.S. and Ph.D. in chemistry	Mission Specialist on STS-118 (2007); Flight Engineer for Soyuz TMA-18 (Expedition 23/Expedition 24) (2010) and Soyuz MS-25 (Expedition 70/Expedition 71) (2024)	

== University of California, Irvine ==
One astronaut is affiliated with the University of California, Irvine.

No.	Photograph	Name	Class Year	Degree	Notability	References
1		Tracy Caldwell Dyson	1997	Postdoctoral fellow in Chemistry	Mission Specialist on STS-118 (2007); Flight Engineer for Soyuz TMA-18 (Expedition 23/Expedition 24) (2010) and Soyuz MS-25 (Expedition 70/Expedition 71) (2024)	

== University of California, Los Angeles ==
Alumni of UCLA include 10 astronauts.

No.	Photograph	Name	Class Year	Degree	Notability	References
1		Story Musgrave	1959	M.B.A. in Operations Analysis and Computer Programming	Mission Specialist on STS-6, STS-33, STS-44, STS-61, and STS-80; Payload Specialist on STS-51-F; only astronaut to fly on all five space shuttles	
2		Walter Cunningham	1960	B.A. & M.S. in physics	Lunar Module Pilot on Apollo 7 (1968)	
3		Vance Brand	1964	M.B.A.	Command module pilot for Apollo-Soyuz; commander on STS-5, STS-41-B, and STS-35	
4		Taylor Wang	1967	B.S., M.S., and Ph.D. in physics	Payload Specialist on STS-51-B (1985); first Chinese‑American in space	
5		Anna Lee Fisher	1976	B.S., M.S. in chemistry; M.D.	Mission Specialist on STS-51-A (1984); first mother in space	
6		Sally Ride	1977	Transferred	Mission Specialist on STS-7 (1983) and STS-41-G (1984); first American woman in space; first LGBTQ+ person in space; youngest American astronaut	
7		John L. Phillips	1987	M.S., Ph.D. in Geophysics and Space Physics	Shuttle and Soyuz TMA-6 (Expedition 11) missions	
8		K. Megan McArthur	1993	B.S. in aerospace engineering	Mission Specialist on STS-125 (2009); Pilot on SpaceX Crew-2 (Expedition 65/Expedition 66)	
9		Jessica Watkins	2015	M.S. and Ph.D. in Geology	Mission Specialist on SpaceX Crew-4 (Expedition 67/Expedition 68); part of the Artemis Program	

== University of California, San Diego ==
Four astronauts are alumnae of the University of California, San Diego. It is the only university whose astronauts are all women.

No.	Photograph	Name	Class Year	Degree	Notability	References
1		Kathleen Rubins	1996	B.S. in molecular biology	Mission Specialist on Soyuz MS-01 (Expedition 48/Expedition 49) and Soyuz MS-17 (Expedition 63/Expedition 64); first person to sequence DNA in space	
2		Jessica U. Meir	2001	Ph.D. in Marine Biology	Flight Engineer on Soyuz MS-15 (Expedition 61/Expedition 62); conducted first all‑female spacewalk	
3		K. Megan McArthur	2002	M.S. and Ph.D. in Oceanography	Mission Specialist on STS-125 (2009); Pilot on SpaceX Crew-2 (Expedition 65/Expedition 66); last person to service the Hubble Space Telescope	
4		Deniz Burnham	2007	B.S. in chemical engineering	NASA astronaut (Class of 2021); completed basic training and eligible for missions to ISS/moon/Mars	

== University of California, Santa Barbara ==
Three astronauts are alumni of the University of California, Santa Barbara.

No.	Photograph	Name	Class Year	Degree	Notability	References
1		José M. Hernández	1986	M.S. in Electrical & Computer Engineering	Mission Specialist on STS-128 (2009); Regent of the University of California	
2		Joseph M. Acabá	1990	B.S. in Geology	Mission Specialist on STS-119 (2009), Soyuz TMA-04M (Expedition 31/Expedition 32) (2012), and Soyuz MS-06 (Expedition 53/Expedition 54) (2017); 18th chief of the Astronaut Office; first Caribbean and Puerto Rican in space	
3		Leroy Chiao	1990	M.S. and Ph.D. in chemical engineering	Mission Specialist on STS-65 (1994), STS-72 (1996), STS-92 (2000); Commander of Expedition 10	

== University of California, Santa Cruz ==
One astronaut is an alumna of the University of California, Santa Cruz.

No.	Photograph	Name	Class Year	Degree	Notability	References
1		Kathryn D. Sullivan	1973	B.S. in Earth Sciences	One of the first six women selected to the NASA astronaut corps (1978); Mission Specialist on STS-41-G (1984), STS-31 (1990), and STS-45 (1992); first American woman to walk in space; former NOAA Administrator; first woman to dive into the Challenger Deep in the Mariana Trench; member of President's Council of Advisors on Science and Technology	

== See also ==
- List of University of California, Berkeley alumni in science and technology
- University of California
- NASA Astronaut Corps
