= Expedition 11 =

11th trip to the International Space Station

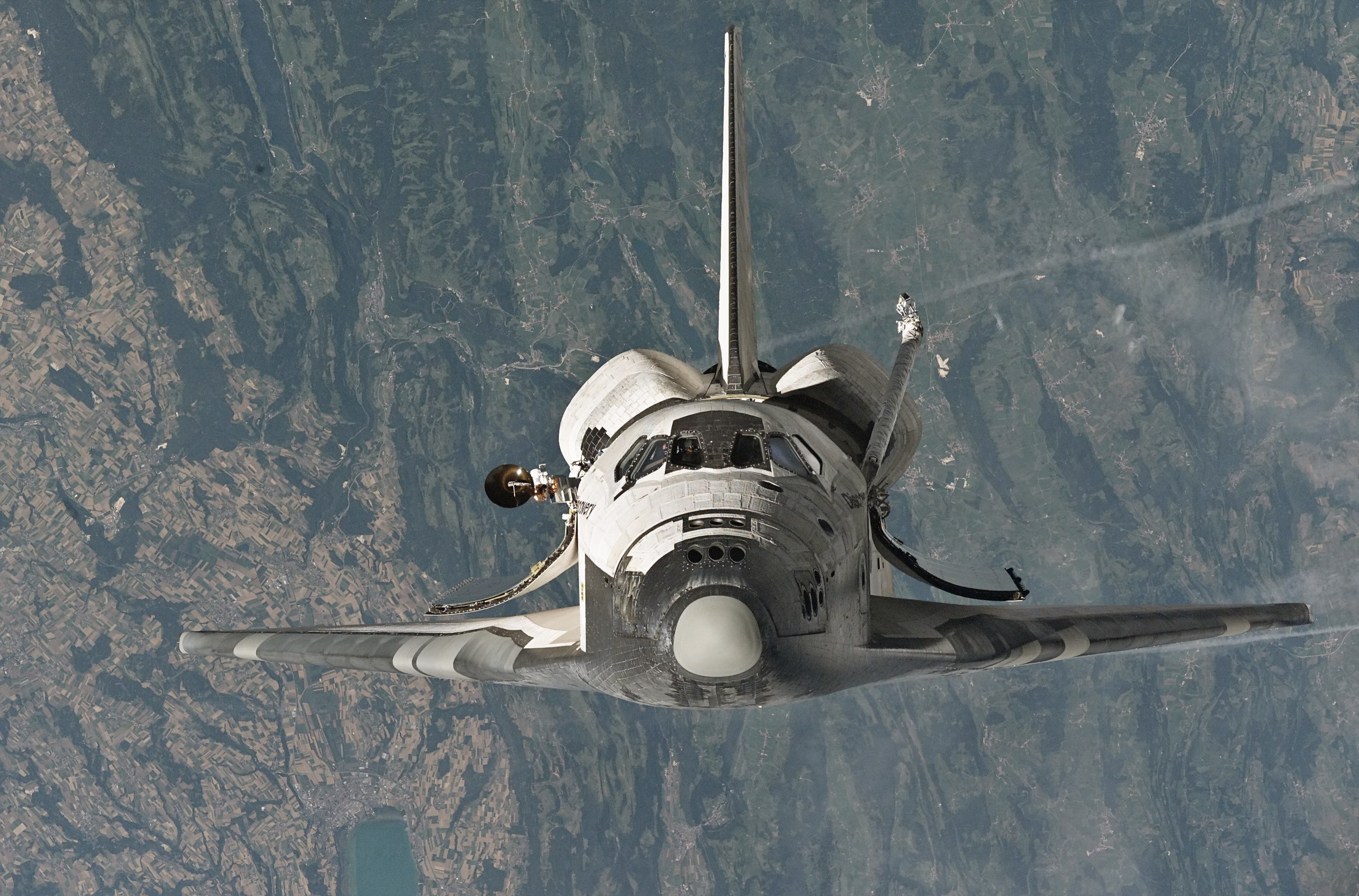
- Space Shuttle Discovery photographed by Expedition 11 as it performed the first-ever rendezvous pitch maneuver.
- Mission type: Long-duration expedition
- Mission duration: 176 days, 19 hours and 30 minutes (at ISS) 179 days and 23 minutes (launch to landing)
- Orbits completed: 2,817

Expedition
- Space station: International Space Station
- Began: 17 April 2005, 02:19 UTC
- Ended: 10 October 2005, 21:49 UTC
- Arrived aboard: Soyuz TMA-6
- Departed aboard: Soyuz TMA-6

Crew
- Crew size: 2
- Members: Sergei Krikalev; John Phillips
- EVAs: 1
- EVA duration: 4 hours and 58 minutes
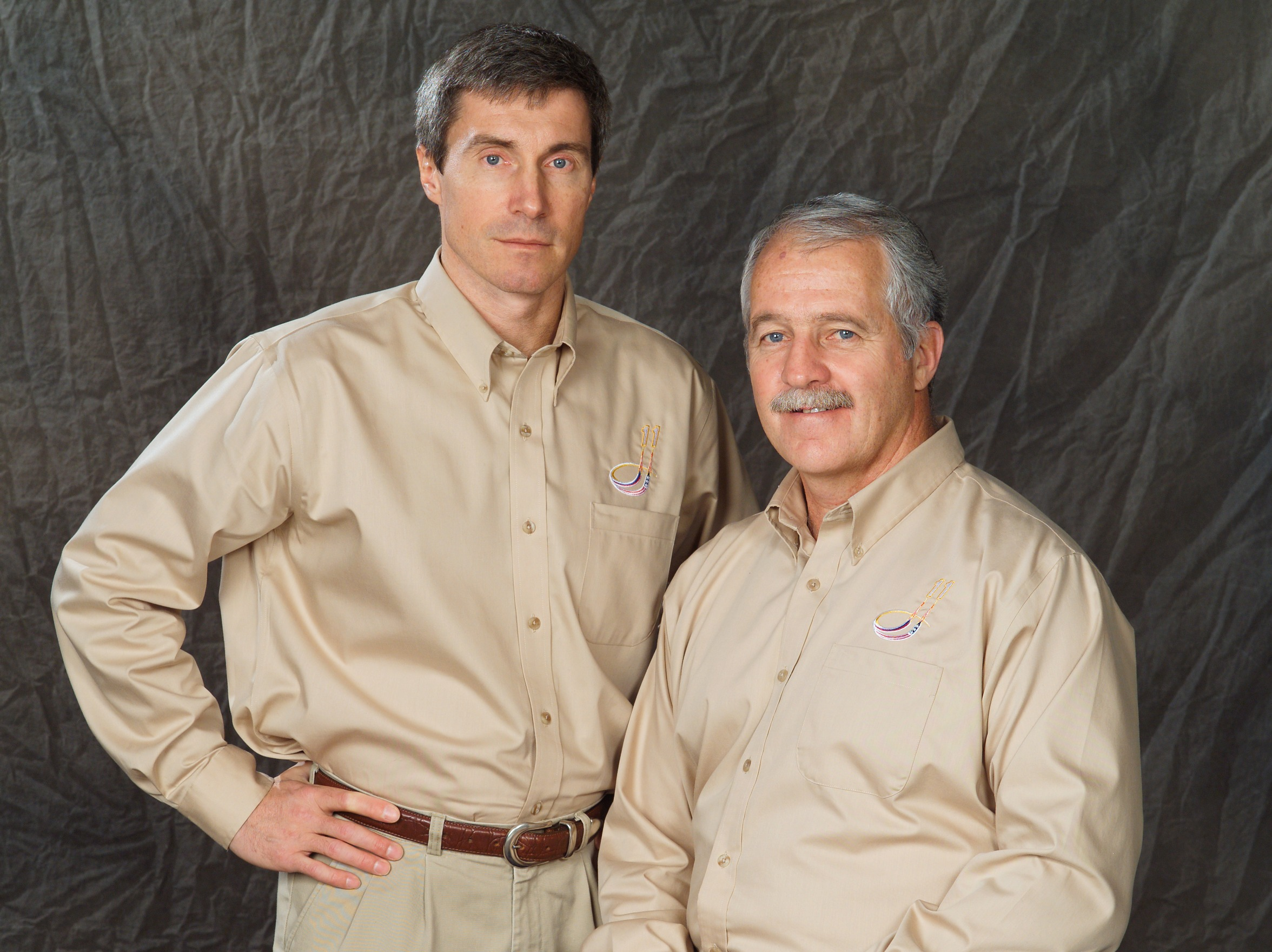
- Expedition 11 mission patch Krikalev and Phillips ISS expeditions

Expedition 11 was the 11th long-duration expedition to the International Space Station. The crew arrived and departed aboard Soyuz TMA-6, which stayed at the station for the duration of the expedition in case it was needed for emergency evacuation.

European Space Agency Italian Astronaut Roberto Vittori launched with Expedition 11 on the Soyuz TMA-6 spacecraft and returned 24 April 2005 with Expedition 10 on Soyuz TMA-5.

Expedition 11 became the first ISS crew since Expedition 6 to be visited by a Space Shuttle, following the Space Shuttle Columbia disaster.

== Crew ==
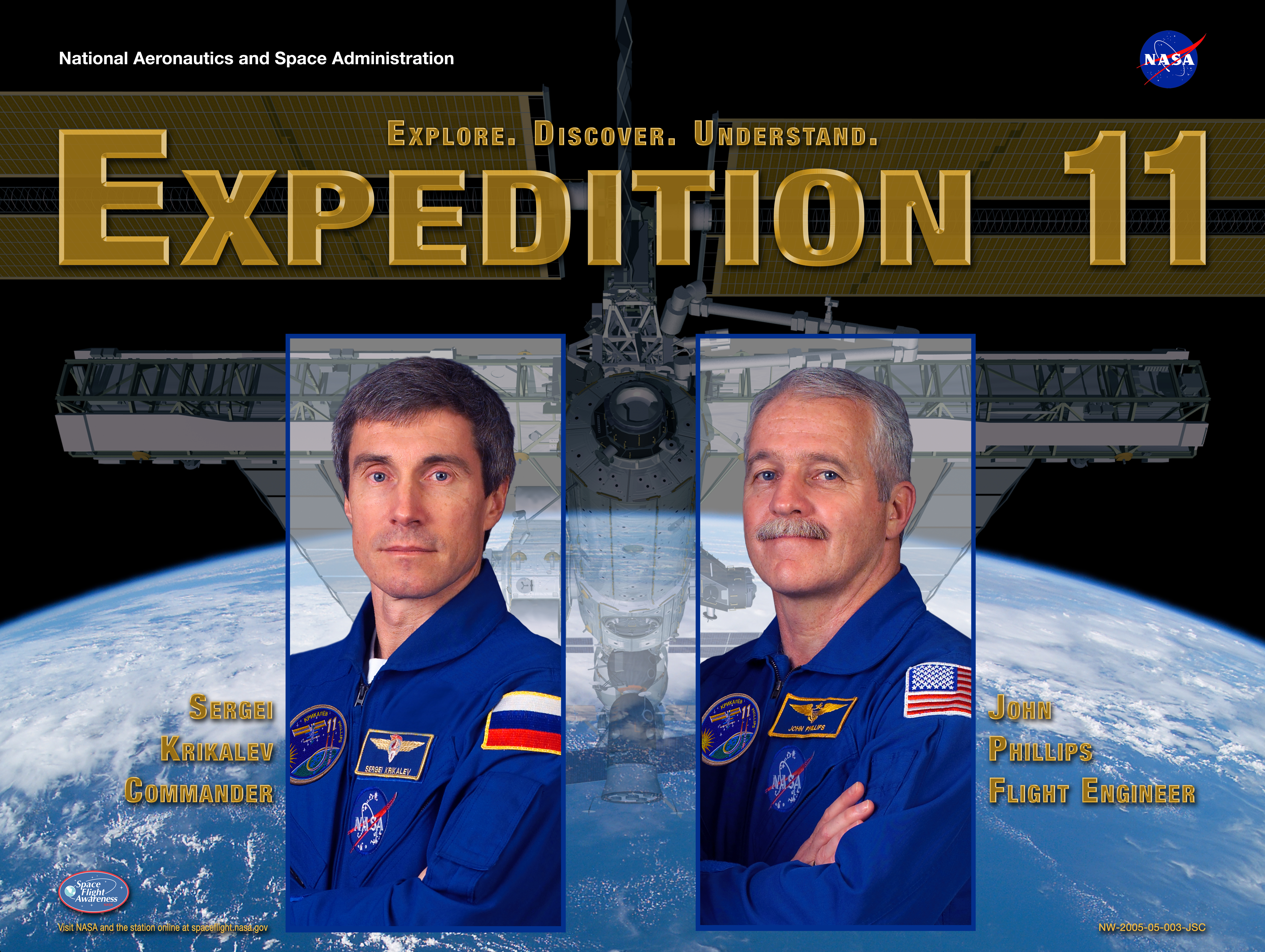
Expedition 11 promotional poster

Position	Crew
Commander	Sergei Krikalev, RSA; Sixth and last spaceflight
Flight Engineer	John Phillips, NASA; Second spaceflight

== Mission parameters ==
- Perigee: ~384 km
- Apogee: ~396 km
- Inclination: ~51.6°
- Orbital period: ~92 min

== Mission objectives ==
Expedition 11 commander Sergey Krikalev and flight engineer John Phillips arrived at the International Space Station aboard Soyuz TMA-6 on 17 April 2005 at 02:19 UTC. They were joined by Roberto Vittori of the European Space Agency, who was making a short-duration stay at the station. After a one-week handover period, Expedition 10 commander Salizhan Sharipov and flight engineer Leroy Chiao departed aboard Soyuz TMA-5, along with Vittori on 24 April 2005 18:44 UTC.

On 28 July 2005 at 11:18 UTC, Expedition 11 became the first ISS crew since Expedition 6 to be visited by a Space Shuttle. STS-114 was the first "Return to Flight" Space Shuttle mission following the Space Shuttle Columbia disaster. The Space Shuttle Discovery, docked to the station, and delivered a Control Moment Gyroscope to replace one failed unit and the External stowage platform 2 as part of the approximately 4.100 kg cargo carried in Discovery's payload bay and inside the Multi-Purpose Logistics Module Raffaello. On 6 August 2005 the Orbiter undocked from the ISS taking the MPLM back.

During the Expedition 11 mission, Krikalev exceeded the record for total time in space (formerly held by Sergei Avdeyev with 747.593 days). Krikalev at launch had spent 624.387 days in space. He passed the record on the 123rd day of the mission, on 16 August 2005. His cumulative time in space was 803 days, 9 hours and 39 minutes upon landing.

On 7 September 2005 the uncrewed Progress M-53 (18P) cargo spacecraft undocked from the station and was destructively deorbited, to make way for the arrival of Progress M-54 (19P) which docked on 10 September 2005 and transferred around 2,400 kilograms (5,300 lb) of cargo, (fuel, water, and dry cargo including oxygen generators) to the station.

On 3 October 2005 Soyuz TMA-7 docked bringing the Expedition 12 crew.

Thomas Reiter (ESA) was scheduled to join the mission in October 2005 on the supply mission STS-121 to the ISS, but due to that mission's delay until 2006, he became a crew member of Expedition 13.

== Spacewalks ==
Two spacewalks were planned for Expedition 11 however only one took place. On 18 August 2005 19:02 UTC (3:02 p.m. EDT) the crew started a 4-hour, 58-minute spacewalk. They removed and brought inside the station a Russian Biorisk experiment container housing bacteria from the outside of Pirs; an MPAC (a micrometeoroid and orbital debris collector) and SEED (a materials exposure array) panel from the Zvezda Service Module; and the Matroska experiment, (radiation dosimeters in human-tissue-equivalent material). They installed a television camera on Zvezda, and checked a Korma contamination-exposure experiment tablet, and removed and replaced a materials exposure experiment container.
