= Expedition 10 =

10th expedition to the International Space Station

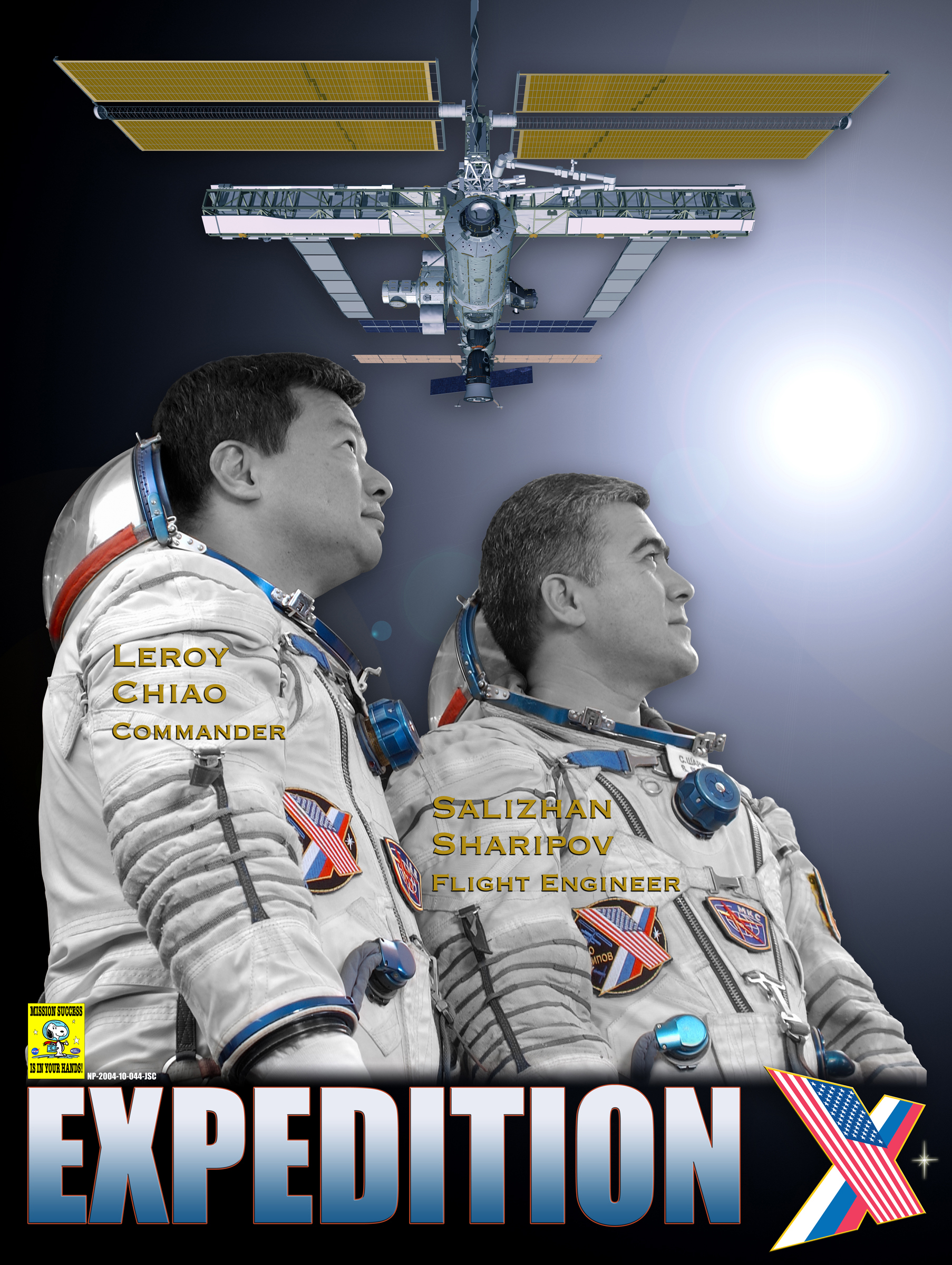
- Promotional poster
- Mission type: Long-duration expedition
- Mission duration: 190 days, 11 hours, 23 minutes (at ISS); 192 days 19 hours, 2 minutes (launch to landing)
- Distance travelled: ~122,000,000 kilometres (76,000,000 mi)
- Orbits completed: ~2,975

Expedition
- Space station: International Space Station
- Began: 16 October 2004, 04:16 UTC
- Ended: 24 April 2005, 18:45 UTC
- Arrived aboard: Soyuz TMA-5
- Departed aboard: Soyuz TMA-5

Crew
- Crew size: 2
- Members: Leroy Chiao; Salizhan Sharipov
- EVAs: 2
- EVA duration: 10 hours, 34 minutes
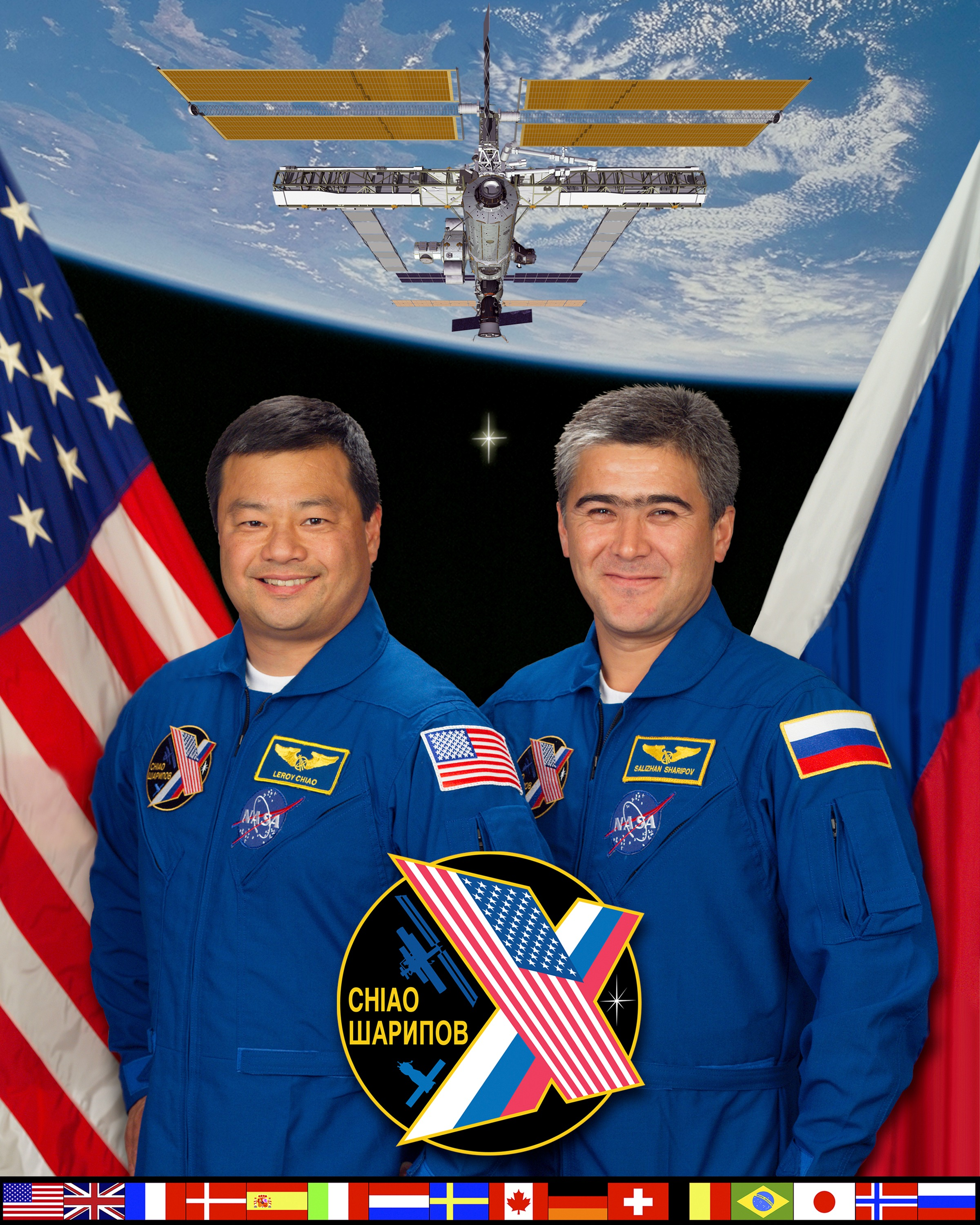
- Expedition 10 mission patch L-R: Leroy Chiao and Salizhan Sharipov ISS expeditions

Expedition 10 (2004–2005) was the tenth expedition to the International Space Station, using the Soyuz TMA-5, which stayed during the expedition for emergency evacuation.

== Crew ==
| Position | Crew |
|---|---|
| Commander | Leroy Chiao, NASA; Fourth and last spaceflight |
| Flight Engineer | Salizhan Sharipov, RSA; Second and last spaceflight |

== Mission parameters ==
- Perigee: 384 km
- Apogee: 396 km
- Inclination: 51.6°
- Orbital period: 92 min

== Mission objectives ==
Chiao and Sharipov docked at the Space Station on 16 October 2004 aboard Soyuz TMA-5, to relieve Expedition 9 crewmates Mike Fincke and Gennady Padalka. Chiao was the expedition commander and NASA science officer, and Sharipov was the Soyuz commander and flight engineer. Both Astronauts were researchers in the Advanced Diagnostic Ultrasound in Microgravity Project.

Notable accomplishments included replacing critical hardware in the Quest Joint Airlock; repairing U.S. spacesuits; and submitting a scientific research paper on ultrasound use in space. Chiao was also the first astronaut to vote in a U.S. Presidential election from space.

== Notable events ==
Partial Sun eclipse from ISS, 8 April 2005

The launch of Expedition 10 was rescheduled. During preflight testing, an explosive bolt was accidentally activated on the Soyuz TMA-5 spacecraft. The resulting damage caused was repaired and the mission launched from Baikonur Cosmodrome in Kazakhstan on 14 October 2004.

During the Expedition 10 mission, two Progress supply spacecraft docked with the International Space Station. The first (Progress 51) docked on 25 December 2004 followed by the second (Progress 52) on 28 February 2005.

European Space Agency Astronaut Roberto Vittori of Italy launched to the Station with the Expedition 11 crew and spent eight days onboard performing scientific experiments. Vittori returned to Earth with the Expedition 10 crew. He was aboard under a contract between ESA and the Russian Federal Space Agency.

The re-entry of the Soyuz TMA-5 spacecraft was perfect, returning the astronauts to Earth 53 miles northeast of the town of Arkalyk after 192 days, 19 hours and 2 minutes in space. The recovery team reached the capsule in minutes.

== Crew ==
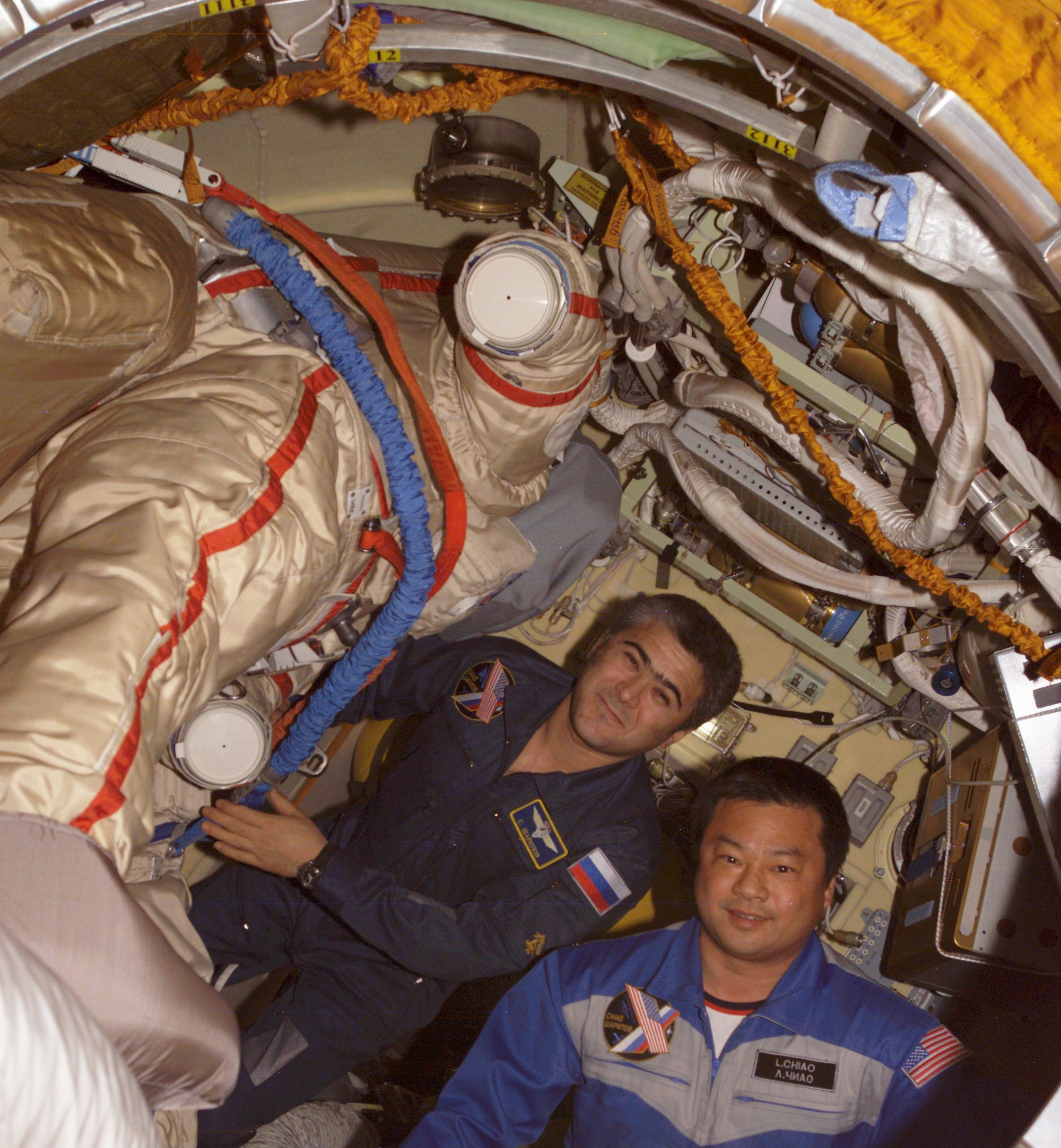
Salizhan Sharipov (left) and Leroy Chiao (right) work with their Russian Orlan spacesuits in the Pirs Docking Compartment of the International Space Station (ISS). (NASA)

Chiao is a veteran of three Space Shuttle flights, and spent 13 hours on two spacewalks in 2000 as part of a construction mission at the Station. Sharipov has logged over 211 hours in space. He served as a mission specialist on the Shuttle during the eighth Shuttle-Mir docking mission in 1998.

== Spacewalks ==
The Expedition 10 crew completed two spacewalks, including experiment installation and tasks to prepare the Station for the arrival of the new European Automated Transfer Vehicle in 2006. Instead, the Automated Transfer Vehicle came in 2008. The first spacewalk took place on 26 January 2005 and the second on 28 March 2005.
