= Salizhan Sharipov =

Kyrgyz cosmonaut (born 1964)

- Салижан Шарипов; Солижон Шарипов; Солиҷон Шарипов
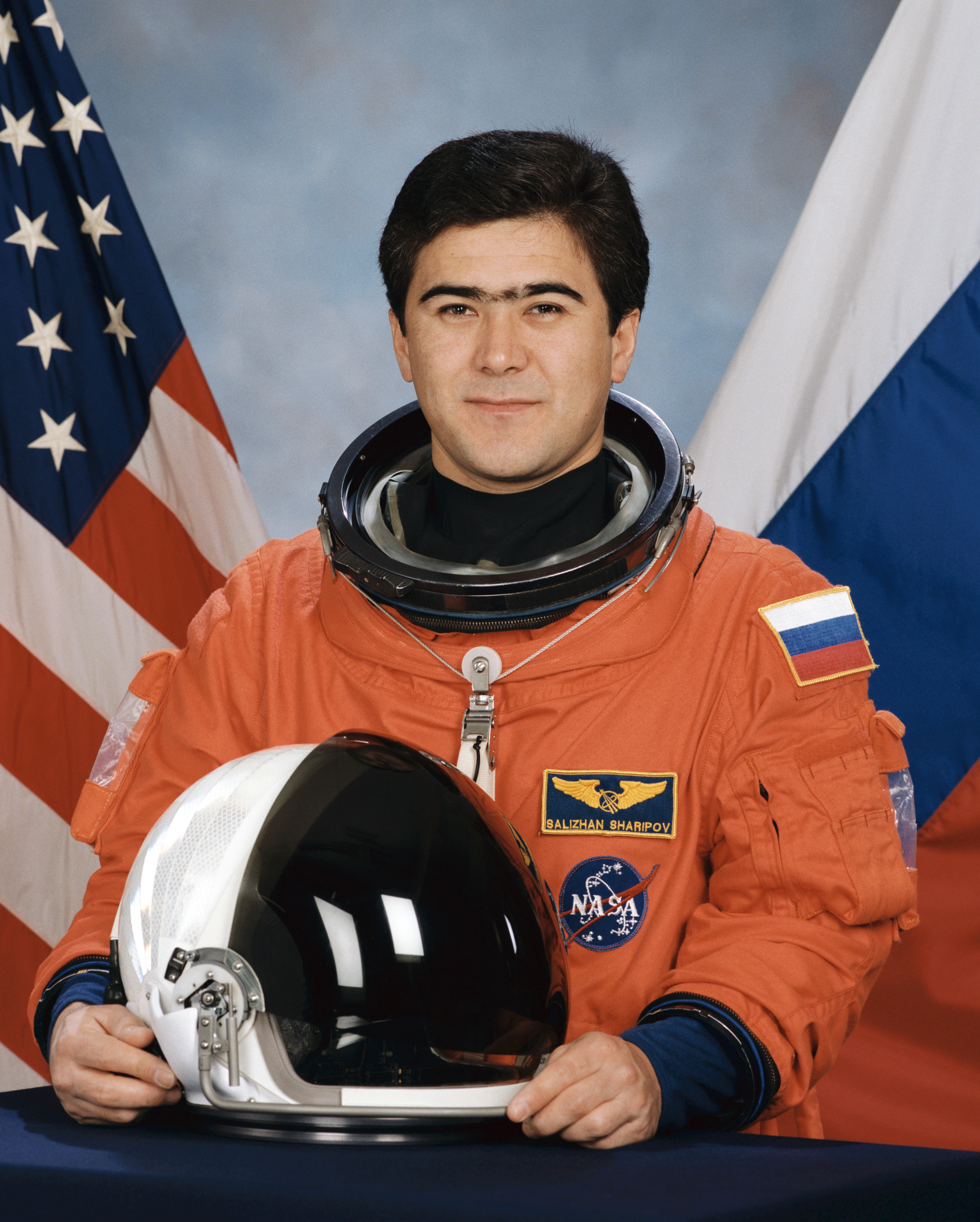
- Born: 24 August 1964 (age 62); Andijan Region, Uzbek SSR, Soviet Union (now Uzbekistan)
- Occupation: Air Force Pilot
- Awards: Hero of the Russian Federation
- Space career

Roscosmos cosmonaut
- Status: Retired
- Rank: Colonel
- Time in space: 201d 14h 50m
- Selection: 1990 Cosmonaut Group
- Total EVAs: 2 (during Expedition 10)
- Total EVA time: 9h, 58m
- Mission: STS-89, Soyuz TMA-5 (Expedition 10)

Salizhan Shakirovich Sharipov (Note: Russian: Салижан Шакирович Шарипов, Uzbek: Солижон Шокирович Шарипов, Kyrgyz: Салижан Шакир уулу Шарипов, Tajik: Солиҷон Шокирович Шарипов) (born 24 August 1964) is a retired Kyrgyz cosmonaut of Uzbek descent. Sharipov is a co-author and investigator for the Advanced Diagnostic Ultrasound in Microgravity project. He has been to space twice (launched from the U.S. as an astronaut in 1998 and from Russia as a cosmonaut in 2004) and has conducted two space walks. Sharipov retired on 18 July 2008.

== Personal life ==
Sharipov was the first cosmonaut of the Uzbekistan Republic. He is of Uzbek descent. He is married to Nadezhda Mavlyanovna Sharipova. They have one daughter, Nigara Salizhanovna Sharipova, born in 1988 and one son, Zhakhongir Salizhanovich Sharipov, born in 1992. He is known to enjoy football and reading. His father, Mr. Shakirzhan Sharipov, resides in Uzgen.

== Education ==
Sharipov graduated from the Soviet Air Force Pilot School in 1987. In 1994, he graduated from Moscow State University with a degree in cartography.

== Awards and honors ==
Pilot-Cosmonaut of the Russian Federation (1988), Hero of the Kyrgyz Republic (Kyrgyz Respublikasynyn Baatyry) (1998). He was decorated with Gold Star Medal of the Hero of the Kyrgyz Republic (Ak Shumkar Medal, 1998), Russian Federation Air Force Medals and NASA Space Flight Medal (1998).

On 20 April 2005, Kyrgyz Republic issued a postal stamp depicting Salizhan Sharipov.

== Experience ==
After graduation from the Air Force Pilot School in 1987, Sharipov worked as a pilot-instructor and taught eight cadets. He has logged over 950 hours flying time. He has experience flying on MiG-21 and L-39 aircraft.

== Cosmonaut career ==
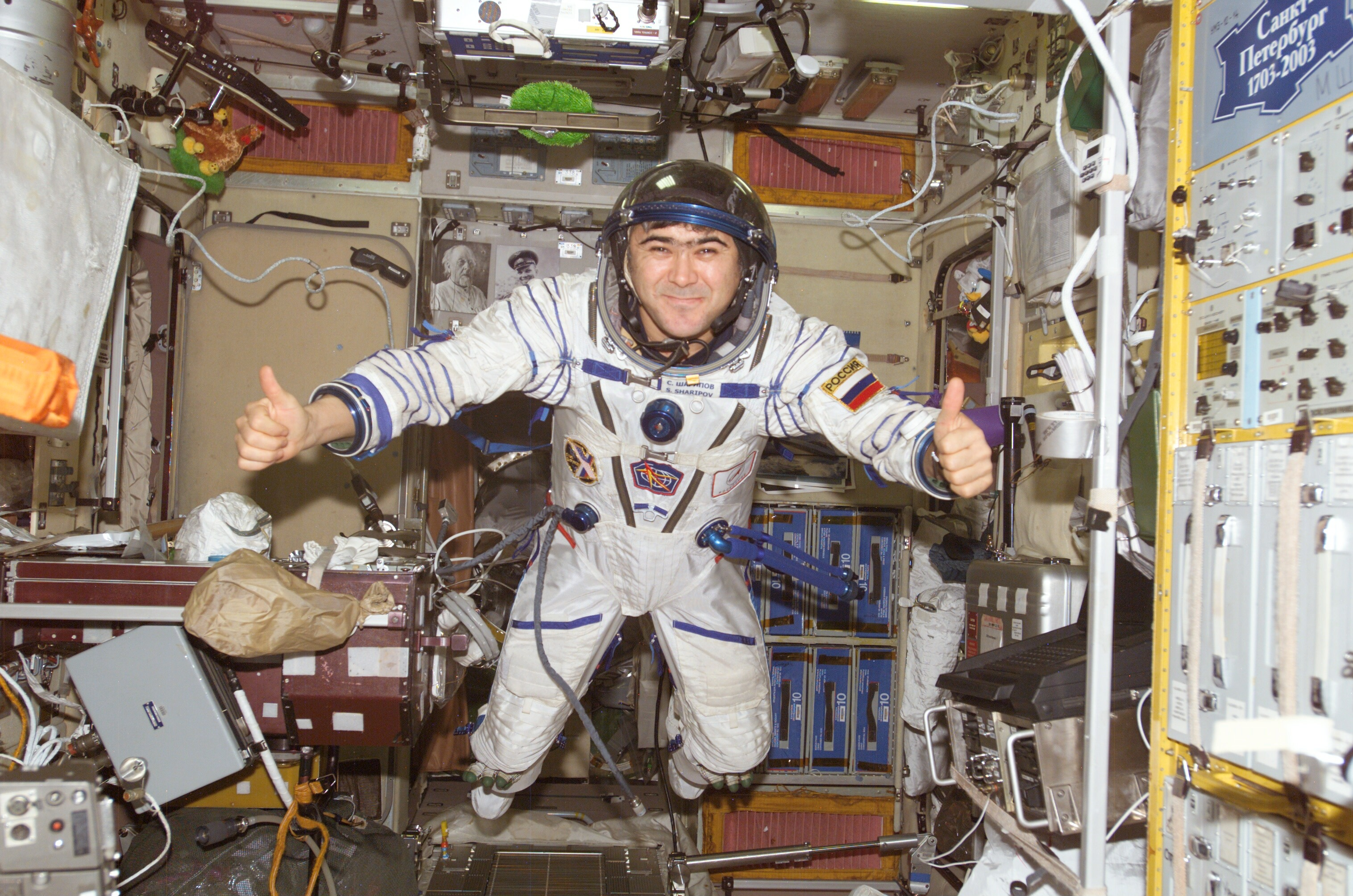
Salizhan Sharipov floats in the Zvezda service module of the ISS.

Selected by the Gagarin Cosmonaut Training Center (GCTC) Sharipov became a cosmonaut-candidate in 1990. In 1992, he completed general space training and became a test cosmonaut on 11 March 1992. As a member of the group he completed a full course of training for Mir spaceflights as a crew commander. From August 1997 to January 1998 he passed training as a member of the STS-89 crew at the Johnson Space Center.

=== STS-89 ===
Sharipov served as a mission specialist on the crew of STS-89 (22–31 January 1998), the eighth Shuttle-Mir docking mission during which the crew transferred more than 8,000 pounds of scientific equipment, logistical hardware and water from Space Shuttle Endeavour to Mir. In the fifth and last exchange of a U.S. astronaut, STS-89 delivered Andy Thomas to Mir and returned with David Wolf. Mission duration was 8 days, 19 hours and 47 seconds, traveling 3.6 million miles in 138 orbits of the Earth.

=== Expedition 10 ===
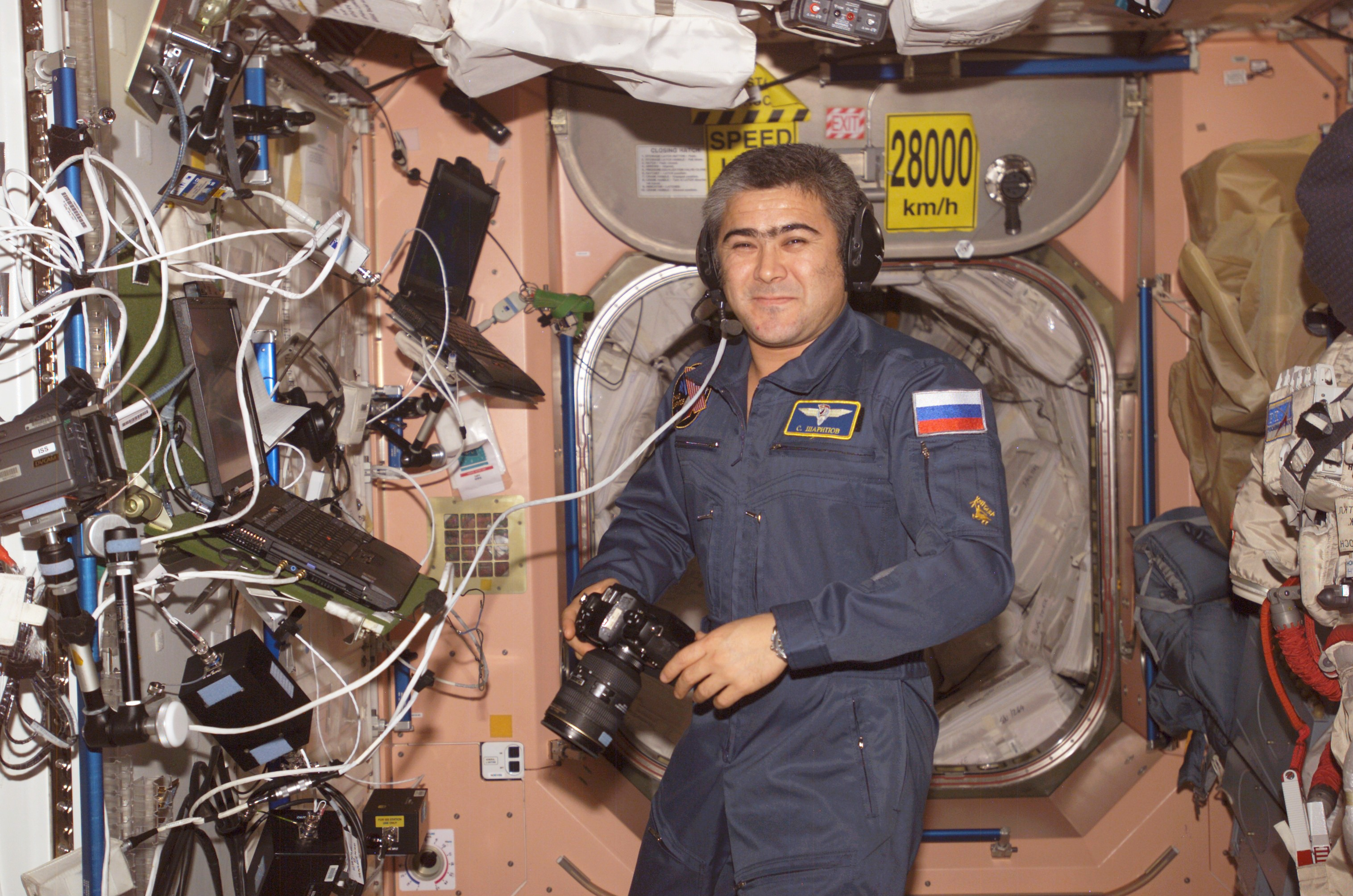
Sharipov using a communication system in the Unity node of the ISS.

Sharipov was also flight engineer on Expedition 10 to the International Space Station (ISS). The Soyuz TMA-5 spacecraft carrying Sharipov, cosmonaut Yuri Shargin and NASA astronaut Leroy Chiao lifted off from the Baikonour cosmodrome on 14 October 2004 at 03:06 UTC. After two days of autonomous flight the Soyuz spacecraft docking with the ISS on 16 October at 4:16 UTC. Sharipov joined the Expedition 10 crew as a flight engineer. The main task of Expedition 10 was to support ISS in functional condition. During his stay, Sharipov conducted several science and human life sciences experiments for the Russian Space Program. One experiment called SRS, which was a low-temperature synthesis in space hoped to develop new materials. Biotechnological experiments he performed used stem cells for possible development of a vaccination for HIV/AIDS treatment. He also participated in ecology studies of the Earth from space.

After spending 192 days in space, Sharipov returned to Earth on 24 April 2005 with Leroy Chiao and ESA astronaut Roberto Vittori aboard the Soyuz TMA-5 spacecraft. The Soyuz capsule landed at 22:08 UTC 90 km north of the town of Arkalyk.

=== Spacewalks ===
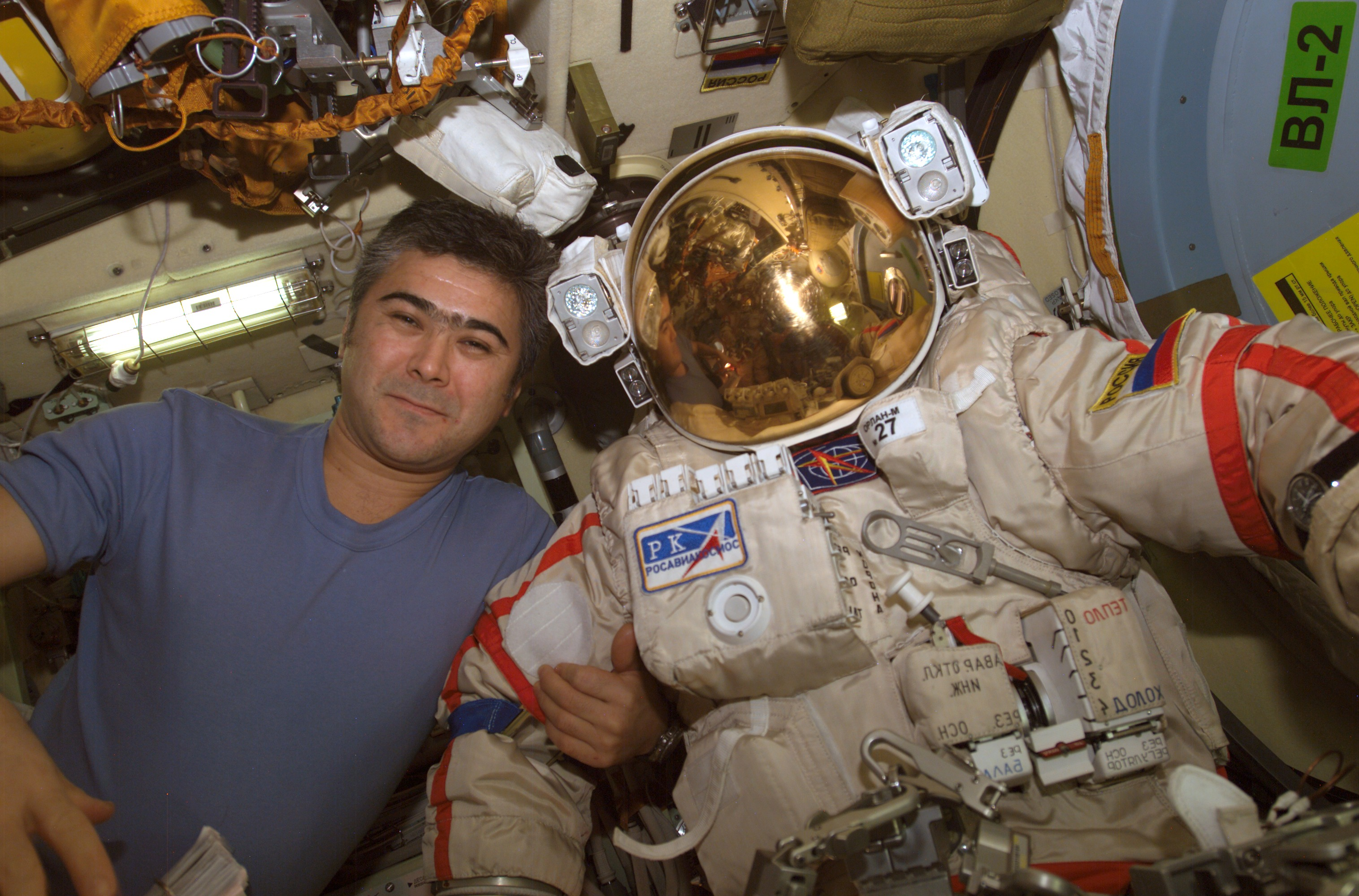
Salizhan Sharipov, Expedition 10 flight engineer poses with his Orlan spacesuit in the Pirs Docking Compartment of the ISS.

Sharipov has conducted two career spacewalks totalling 10 hours and 34 minutes.

Sharipov conducted his first career spacewalk on 26 January 2005. He and NASA astronaut Leroy Chiao ventured outside the ISS at 7:43 GMT from the Pirs airlock. The spacewalk was conducted in Russian Orlan spacesuits with red stripes. The two spacewalkers worked swiftly to complete their spacewalk goals that included the installation of a new work platform and test robot outside the Zvezda module. Sharipov and Chiao also relocated a Japanese space environment exposure experiment called MPAC SEEDS and plugged in an antenna for the robot test bed. They also studied ISS vents used by the station's Elektron oxygen generator and other life support systems. During the spacewalk, the space station's stabilizing gyroscopes repeatedly became overloaded with a mysterious torque, and they had to be relieved periodically by firing rocket thrusters located on the Russian half of the ISS. On at least one occasion these thrusters appeared to have been activated when the Sharipov and Chiao were working dangerously close to them. The spacewalk lasted 5 hours and 28 minutes.

Sharipov conducted his second career spacewalk on 28 March 2005. The spacewalk, in Russian Orlan suits using the airlock of the Pirs Docking Compartment began at 1:25 a.m. EST. After opening the hatch and assembling equipment, Sharipov and astronaut Leroy Chiao moved to the small-diameter forward end of the Zvezda module. There the two spacewalkers installed the final three antennas on the Zvezda Service Module of a six-antenna set for the resupply spacecraft ATV. Installation of the antennas and their associated cabling took about two hours. Sharipov and Chiao also installed a Global Positioning System (GPS) antenna for the ATV. During this spacewalk, Sharipov and Chiao deployed a small Russian experiment called Nanosatellite. Sharipov deployed it from the ladder at Pirs, giving it a push in the direction opposite the direction the ISS was traveling. The tiny satellite was about a foot long, weighs 11 pounds and contained a transmitter. The two spacewalkers activated the satellite before leaving the Pirs airlock and stowed it on the outside of the docking compartment. The object of the experiment was to develop small satellite control techniques, monitor satellite operations and develop new attitude system sensors. The spacewalk lasted 4 hours and 30 minutes.

== See also ==
- List of Heroes of the Russian Federation
