= Van Holsbeeck =

Van Holsbeeck is a surname. Notable people with the surname include:

- Joe Van Holsbeeck (died 2006), Belgian murder victim
- Marnix Van Holsbeeck (born 1957), Belgian radiologist
