= Marnix Van Holsbeeck =

Marnix van Holsbeeck
- Born: January 17, 1957; Roeselare
- Education: Catholic University of Leuven
- Scientific career
- Workplaces: Henry Ford Hospital

Marnix van Holsbeeck (born 1957) is the director of musculoskeletal radiology in the Department of Radiology and director of radiology in the Department of Orthopaedic Surgery at the Henry Ford Health System. He is an authority in the field of musculoskeletal radiology.

Van Holsbeeck received his undergraduate degree in medical sciences, and post-graduate degree at the renowned Catholic University of Leuven, Belgium. He completed a residency in radiology, followed by a fellowship in musculoskeletal radiology at the University Hospitals in Gasthuisberg, Belgium. He left for the United States in 1989. Dr. Van Holsbeeck was a senior lecturer at the Catholic University of Louvain, Belgium and a visiting assistant professor of radiology at the University of Michigan. He serves as primary diagnostic consultant for numerous professional sports teams including the Detroit Tigers, Detroit Red Wings, and Detroit Lions. He has investigated the use of dynamic ultrasonography to detect sports hernia injuries and is the primary investigator for an ongoing, collaborative research project with the United States Olympic Committee and Henry Ford Hospital, which is evaluating the use of ultrasound to diagnose sports injuries in female hockey players. He is also a consultant and co-researcher for NASA and the National Space and Biomedical Research Institute (NSBRI) in the Advanced Diagnostic Ultrasound in Microgravity Project, which involves teaching ultrasound to the astronaut and cosmonaut crews of the International Space Station to use for medical emergencies. This work has been modified for use on the Earth where his team supports the on-site care of professional sports teams and United States Olympic Committee athletes, Summer and Winter Olympic Games, and the Wayne State University School of Medicine. Van Holsbeeck has been elected to numerous professional organizations and national positions including the Radiologic Society of North America, the American Institute of Ultrasound in Medicine, International Skeletal Society, Musculoskeletal Ultrasound Society, and the Society of Skeletal Radiologists. Van Holsbeeck has received numerous teaching and professional awards including the President's Medal of the International Skeletal Society and the Belgian Radiologic Society. He serves as a senior reviewer for numerous medical journals and on the editorial board for Ultrasound Quarterly and the Journal of Clinical Ultrasound. He has written over 100 peer-reviewed articles, and is the first author for a leading radiology textbook, Musculoskeletal Ultrasound.
