= John L. Phillips =

American astronaut (born 1951)

John Phillips
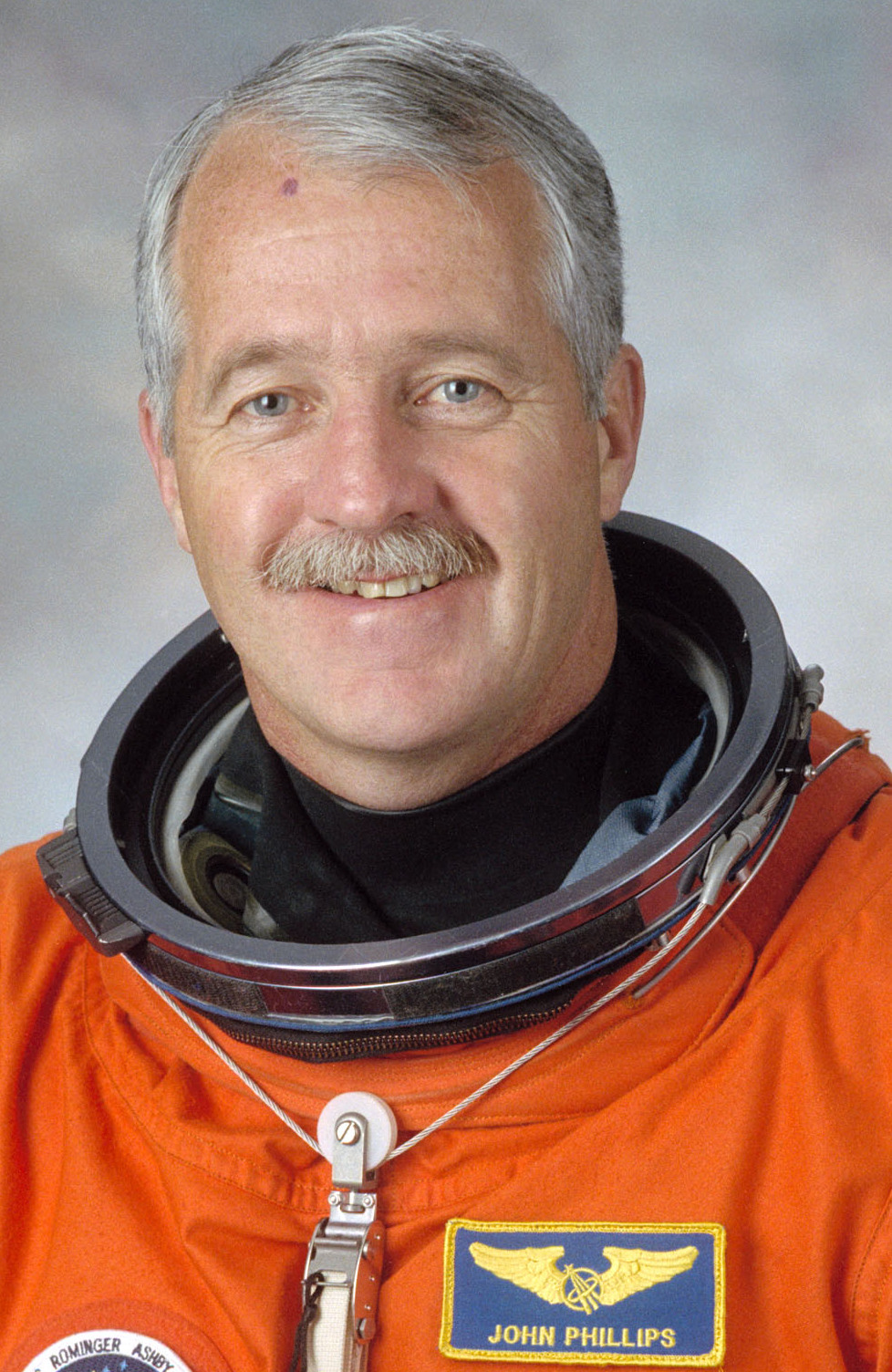
- Phillips in 2001
- Born: John Lynch Phillips; April 15, 1951 (age 75); Fort Belvoir, Virginia, U.S.
- Education: United States Naval Academy (BS); University of West Florida (MS); University of California, Los Angeles (MS, PhD)
- Space career

NASA astronaut
- Rank: Captain, USNR
- Time in space: 203d 17h 22m
- Selection: NASA Group 16 (1996)
- Total EVAs: 1 (during Expedition 11)
- Total EVA time: 4h, 58m
- Missions: STS-100; Soyuz TMA-6 (Expedition 11); STS-119
- Scientific career
- Fields: Astronomy
- Thesis: Interplanetary Magnetic Field Effects on the Interaction of the Solar Wind with Venus (1987)

John Lynch Phillips (born April 15, 1951) is a NASA astronaut. Phillips is also a Naval Aviator and retired captain, United States Navy Reserve. Phillips has received numerous awards and special honors. He is a National Merit Scholar, graduated 2nd in his class of 906 people at the U.S. Naval Academy in 1972. Phillips has also been awarded the NASA Space Flight Medal, NASA Distinguished Service Medal, the Gagarin Medal and several others. Phillips has logged over 4,400 flight hours and 250 aircraft carrier landings, flying the A-7 Corsair II carrier-based light attack aircraft while on active duty in the Regular Navy and subsequently during his time as a Navy Reservist from 1982 to 2002. At the time of his retirement, Phillips had retained the rank of captain.

== Biography ==
Born April 15, 1951, in Fort Belvoir, Virginia, but considers Scottsdale, Arizona to be his hometown. He is married to the former Laura Jean Doell of Scotia, New York. They have two children.

He graduated from Scottsdale High School, Scottsdale, Arizona, in 1966. He received a Bachelor of Science degree in mathematics and Russian from the United States Naval Academy in 1972; a Master of Science degree in aeronautical systems from the University of West Florida in 1974; a Master of Science degree and a doctorate in geophysics and space physics from the University of California, Los Angeles (UCLA) in 1984 and 1987 respectively.

A National Merit Scholar; he graduated second of 906 in the class of 1972 at U.S. Naval Academy; received 2 NASA Group Achievement Awards for contributions to the Ulysses Spacecraft Mission and the Los Alamos National Laboratory Distinguished Performance Award in 1996. Awarded the NASA Space Flight Medal and various military awards.

Phillips received a commission as an ensign in the U.S. Navy upon graduation from the U.S. Naval Academy in 1972 and was designated a Naval Aviator in November 1974, concurrent with his completion of an MS degree in aeronautical systems from the University of West Florida. He trained in the A-7 Corsair aircraft at Naval Air Station Lemoore, California and made overseas deployment with Attack Squadron 155 (VA-155) aboard the aircraft carriers USS Oriskany and USS Franklin D. Roosevelt. Subsequent tours of duty included Navy Recruiting Command duty in Albany, New York, and flying the CT-39 Sabreliner aircraft at Naval Air Station North Island, California.

After leaving the Regular Navy and transferring to the Naval Reserve in 1982, Phillips enrolled as a graduate student at UCLA. While at UCLA he carried out research involving observations by the NASA Pioneer Venus Spacecraft. Upon completing his doctorate in 1987, he was awarded a J. Robert Oppenheimer Postdoctoral Fellowship at Los Alamos National Laboratory in New Mexico. He accepted a career position at Los Alamos in 1989. While there, Phillips performed research on the sun and the space environment. From 1993 through 1996 he was Principal Investigator for the Solar Wind Plasma Experiment aboard the Ulysses Spacecraft as it executed a unique trajectory over the poles of the sun. He has authored 156 scientific papers dealing with the plasma environments of the sun, earth, other planets, comets and spacecraft.

Phillips has logged over 4,400 flight hours and 250 carrier landings. He was a Navy Reservist from 1982 to 2002, serving as an A-7 pilot, and in various non-flying assignments. He holds the rank of captain, USN (retired).

== NASA ==
Selected by NASA in April 1996, Phillips reported to the Johnson Space Center in August 1996. After completing astronaut candidate training, he held various jobs in the Astronaut Office, including systems engineering and CAPCOM for the International Space Station (ISS). He served as a backup crew-member for ISS Expedition 7.

=== Spaceflight experience ===
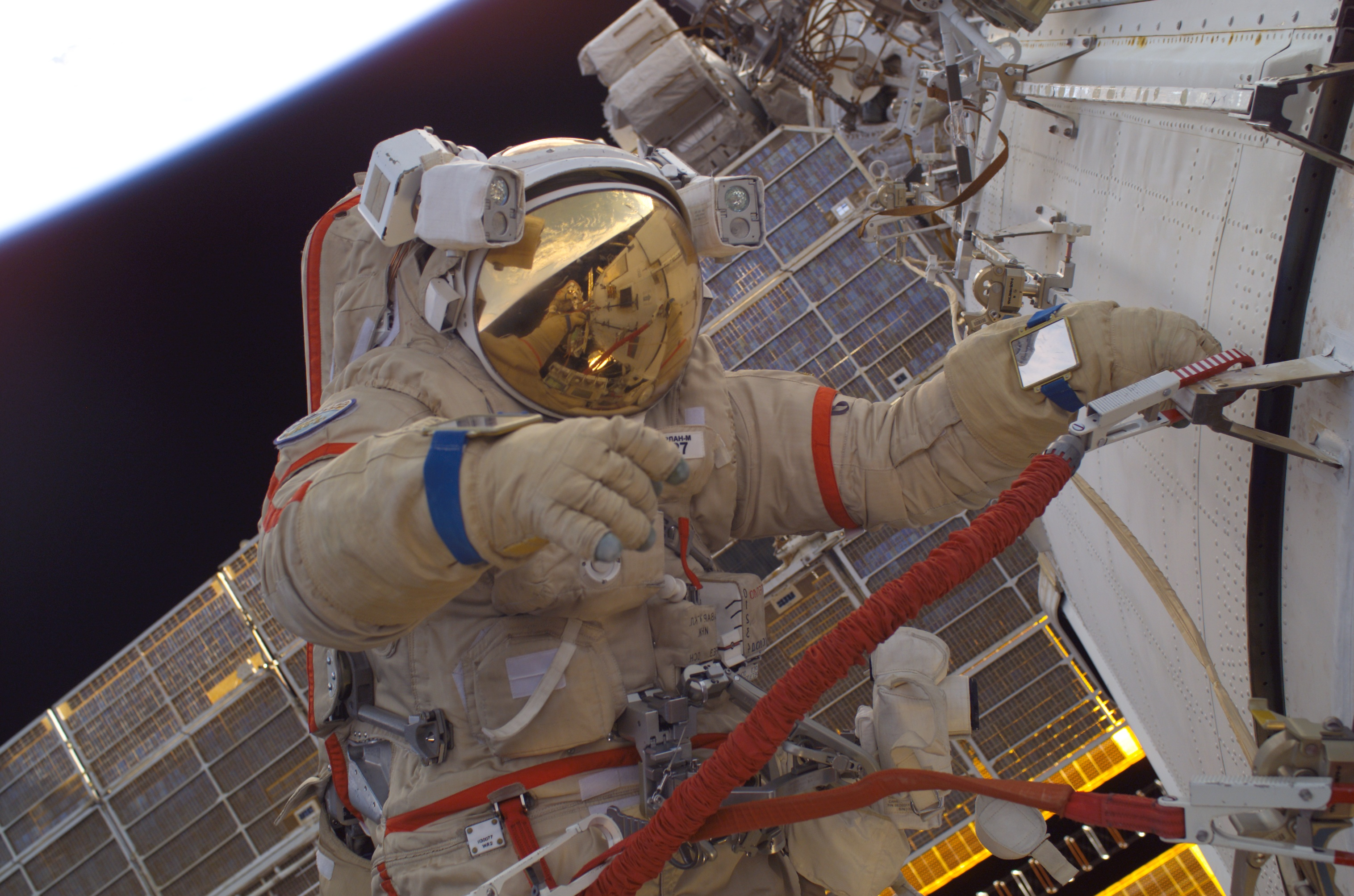
Attired in a Russian Orlan spacesuit, Phillips participates in a spacewalk.

STS-100 (Space Shuttle Endeavour, April 19 to May 1, 2001).
STS-100 was a 12-day mission to the ISS. During the mission, the crew successfully delivered and installed the Canadarm2 Robotic Arm. They also delivered experiments and supplies aboard the Multi-Purpose Logistics Module Raffaello on its maiden flight. Phillips was the Ascent/Entry Flight engineer and was the intravehicular activity coordinator during two spacewalks.

Expedition 11 (April 15 to October 11, 2005).
Expedition 11 was a six-month mission to the ISS.
On April 15, 2005, Phillips, along with his fellow crew-members Sergei Krikalev, and Roberto Vittori launched to the ISS aboard Soyuz TMA-6.
On June 14, 2005, Phillips became the first person to testify before Congress from the ISS, or outer space in general. He gave testimony to the United States House of Representatives Science Space Subcommittee via a live video feed. The hearing was to evaluate the space station's usefulness as an orbiting laboratory.
On August 18, 2005, Phillips and Krikalev completed a five-hour spacewalk to retrieve several experiments and install a video camera for the new docking procedure.
Phillips and Krikalev, along with Space Flight Participant Gregory Olsen, returned to Earth aboard Soyuz TMA-6 on October 11, 2005.

STS-119 (Space Shuttle Discovery, March 15 to 28, 2009).
STS-119 was a 12-day mission to the ISS flown during March 2009. It delivered and assembled the fourth starboard Integrated Truss Segment (S6), and the fourth set of solar arrays and batteries to the station. The launch took place on March 15, 2009. Discovery successfully landed on March 28, 2009.

Phillips was detailed to the U.S. Naval Postgraduate School in Monterey, California, from 2009 to 2011 as the Smith/McCool NASA Chair Professor.

== Awards and decorations ==
NASA Distinguished Service Medal
NASA Space Flight Medal with two award stars
National Defense Service Medal with two service stars
Navy Sea Service Deployment Ribbon
Navy Recruiting Service Ribbon
