= Soyuz TMA-5 =

2004 Russian crewed spaceflight to the ISS

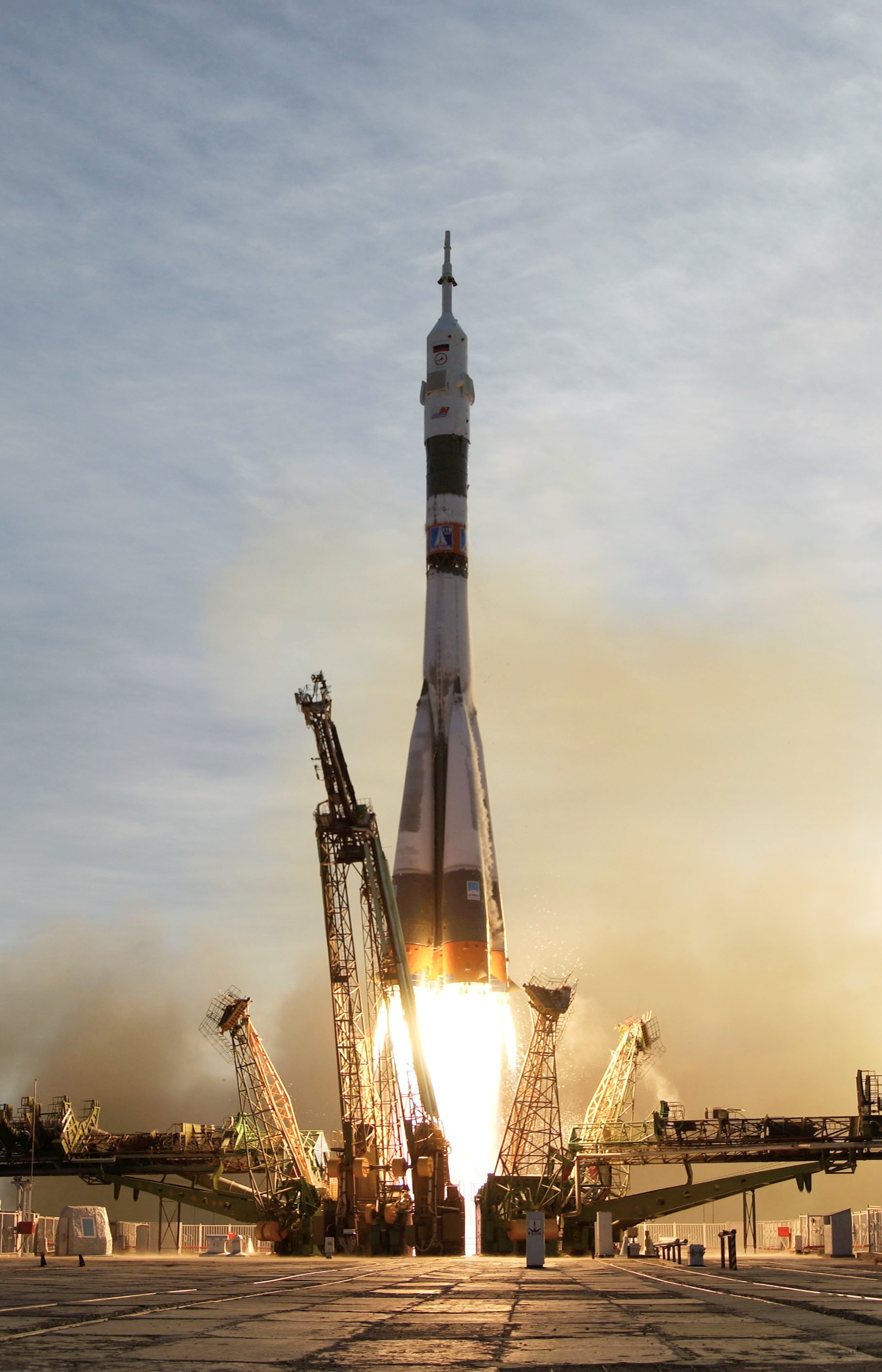
- Soyuz TMA-5 launch
- Operator: Roscosmos
- COSPAR ID: 2004-040A
- SATCAT no.: 28444
- Mission duration: 192 days, 19 hours, 2 minutes
- Orbits completed: ~2,900

Spacecraft properties
- Spacecraft type: Soyuz-TMA 11F732
- Manufacturer: Energia

Crew
- Crew size: 3
- Members: Salizhan Sharipov; Leroy Chiao
- Launching: Yuri Shargin
- Landing: Roberto Vittori
- Callsign: Tyan-Shan ("Heavenly Mountains")

Start of mission
- Launch date: October 14, 2004, 03:06 UTC
- Rocket: Soyuz-FG
- Launch site: Baikonur 1/5

End of mission
- Landing date: April 24, 2005, 22:08 UTC
- Landing site: 90 kilometres (56 mi) north of the town of Arkalyk

Orbital parameters
- Reference system: Geocentric
- Regime: Low Earth
- Perigee altitude: ~200 kilometres (120 mi)
- Apogee altitude: ~252 kilometres (157 mi)
- Inclination: ~51.7 degrees
- Period: ~88.7 minutes

Docking with ISS
- Docking port: Pirs nadir
- Docking date: 16 October 2004; 04:16 UTC
- Undocking date: 29 November 2004; 09:29 UTC
- Time docked: 33d 5h 13m

Docking with ISS (Relocation)
- Docking port: Zarya nadir
- Docking date: 29 November 2004; 09:53 UTC
- Undocking date: 24 April 2005; 18:44 UTC
- Time docked: 146d 8h 51m
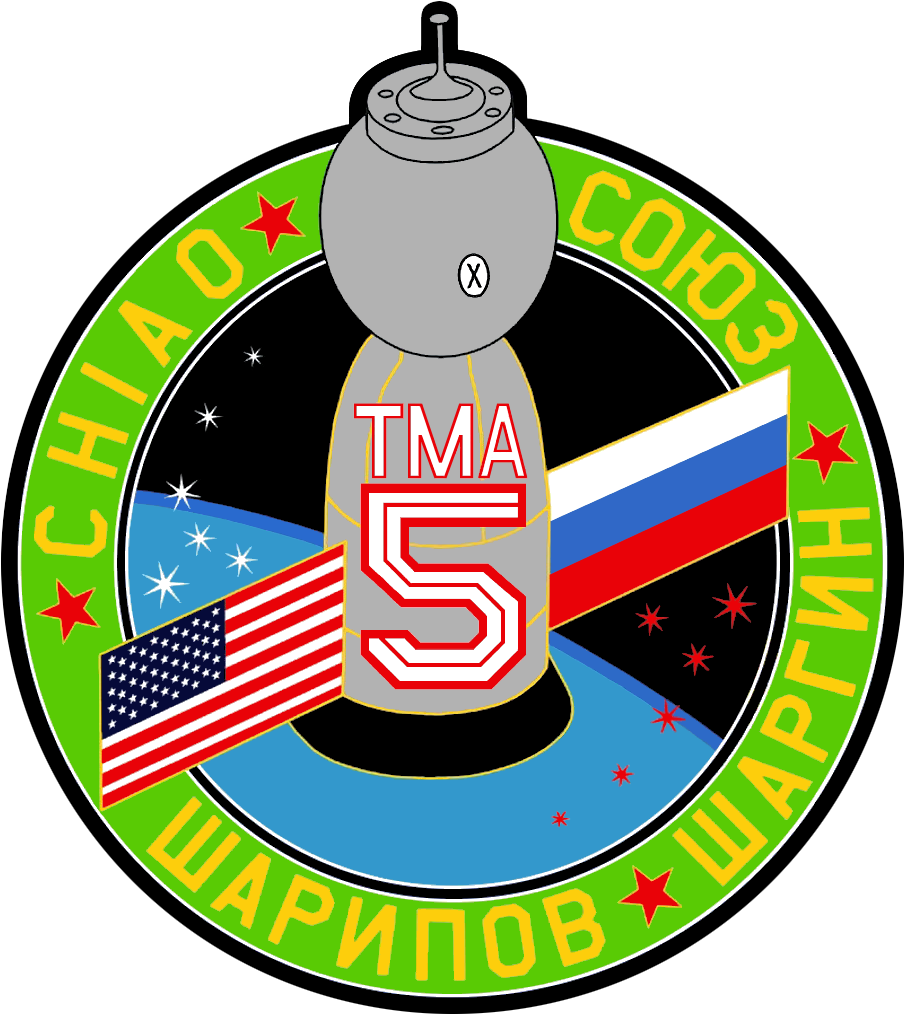
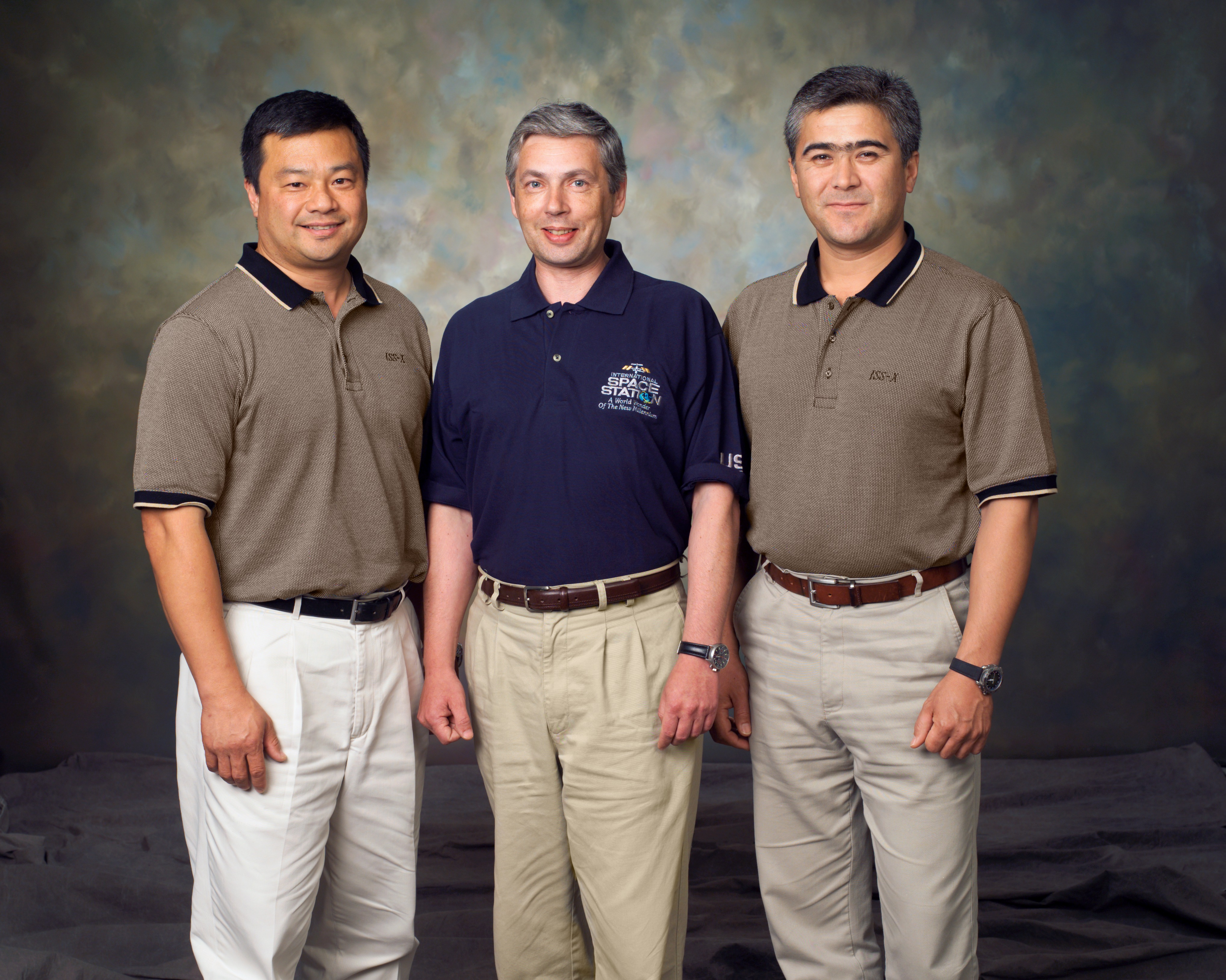
- From left to right: Chiao, Shargin and Sharipov Soyuz programme (Crewed missions)

Soyuz TMA-5 was a Soyuz mission to the International Space Station (ISS) launched by a Soyuz-FG launch vehicle.

== Crew ==
Position	Launching crew	Landing crew
Commander	(Russia) Salizhan Sharipov, Roscosmos; Expedition 10; Second and last spaceflight	
Flight Engineer	(United States) Leroy Chiao, NASA; Expedition 10; Fourth and last spaceflight	
Flight Engineer	(Russia) Yuri Shargin, Roscosmos; Only spaceflight	(Italy) Roberto Vittori, ESA; Second spaceflight

TMA 5 ISS 10 Crew patches were designed by Seán O'Mara for USSR Airspace.

== Docking with ISS ==
- Docked to ISS: October 16, 2004, 04:16 UTC (to Pirs module)
- Undocked from ISS: November 29, 2004, 09:29 UTC (from Pirs module)
- Docked to ISS: November 29, 2004, 09:53 UTC (to nadir port of Zarya)
- Undocked from ISS: April 24, 2005, 18:44 UTC (from nadir port of Zarya)

== Mission highlights ==
25th crewed flight to ISS.

Soyuz TMA-5 is a Soyuz spacecraft that was launched on October 14, 2004, by a Soyuz-FG rocket from Baikonur Cosmodrome.

The Expedition 10 crew, Leroy Chiao of the US and Salizhan Sharipov of Russia replaced the Expedition 9 crew, Gennady Padalka - Cdr. Russia and Edward Fincke U.S.A.

The launch of Expedition 10 was delayed beyond its scheduled October 9, 2004 launch date. During preflight testing, an explosive bolt was accidentally activated on the Soyuz TMA-5 spacecraft. The resulting damage was repaired prior to launch.

The docking maneuver had to be done manually, as the approach by the automatic system was too fast.

The undocking was done manually as well, as a cautionary measure to save power on a faulty battery.

After 193 days in the station the Expedition 10 crew returned to a soft landing in Kazakhstan together with Italian Roberto Vittori who had flown up with the Expedition 11 crew on Soyuz TMA-6.
