= Ultrasound Quarterly =

Quarterly academic journal covering medical ultrasound

- Subject: Medical ultrasound
- Language: English
- Edited by: Theodore J. Dubinsky

Publication details
- History: 1988–present
- Publisher: Lippincott Williams & Wilkins
- Frequency: Quarterly
- Impact factor: 1.021 (2017)

Standard abbreviations
- ISO 4: Ultrasound Q.

Indexing
- CODEN: ULQUEZ
- ISSN: 0894-8771 (print); 1536-0253 (web)
- OCLC no.: 884087226

Links
- Journal homepage; Online access; Online archive

Ultrasound Quarterly is a quarterly peer-reviewed medical journal covering research on medical ultrasound. It was established in 1988 and is published by Lippincott Williams & Wilkins on behalf of the Society of Radiologists in Ultrasound, of which it is the official journal. The editor-in-chief is Theodore J. Dubinsky. According to the Journal Citation Reports, the journal has a 2017 impact factor of 1.021, ranking it 108th out of 126 journals in the category "Radiology, Nuclear Medicine, and Medical Imaging".
