= Leroy Chiao =

American engineer, astronaut, entrepreneur, speaker and engineering consultant (born 1960)

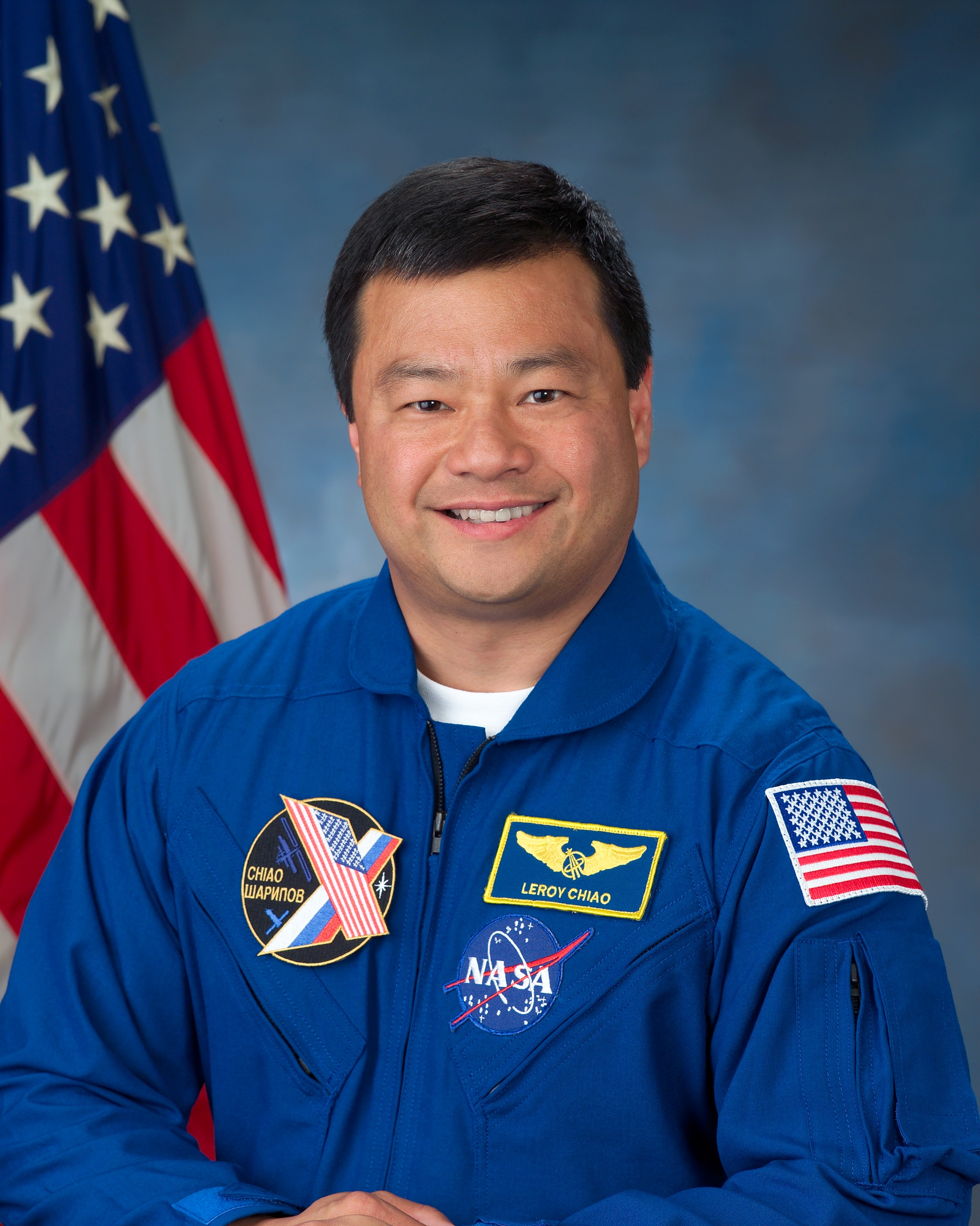
- Official portrait, 2005
- Born: August 28, 1960 (age 66); Milwaukee, Wisconsin, U.S.
- Education: University of California, Berkeley (BS); University of California, Santa Barbara (MS, PhD)
- Space career

NASA astronaut
- Time in space: 229d 7h 38m
- Selection: NASA Group 13 (1990)
- Total EVAs: 6
- Total EVA time: 36h 7m
- Missions: STS-65; STS-72; STS-92; Soyuz TMA-5 (Expedition 10)
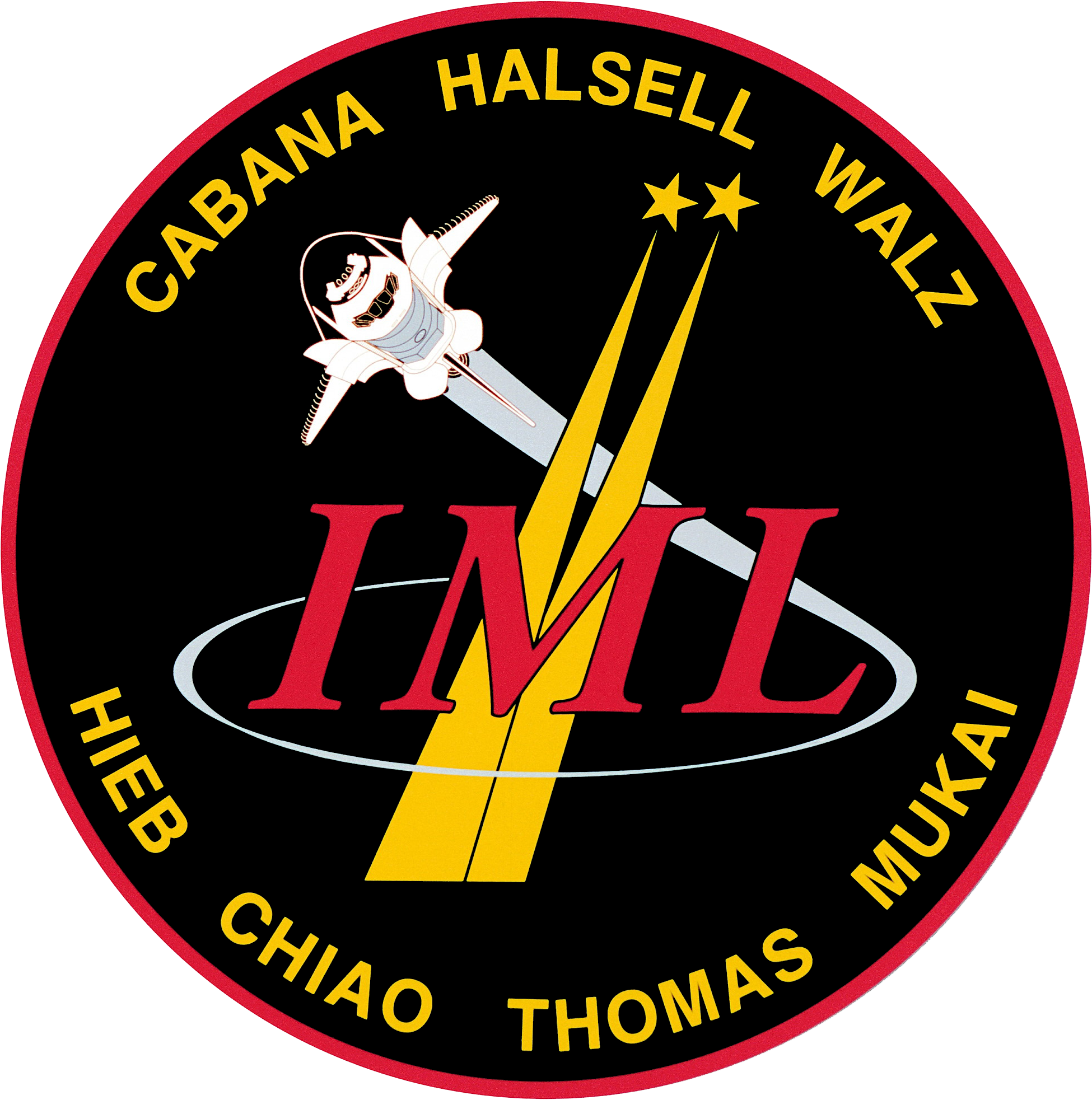
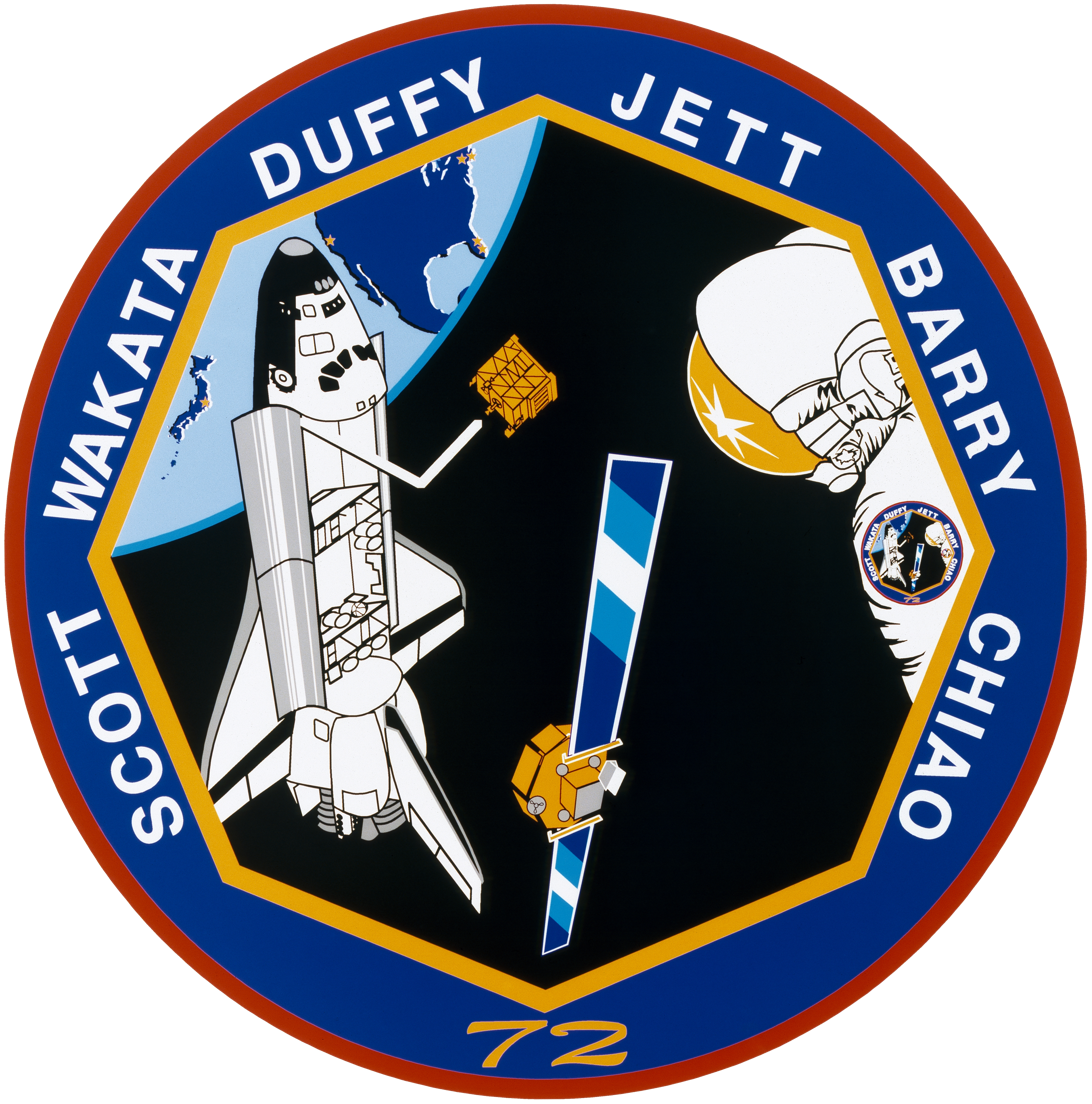
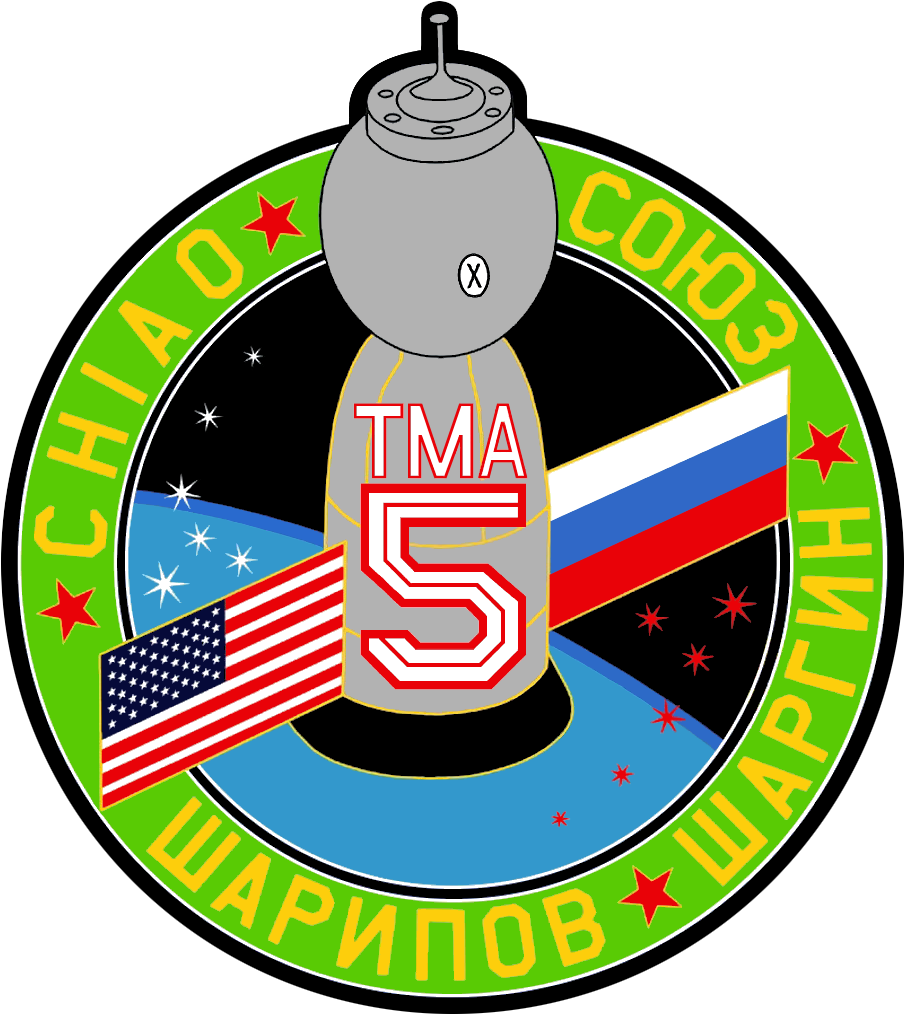
- Mission insignia
- Retired: December 5, 2005

Chinese name
- Chinese: 焦立中
- Hanyu Pinyin: Jiāo Lìzhōng
- Website: Official website

Leroy Chiao (Chinese: 焦立中; born August 28, 1960) is an American chemical engineer, retired NASA astronaut, entrepreneur, motivational speaker, and engineering consultant. Chiao flew on three Space Shuttle flights, and was the commander of Expedition 10, where he lived on board the International Space Station from October 13, 2004 to April 24, 2005. He is also a co-author and researcher for the Advanced Diagnostic Ultrasound in Microgravity project.

== Early life and education ==
Chiao was born to a Taiwanese American family in Milwaukee, Wisconsin. He was raised in Danville, California. His parents are Taiwanese waishengren who were born in Shandong province in mainland China but moved to Taiwan. They met while studying at a Taiwanese university in the 1950s before immigrating to the U.S.

Chiao graduated from Monte Vista High School in Danville in 1978. In 1983, he earned a Bachelor of Science in chemical engineering from the University of California, Berkeley. He later earned a Master of Science (M.S.) and a Doctor of Philosophy (Ph.D.) in chemical engineering from the University of California, Santa Barbara in 1985 and 1987, respectively.

Chiao's parents were chemical engineers who immigrated to Milwaukee from the Republic of China in the late 1950s for graduate school. Stressing a high doctorate-level science education, his parents encouraged him to follow their lead and become an engineer. Chiao's aviator call sign is "Shandong," the name of the Chinese province where his parents grew up.

== Pre-NASA career ==
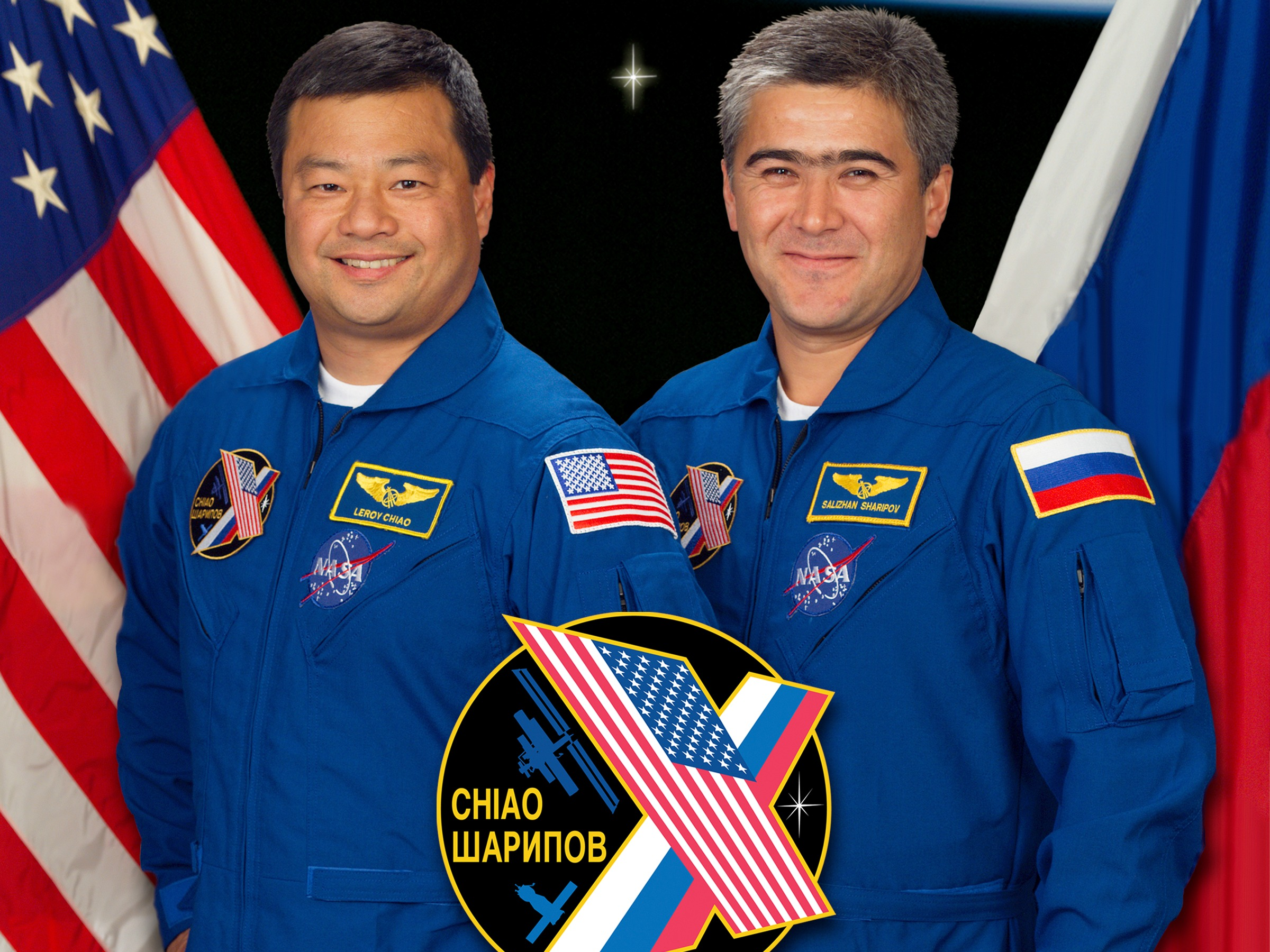
NASA astronaut Leroy Chiao, left, and Russian cosmonaut Salizhan Sharipov served on Expedition 10 in the International Space Station.

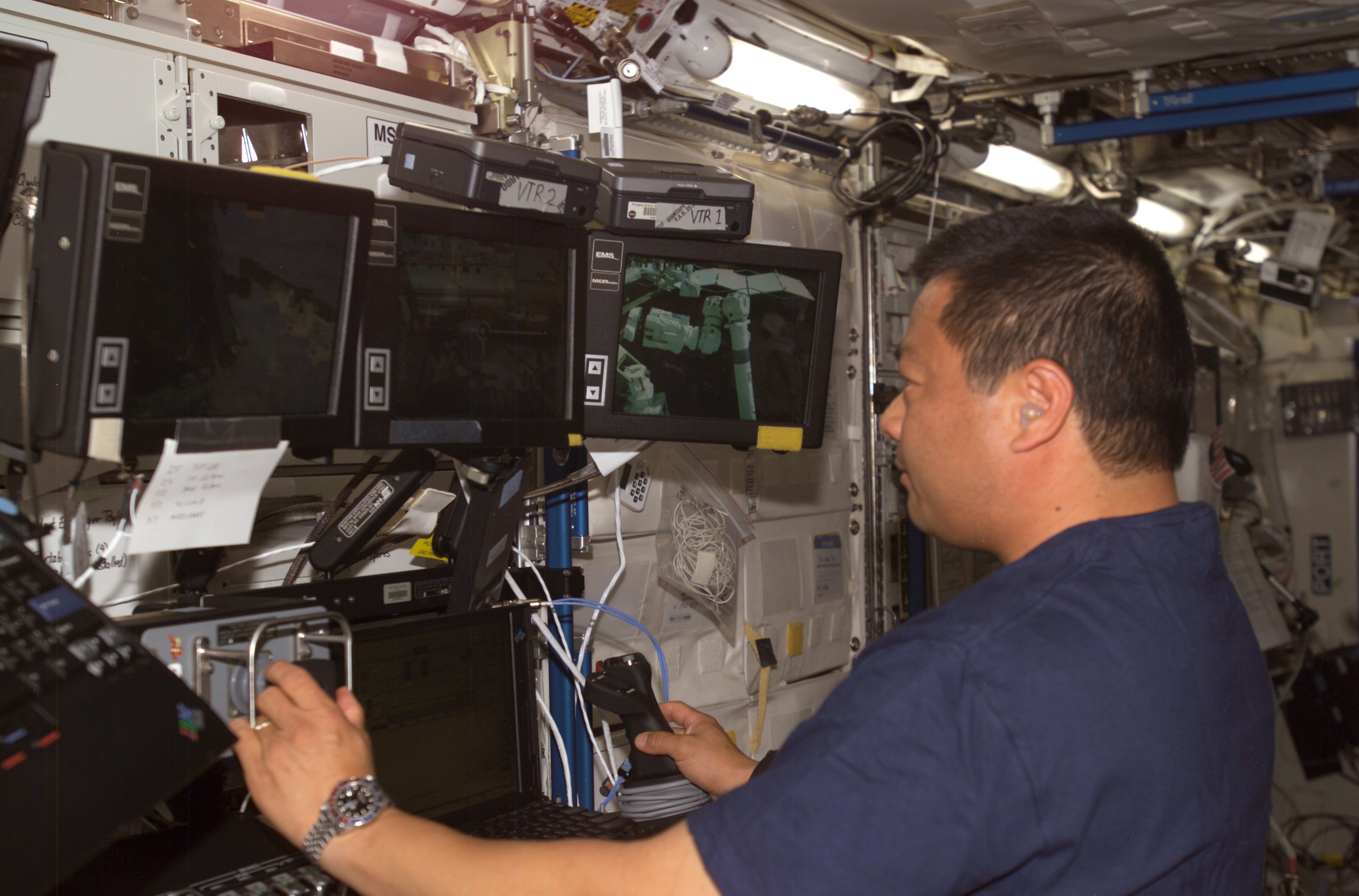
Astronaut Leroy Chiao works with the controls of the Canadarm2

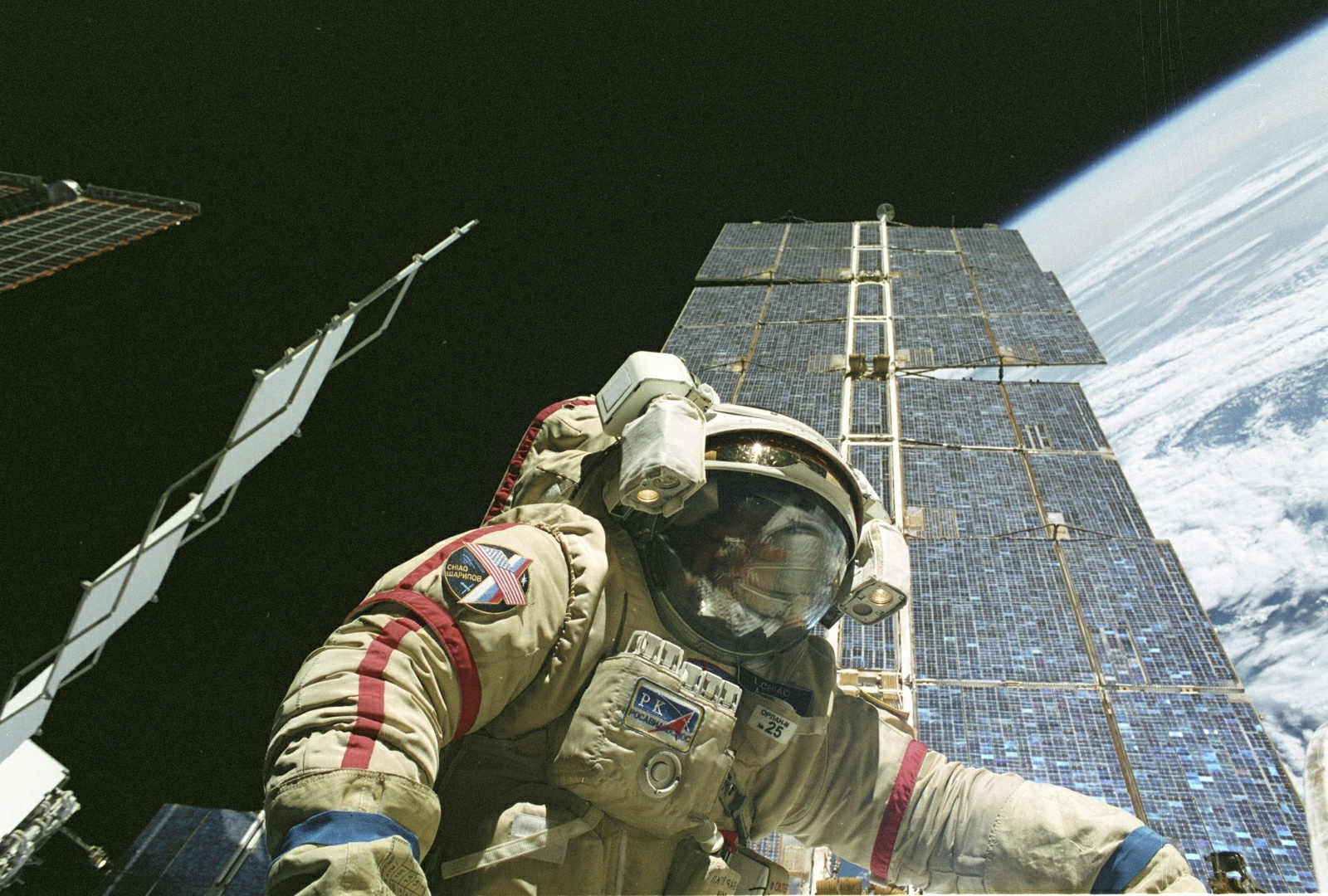
Astronaut Leroy Chiao, Expedition 10 commander and NASA ISS science officer, wearing a Russian Orlan spacesuit, participates in the first of two sessions of extravehicular activities (EVA) performed by the Expedition 10 crew during their six-month mission.

Upon graduation, Chiao joined the Hexcel Corporation in Dublin, California from 1987 to 1989. He was involved in process, manufacturing, and engineering research on advanced aerospace materials, and worked on a joint NASA-JPL/Hexcel project to develop a practical, optically correct, precision segment reflector made entirely of advanced polymer composite materials for future space telescopes, as well as working on cure modeling and finite element analysis. In January 1989, Chiao joined the Lawrence Livermore National Laboratory in Livermore, California, where he was involved in processing research for the fabrication of filament-wound and thick-section aerospace composites. Chiao also developed and demonstrated a mechanistic cure model for graphite fiber and epoxy composite material (see Graphite-reinforced plastic). An instrument-rated pilot, Chiao has logged over 3300 flight hours in a variety of aircraft.

== NASA career ==
At age 29, Chiao was selected by NASA in January 1990 (the youngest in Group 13) and became an astronaut in July 1991. He qualified for flight assignment as a mission specialist. His technical assignments included: Space Shuttle flight software verification in the Shuttle Avionics Integration Laboratory (SAIL); crew equipment, Spacelab, Spacehab, and payload issues for the Astronaut Office Mission Development Branch; training and flight data file issues; and extravehicular activity (EVA) issues for the EVA Branch. Chiao is Chief of the Astronaut Office EVA Branch.

A veteran of four space flights, Chiao flew as a mission specialist on STS-65 in 1994, STS-72 in 1996 and STS-92 in 2000. Chiao had logged over 36 days and 12.5 hours in space, including over 26 EVA hours in four spacewalks, before his mission aboard the International Space Station.

Chiao is fluent in Mandarin Chinese. Additionally, Chiao also learned Russian to communicate with Russian cosmonauts as part of the International Space Station program. On November 2, 2004, Chiao voted in the 2004 United States presidential election while aboard the International Space Station, making him the first American to vote in a presidential election while in space. McDonald's presented Chiao with a Big Mac and French fries at their branch in Star City as one of his first meals since returning to Earth after his ISS assignment. Among the souvenirs he brought into space in his previous space flights were a Chinese flag and a quartz-carved rose from Hong Kong.

Chiao was the inadvertent developer of the procedure to use the IRED (Interim Resistive Exercise Device) to excite the solar arrays of the ISS. During an exercise session of squats on the ISS, Chiao sent a vibration through the space station that caused the solar arrays to ripple – a low amplitude frequency response. When Chiao did this, the response from Mission Control was "knock it off." However, several years later during an ISS assembly flight in December 2006 (STS-116), German astronaut Thomas Reiter of the European Space Agency was told to do 30 seconds of robust exercise on the bungee-bar IRED machine to help retract ISS solar arrays, specifically to relieve tension in a wire system that was preventing the array from folding up like an accordion. An eventual unplanned spacewalk during the same shuttle mission retracted the array.

Chiao left NASA in December 2005 to pursue employment in the private sector.

=== Spaceflight experience ===
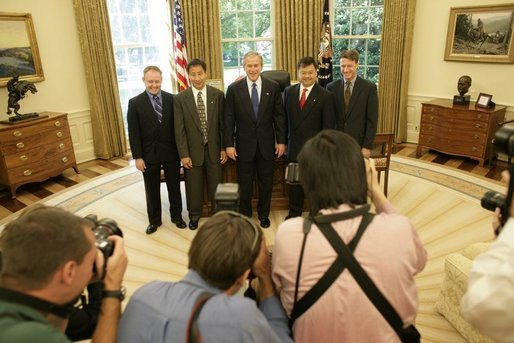
President George W. Bush welcomed the crew members and families of the International Space Station expeditions 7, 8, 9, and 10 to the Oval Office in May 2005. From left: Lt. Colonel Mike Fincke, ISS 9; Dr. Edward Lu, ISS 7; Dr. Leroy Chiao, ISS 10, and Dr. Michael Foale, ISS 8.

STS-65 Columbia (July 8–23, 1994) launched from and returned to land at the Kennedy Space Center, Florida, setting a new flight duration record for the Space Shuttle program at that time. The STS-65 mission flew the second International Microgravity Laboratory (IML-2). During the 15-day flight, the seven-member crew conducted more than 80 experiments focusing on materials and life sciences research in microgravity. The STS-65 mission was accomplished in 236 orbits of the Earth, traveling 6.1 million miles in 353 hours and 55 minutes.

STS-72 Endeavour (January 11–20, 1996) was a nine-day mission during which the crew retrieved the Space Flyer Unit (launched from Japan ten months earlier), and deployed and retrieved the OAST-Flyer. Chiao performed two spacewalks designed to demonstrate tools and hardware and evaluate techniques to be used in the assembly of the International Space Station. In completing this mission, Chiao logged 214 hours and 41 seconds in space, including just over thirteen EVA hours, and traveled 3.7 million miles in 142 orbits of the Earth.

STS-92 Discovery (October 11–24, 2000) was launched from the Kennedy Space Center, Florida, and returned to land at Edwards Air Force Base, California. During the 13-day flight, the seven-member crew attached the Z1 Truss and Pressurized Mating Adapter 3 to the International Space Station using Discovery's robotic arm and performed four spacewalks to configure these elements. This expansion of the ISS opened the door for future assembly missions and prepared the station for its first resident crew. Chiao totaled 13 hours and 16 minutes of EVA time in two spacewalks. The STS-92 mission was accomplished in 202 orbits, traveling 5.3 million miles in 12 days, 21 hours, 40 minutes, and 25 seconds.

ISS Expedition 10 (October 9, 2004 – April 24, 2005), Chiao was the commander of Expedition 10 on the International Space Station.

== Post-NASA career ==
After leaving NASA, Chiao became involved in entrepreneurial business ventures in the U.S. and China.

In early 2006, he joined the Atlanta firm of SpaceWorks Enterprises, Inc. (SEI) as an affiliate and technical advisor (on a non-exclusive basis). Dr. Chiao assists the firm on space technologies and operating processes for future space exploration concepts and research on the commercialization of space. In July 2006, Chiao accepted a position as the Executive Vice President for Space Operations and a Director of Excalibur Almaz Limited. He was responsible for operational aspects of spaceflight, including training for both the capsule and space station. The company assembled a team from the Isle of Man, the United States, Russia, Ukraine, and Continental Europe to begin work towards refurbishing and flying a capsule in space based upon the design of the Almaz capsules.

In March 2006, Chiao began an appointment in the mechanical engineering department at the Louisiana State University as the first Raborn Distinguished Chair Max Faget Professor.

Chiao was the chairman of the National Space Biomedical Research Institute (NSBRI) User Panel, which was headquartered at Baylor College of Medicine. The NSBRI, funded by NASA through 2017, was a consortium of institutions studying the health risks related to long-duration space flight. The Institute's User Panel served as an advisory board composed of former and current astronauts and flight surgeons that ensured NSBRI's research program was focused on astronaut health and safety. In preparation for lunar and Mars exploration, Chiao and the User Panel helped align NSBRI's science and technology projects with the needs of astronauts on long missions.

In July 2007, Chiao joined an expedition to visit Devon Island and conduct 5 days of webcasts and other instructional activities spanning the period of 16–20 July 2007. This activity was in collaboration with the Mars Institute, the Challenger Center for Space Science Education, The Explorers Club and SpaceRef Interactive, Inc. He conducted these webcasts from the Haughton-Mars Project Research Station and nearby locations to illustrate how NASA and other space agencies are learning to live on the Moon and Mars here on Earth.

Chiao appeared in an episode of MANswers in 2008 explaining how to neutralize an astronaut in space who has gone berserk.

In May 2009 Chiao wrote a few blog articles on Gizmodo.com detailing some of his space experiences.

In May 2009 Chiao was named as a member of the Review of United States Human Space Flight Plans Committee an independent review requested by the Office of Science and Technology Policy (OSTP) on May 7, 2009.

In a special to CNN written by Chiao on 1 September 2011, he suggested that China be permitted to join the International Space Station program to remedy the issue relating to the limited options available for space travel, following the conclusion of the United States space shuttle program, and a failure of a Russian Soyuz spacecraft on 24 August 2011.

From 2011–2016, Chiao worked for Epiphan Video as VP Aerospace. He is an advisor to the company. Based on NASA's space technologies, Epiphan Video produces high-resolution video capture, streaming, and recording products for the medical, educational, IT, and industrial markets. Chiao's role at Epiphan Video is to work with the aerospace industry to define the company's vision and achieve strategic goals in areas such as air traffic control.

From 2012–2016, Chiao was the special advisor – human spaceflight for the Space Foundation. He has been an advisor to the Houston Association of Space and Science Education since 2014. He is currently a co-founder and CEO of OneOrbit, a corporate keynote and training company, which also offers educational programs for schools and educators.

== Personal life ==
Chiao married his wife, Karen, in 2003. She is a photographer, and her father is Dutch. The couple has two children: twins Henry and Caroline. He divorced Karen in 2020. Chiao enjoys flying his Grumman Tiger aircraft, as well as downhill skiing. He speaks English, Mandarin Chinese, and Russian.

== Awards and honors ==
- NASA Distinguished Service Medal (2005)
- NASA Exceptional Service Medals (1996, 2000)
- NASA Individual Achievement Awards (2001, 2002, 2003, 2004)
- NASA Group Achievement Awards (1995, 1997)
- NASA Space Flight Medals (1994, 1996, 2000, 2005)
- De la Vaulx Medal (1994)
- Induction into the Space Technology Hall of Fame for Mediphan - DistanceDoc and MedRecorder

== See also ==
- List of Asian American astronauts
- Ed Lu
- Taylor Wang
