= Advanced Diagnostic Ultrasound in Microgravity =

The Advanced Diagnostic Ultrasound in Microgravity (ADUM) project is a U.S. government-funded study investigating strategies for applying diagnostic telemedicine to space. The Principal Investigator is Scott Dulchavsky, Chairman of Surgery at the Henry Ford Health System. This study was the first formal experiment to examine the use of ultrasound in microgravity encompassing musculoskeletal, heart, lung, abdominal, pelvic, dental, and orbital scans. Ultrasound is the only medical imaging device currently available on board the International Space Station. In addition, the lack of physician expertise on board the ISS makes diagnosis of medical conditions challenging. Ultrasound may have direct application for the evaluation and diagnosis of hundreds of medical conditions and is of interest for treating exploration crews. The telemedicine strategies investigated by this project has widespread application on Earth in emergency and rural care situations. Ultrasound images from space from a variety of body regions have been shown to be of diagnostic quality and non-expert operators were easily trained in ultrasound skills. This work has been expanded to include professional Football, Baseball, and Ice Hockey teams as well as the Winter and Summer Olympic Games in collaboration with investigators such as Marnix Van Holsbeeck. Dr. Dulchavsky has also led an innovative pilot study to expand comprehensive ultrasound education to basic science medical students at the Wayne State University School of Medicine. This trial has been shown to be a success with over 82 percent of students agreeing or strongly agreeing that their educational experience with the lightweight ultrasound technology education was positive. This technology is now being taught to medical students in their clinical clerkships.
