= Roberto Vittori =

Italian astronaut (born 1964)

Roberto Vittori OMRI
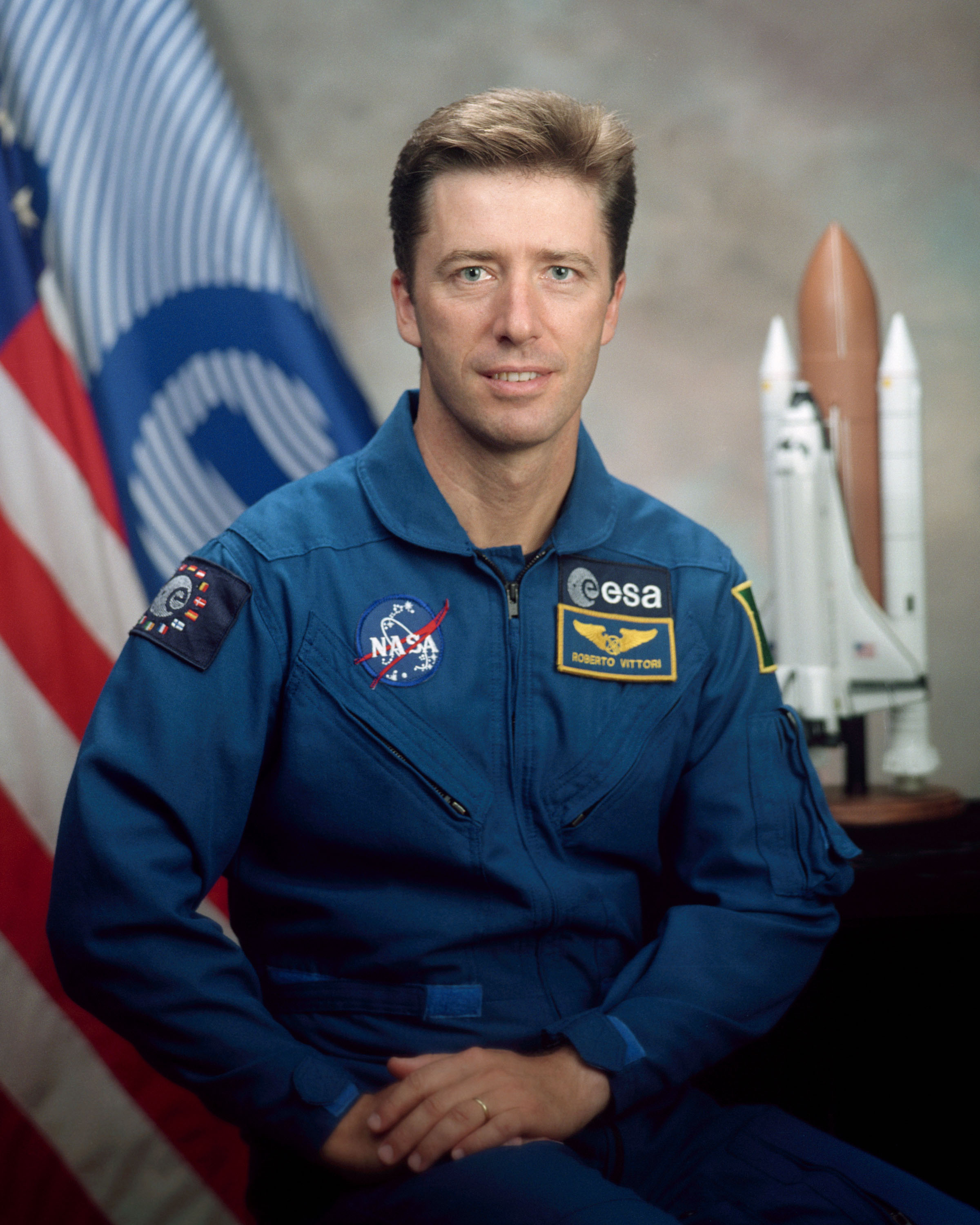
- Born: 15 October 1964 (age 61); Viterbo, Lazio, Italy
- Occupation: Test Pilot
- Space career

ASI/ESA astronaut
- Status: Retired
- Rank: Generale di Brigata Aerea (Air commodore), Aeronautica Militare (Italian Air Force)
- Time in space: 35d 12h 26m
- Selection: 1998 ESA Group, NASA Group 17 (1998)
- Missions: Soyuz TM-34/Soyuz TM-33 (ISS EP-3), Soyuz TMA-6/Soyuz TMA-5 (ISS EP-8), STS-134

Brigadier Roberto Vittori, OMRI (born 15 October 1964, in Viterbo) is an Italian Air Force officer and an ESA astronaut. After graduating from the Italian Accademia Aeronautica in 1989, Vittori flew in the Italian Air Force. He then trained as a test pilot in the United States.

In 1998, Vittori was selected by the ESA to join the European Astronaut Corps. Since then, he has participated in three spaceflights: the Soyuz TM-34/33 and Soyuz TMA-6/5 taxi flights to the ISS, as well as STS-134, the penultimate mission of the American Space Shuttle Program in 2011. He was the last non-American to fly aboard the Shuttle.

== Career ==
Vittori graduated from the Italian Air Force Academy in 1989 and trained in the United States. He flew the Tornado in the Italian Air Force before graduating in 1995 from the U.S. Naval Test Pilot School at Patuxent River, Maryland where he was the first in his class. He served at the Italian Test Center as a project pilot for the development of the new European aircraft, the EF2000. Vittori flew Tornado GR1 aircraft with the 155º Gruppo, 50° Stormo, in Piacenza, Italy from 1991 to 1994. During that time, he qualified for day/night air-to-air refuelling as well as a formation leader. He has logged over 1700 hours in over 40 different aircraft including F-104, F-18, AMX, M-2000, G-222 and P-180.

In August 1998, after selection by ESA to join the European Astronaut Corps, he reported to the Johnson Space Center in Houston, Texas. Following a period of training and evaluation, Vittori served in various technical assignments within the NASA Astronaut Office.

== Soyuz TM-34 ==
From April 25 to May 5, 2002, Vittori participated in the Soyuz TM-34 taxi-flight to the International Space Station (ISS), under an agreement between the Russian Rosaviakosmos, the Italian Space Agency (ASI), and the ESA. During his stay aboard ISS he worked alongside the resident crew overseeing four European scientific experiments. The mission successfully delivered a new "lifeboat" to the Station for use by resident crews in the event of an on-board emergency. Vittori returned to Earth aboard Soyuz TM-33.

== Soyuz TMA-6 ==
On 15 April 2005 Vittori participated in a second taxi-flight to the International Space Station (ISS), Soyuz TMA-6, returning to Earth on 24 April in the Soyuz TMA-5 capsule. He became the first European astronaut to visit the ISS twice and conducted experiments in upper limb fatigue in astronauts and germination of herbaceous plant seeds for possible space nutrition.

The astronaut also had a painting of the artist George Pusenkoff titled Single Mona Lisa (1:1) with him and took photos with it on the International Space Station. It is the ultimate continuation of the project "Mona Lisa Travels" developed by Pusenkoff and could only be realized under difficult conditions. The authorities found the idea good in theory, but constantly put forward new reasons why the project was unrealizable. Only when George Pusenkoff wrote to the then Italian ambassador in Russia, Gianfranco Facco Bonetti, the possibility of realizing the idea arose. The connection between science and art, which was also important in Leonardo da Vinci's life, found here an "actualization" in the form of this journey of an image of Mona Lisa into space. For the action, Pusenkoff's painting was removed from the frame so that it could be rolled. On April 25, 2005, Vittori took the painting back to the Earth with him.

== STS-134 ==
Vittori was a mission specialist for NASA Space Shuttle mission STS-134 in 2011. He is the last non-US astronaut to have flown on the Shuttle.

== Personal life ==
Vittori has 3 sons.

While living in Washington, DC in 2015, Vittori was nearly single-handedly responsible for the rerouting of flight paths from Reagan National Airport over DC's Ward 3 to other routes. As reported by WAMU, of the 8,760 complaints about Reagan National filed with the airports authority in 2015, 6,852 came from one household in DC's Foxhall neighborhood (Vittori's).

== Gallery ==
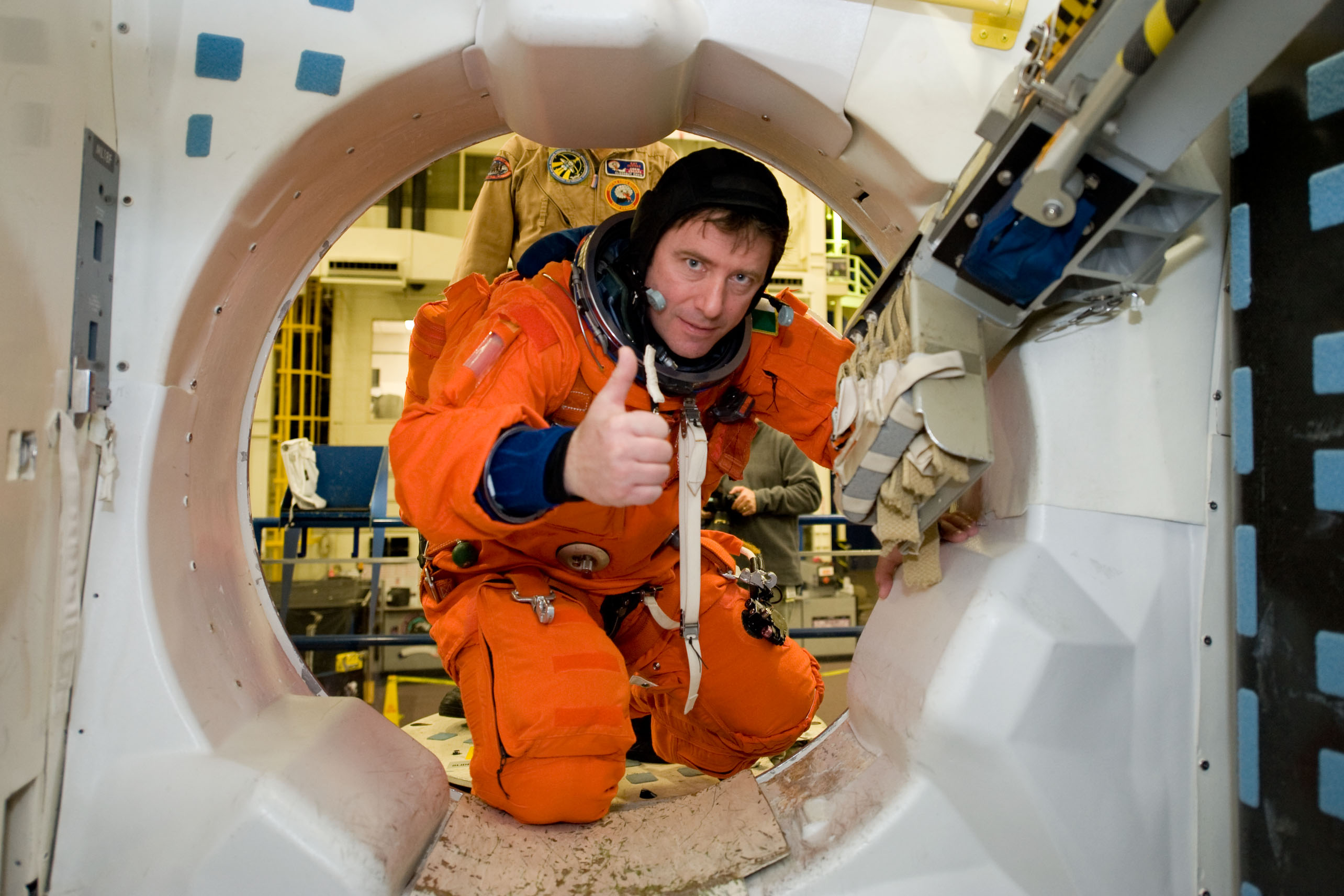
Vittori participates in training exercises for the STS-134 mission.

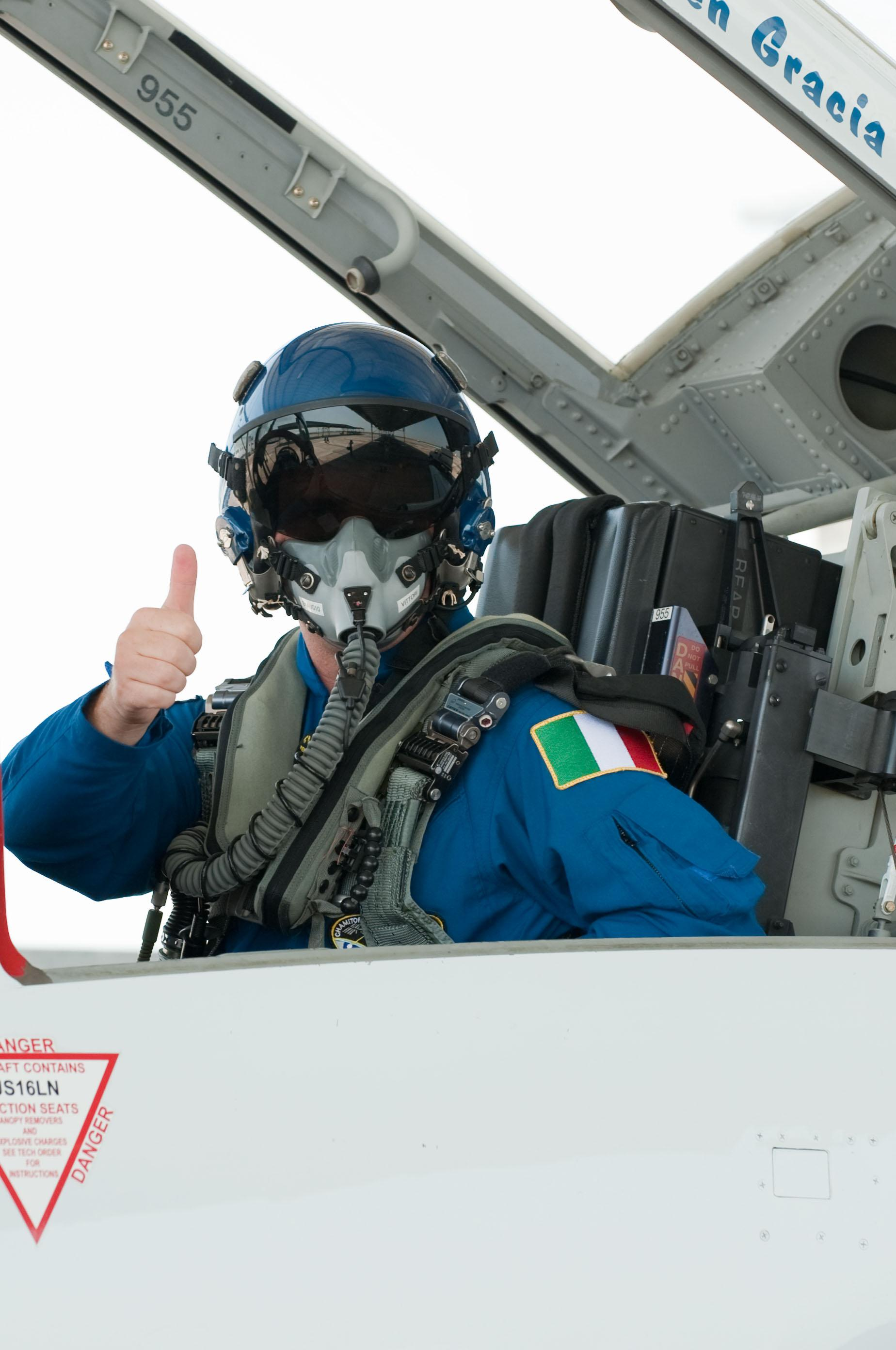
Vittori in the rear station of a NASA T-38 trainer jet.

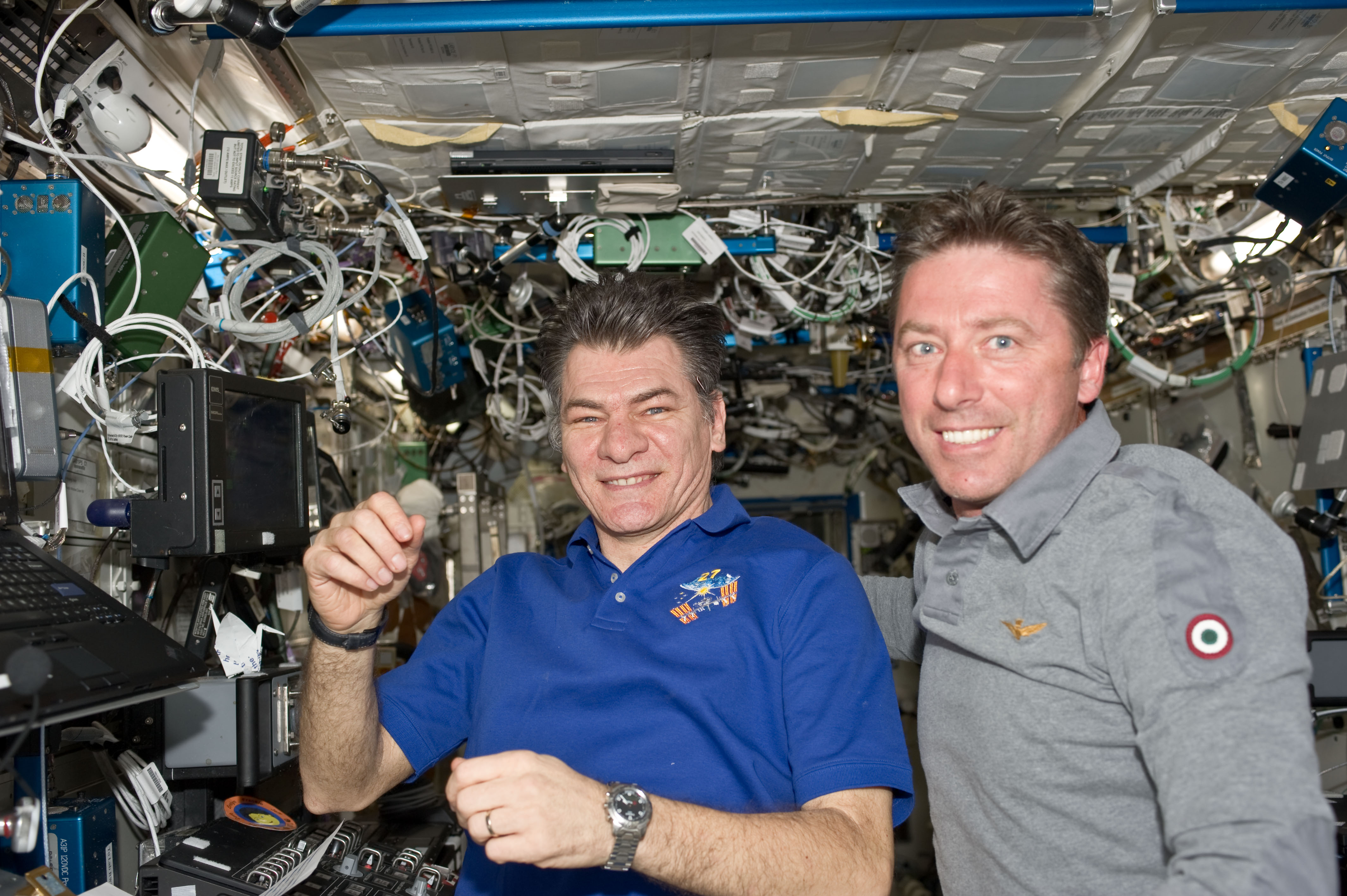
Vittori (right) with fellow ESA astronaut Paolo Nespoli aboard the ISS.
