= HTV-1 =

2009 Japanese resupply spaceflight to the ISS

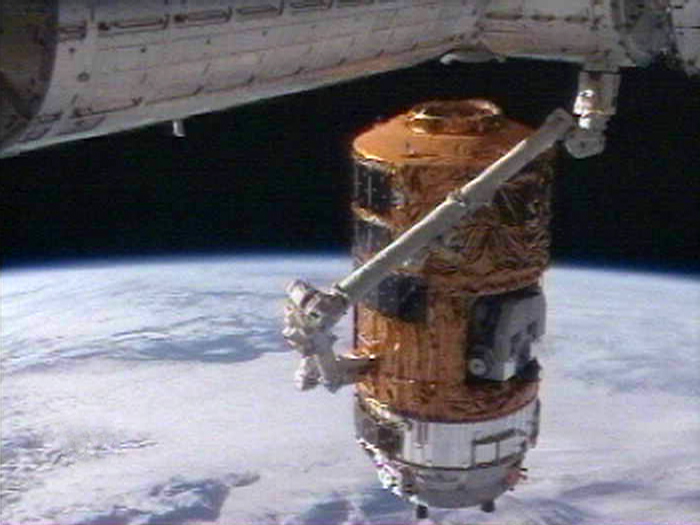
- HTV-1 before berthing
- Mission type: ISS resupply
- Operator: JAXA
- COSPAR ID: 2009-048A
- SATCAT no.: 35817
- Mission duration: 52 days

Spacecraft properties
- Spacecraft: HTV-1
- Spacecraft type: H-II Transfer Vehicle
- Manufacturer: Mitsubishi Heavy Industries
- Launch mass: 16000 kg
- Dry mass: 11500 kg (note: empty mass without cargo)

Start of mission
- Launch date: 10 September 2009, 17:01:46 UTC
- Rocket: H-IIB 304 (F1)
- Launch site: Tanegashima, Yoshinobu-2
- Contractor: Mitsubishi Heavy Industries

End of mission
- Disposal: Deorbited
- Decay date: 1 November 2009, 21:26 UTC

Orbital parameters
- Reference system: Geocentric orbit
- Regime: Low Earth orbit
- Inclination: 51.66°

Berthing at ISS
- Berthing port: Harmony
- RMS capture: 17 September 2009
- Berthing date: 17 September 2009, 22:26 UTC
- Unberthing date: 30 October 2009, 15:18 UTC
- RMS release: 30 October 2009
- Time berthed: 43 days

Cargo
- Mass: 4500 kg
- Pressurised: 3600 kg
- Unpressurised: 900 kg
- Fuel: 2432 kg
- HTV ISS Resupply

HTV-1, also known as the HTV Demonstration Flight or HTV Technical Demonstration Vehicle, was the first flight of the Japanese Space Agency (JAXA) H-II Transfer Vehicle, launched in September 2009 to resupply the International Space Station and support the JAXA Kibō module (きぼう, Kibō; lit. 'Hope') or Japanese Experiment Module (JEM). It was an uncrewed cargo spacecraft carrying a mixture of pressurised and unpressurised cargo to the International Space Station. After a 52-day successful mission, HTV departed the ISS on 31 October 2009 after being released by the station's robotic arm. The spacecraft re-entered in the atmosphere of Earth on 1 November 2009 and disintegrated on re-entry as planned.

== Payloads ==
HTV-1 carried 4,500 kilograms (9,900 lb) of payload, lower than the 6,000 kilograms (13,000 lb) maximum payload of the HTV in order to allow the spacecraft to carry additional propellant and batteries for the in-orbit verification phase of the flight.

In the Unpressurised Logistics Carrier, the HTV-1 carried SMILES (Superconducting Submillimetre-wave Limb Emission Sounder) and HREP (HICO-RAIDS Experiment Payload), which both were installed in the JEM Exposed Facility on the ISS.

The Pressurised Logistics Carrier carried 3,600 kilograms (7,900 lb) of supplies for the International Space Station. It consisted of food (33% of weight), laboratory experiment materials (20%), robot arm and other hardware for JEM (18%), crew supplies including garments, toiletries, personal mail and photographs, fluorescent lights, waste buckets (10%), and packing materials (19%).

== Launch vehicle ==
HTV-1 was launched on the maiden flight of the H-IIB launch vehicle. The H-IIB 304 configuration was used, with a type 5S-H payload fairing. Before launch, two Captive Firing Tests were conducted on the rocket which was to launch HTV-1. The first test, which consisted of firing the first stage for ten seconds, was originally scheduled to occur at 02:30 UTC on 27 March 2009, however, it was cancelled after the launch pad's coolant system failed to activate. This was later discovered to have been due to a manual supply valve not being open. The test was rescheduled for 1 April 2009, but then postponed again due to a leak in a pipe associated with the launch facility's fire suppression system. The test was rescheduled for 2 April 2009, when it was successfully conducted at 05:00 UTC.

Following this, the second test, which involved a 150-second burn of the first stage, was scheduled for 20 April 2009. This was successfully conducted at 04:00 UTC on 22 April 2009, following a two-day delay due to unfavourable weather conditions. A ground test, using a battleship mockup of the rocket was subsequently conducted on 11 July 2009.

== Operation ==
=== Launch and rendezvous with ISS ===
Approach to the ISS

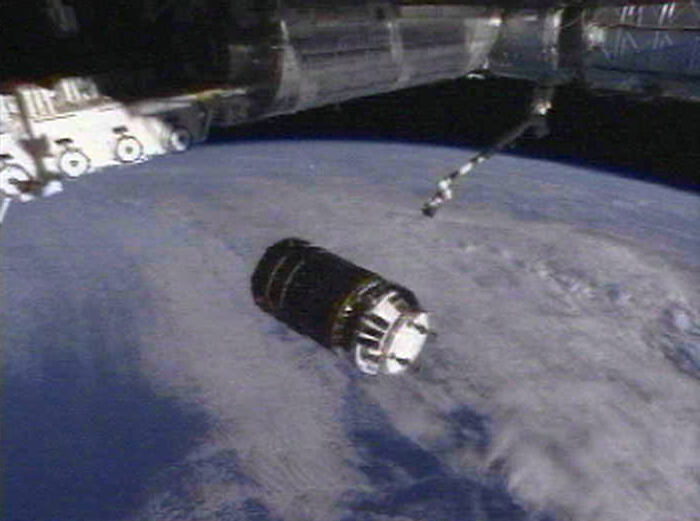
HTV-1 before capture

HTV-1 was successfully launched at 17:01:46 UTC on 10 September 2009, to the initial orbit of 199.8 kilometres (124.1 mi) of perigee, an apogee of 299.9 kilometres (186.3 mi), an inclination of 51.69° (planned 200 kilometres (120 mi) ± 10 kilometres (6.2 mi) / 300 kilometres (190 mi) ± 2 kilometres (1.2 mi) / 51.67° ± 0.15°). The launch took place from the (Yoshinobu Launch Complex (Yoshinobu-2) at the Tanegashima Space Center, and was the first to use the second pad of the complex.

Flight operations are chronicled using Flight Day (FD), the ISS crew timeline. Arrival of HTV-1 occurred during Expedition 20, (Gennady Padalka, Commander, Michael Barratt, Nicole Stott, Frank De Winne, Roman Romanenko, and Robert Thirsk). Expedition 21 supervised the departure of HTV-1, (Frank De Winne, Commander, Roman Romanenko, Robert Thirsk, Maksim Surayev, Jeffrey Williams, and Nicole Stott). The station was visited by Space flight participant Guy Laliberté. No Japanese astronaut was present during the attached phase of the HTV-1 to the ISS. The launch day is FD1 (10 September 2009). On FD3 (12 September 2009), HTV-1 performed the demonstration tests of ISS proximity operation such as collision avoidance manoeuvre. It went successfully and on FD6 (15 September 2009), ISS Mission Management Team approved the final approach.

On 17 September 2009, HTV-1 rendezvoused with the International Space Station. It arrived at the Approach Initiation Point, 5 kilometres (3.1 mi) behind the space station at 13:59 UTC, and began its final approach sequence at 15:31. It approached to within 10 metres (33 ft) of the station, from where it was grappled using the Canadarm2 robotic arm of the space station, operated by Nicole Stott. Initial capture occurred at 19:47 UTC, with the procedure being completed at 19:51. Robert Thirsk then used Canadarm2 to move it to a "ready-to-latch" position over the nadir CBM port of the Harmony module. It arrived at this position at 22:08 UTC, and by 22:12 four latches had engaged to hold it in place. Sixteen bolts were subsequently driven in to achieve a hard mate. The spacecraft's rendezvous systems are based on those tested on the ETS-VII satellite. It remained berthed at the station until 30 October 2009.

=== Departure from the ISS and re-entry ===
Expedition 21 crew members, Nicole Stott, Robert Thirsk, and Frank De Winne completed the final steps of preparing for HTV's release from the ISS. These steps included disconnecting the final remaining power jumper line, closing the Harmony module (Node-2) nadir hatch, depressurizing the vestibule and performing leak checks, removing Common Berthing Mechanism bolts and deploying latches and unberthing the HTV-1 with the Space Station Remote Manipulator System.

While passing above the Pacific Ocean, the robotic arm of the space station released the HTV-1 positioned at 12 kilometres (7.5 mi) below the station on 30 October 2009. The departure was delayed for one ISS orbit to avoid debris (Kosmos 2421). HTV-1 was loaded with 199 items of discarded equipment and waste of 727.7 kilograms (1,604 lb), as well as 896 kilograms (1,975 lb) empty racks, totaling 1,624 kilograms (3,580 lb). At 17:32 (UTC), HTV-1 was released from SSRMS and began its planned maneuvers to leave the station proximity. HTV-1 gradually departed from the ISS orbit by performing several thruster burns and entered to its solo-flight mode.

The HTV flight control team sent commands for three engine burns at 14:55, at 16:25, and at 20:53, on 1 November 2009 (UTC) to prepare the vehicle's destruction in the atmosphere of Earth. The first de-orbit engine burn lasted for approximately 8 minutes and was completed at 15:03, on 1 November 2009. The second de-orbit engine burn lasted for approximately 9 minutes and was completed at 16:34. Following the second de-orbit maneuver, the HTV-1 was inserted into an elliptic orbit with an altitude of a perigee of 143 kilometres (89 mi) and an apogee of 335 kilometres (208 mi).

HTV-1 began the third and final de-orbit maneuver at 20:53 on 1 November 2009 as planned, while the spacecraft was passing over Central Asia. The maneuver that lasted for about 8 minutes was successfully wrapped up at 21:01 as the spacecraft flew near the southern half of Japan. According to the Japan Aerospace Exploration Agency (JAXA), HTV-1's atmospheric re-entry occurred at 21:25 UTC at 120 km above and over the Pacific Ocean just off the coast of New Zealand. The fiery re-entry and disintegration in the atmosphere of Earth marked the successful completion of the HTV-1's 52-day mission.

It is believed that some of the surviving debris from the HTV would have likely fallen in a rectangular area stretching across the Pacific Ocean between New Zealand and South America, according to the Japan Aerospace Exploration Agency.

== Gallery ==
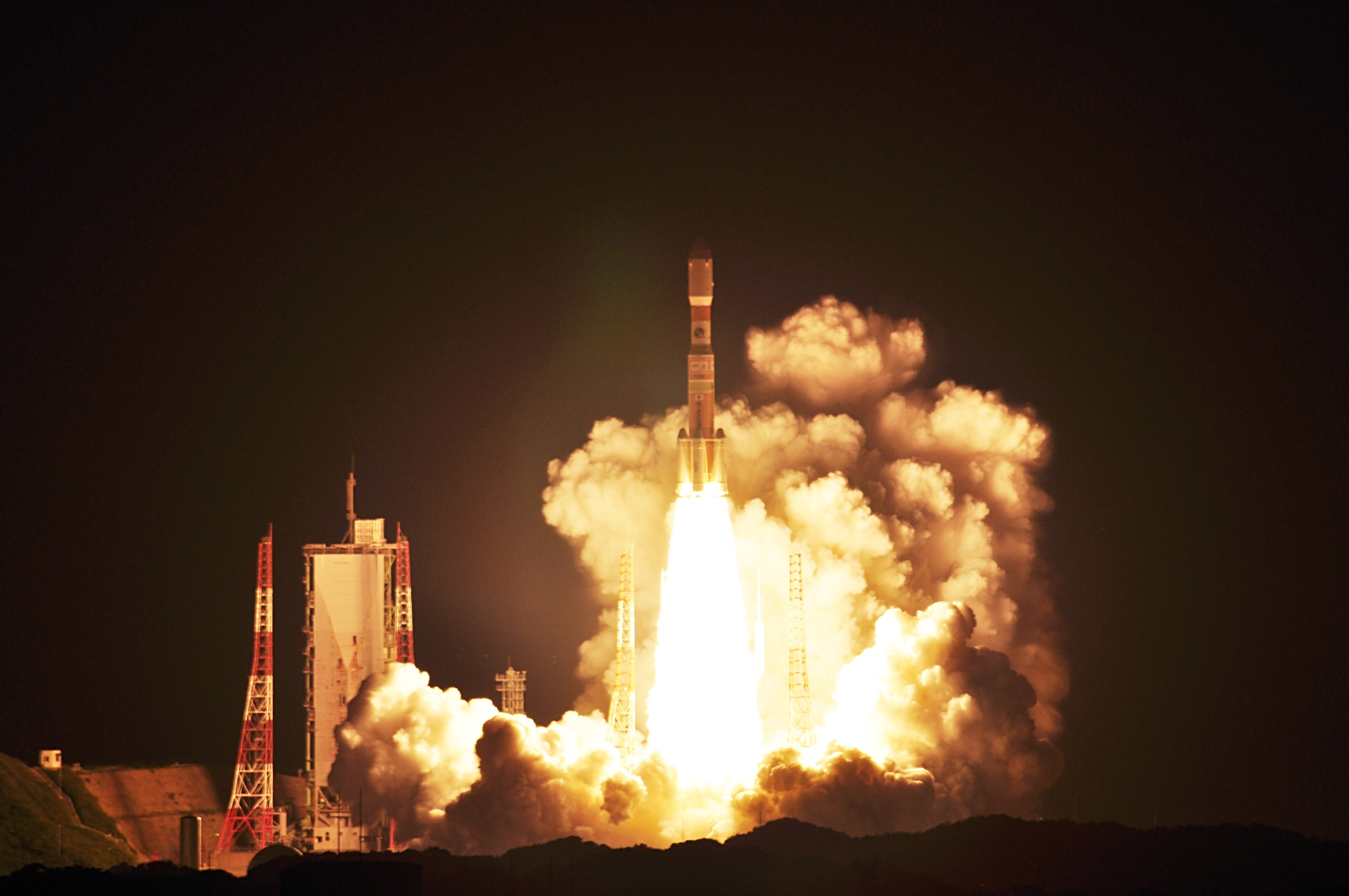
The H-IIB lifts off from the Tanegashima Space Center carrying HTV-1 in 2009.

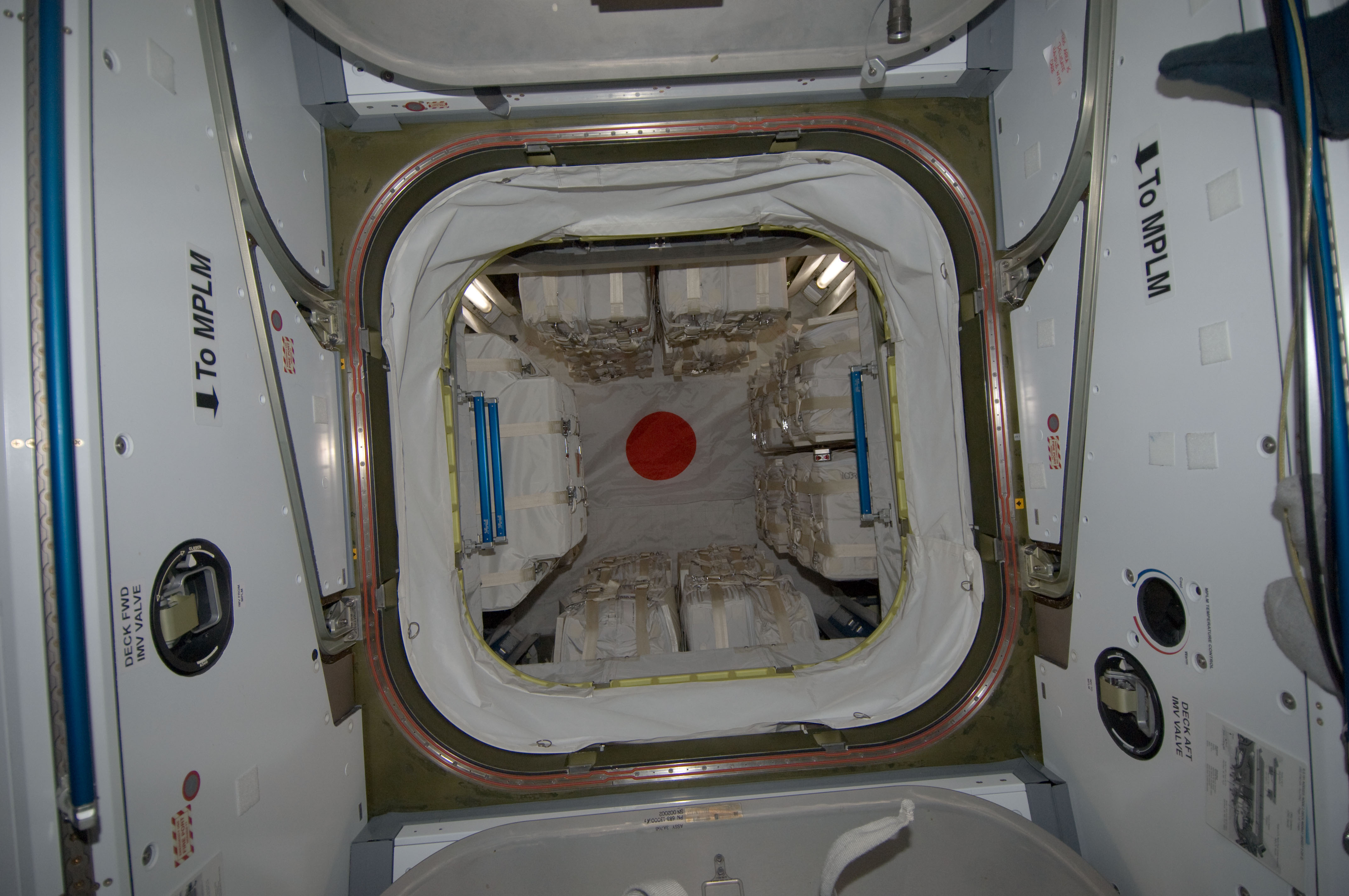
The view of HTV-1 through the Common Berthing Mechanism (CBM port). Multi-Purpose Logistics Module (MPLM) on the Harmony module refers to a cargo container that uses the same berth.

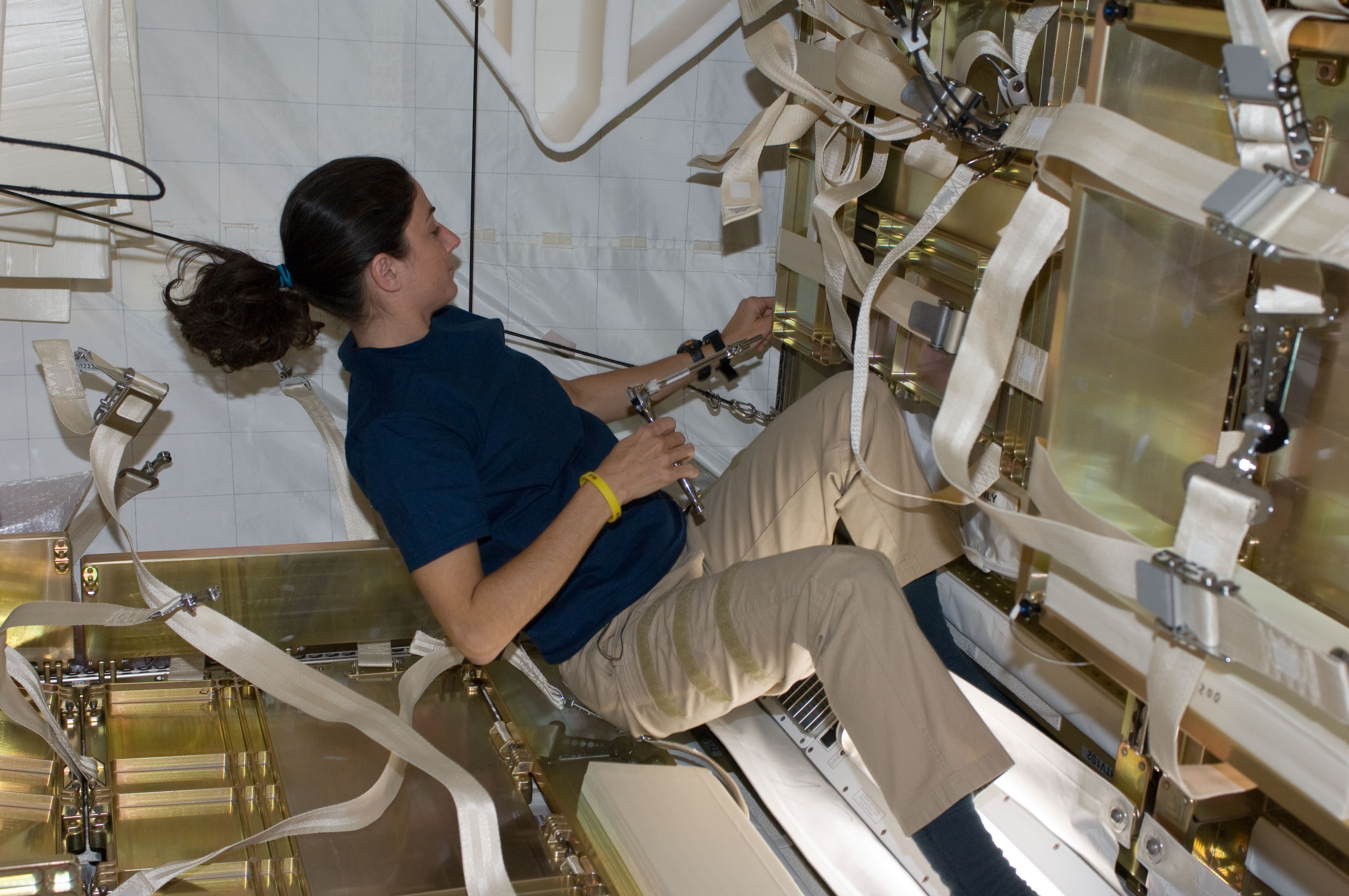
The NASA astronaut Nicole Stott working inside HTV-1, 8 days later, with some supplies already removed.

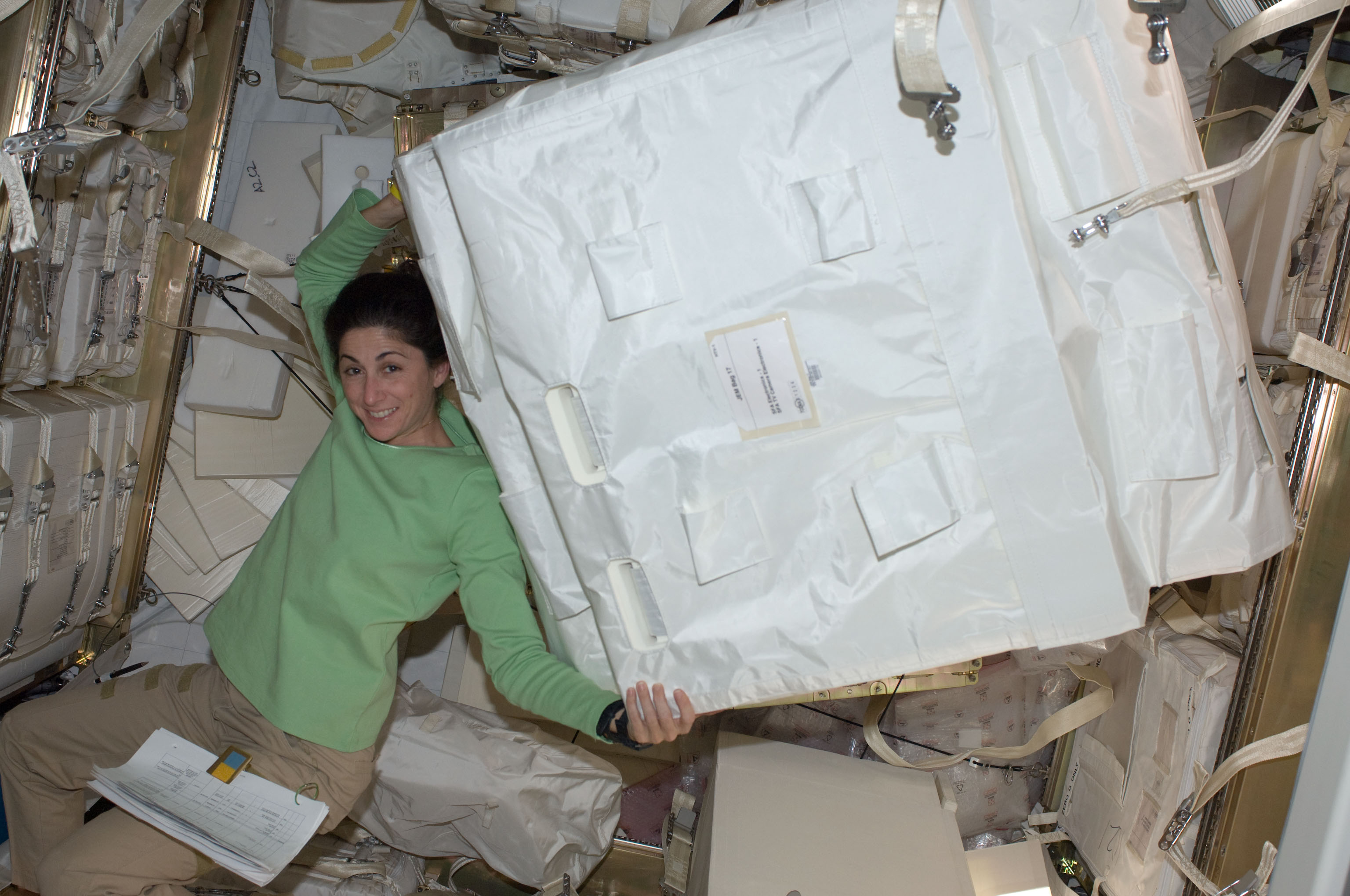
The NASA astronaut Nicole Stott moving a storage container inside HTV-1.

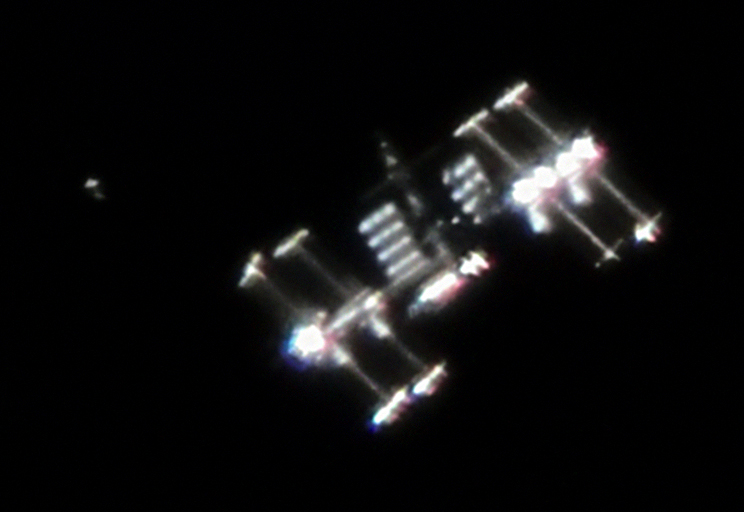
A HTV-1 demo photographed from the Netherlands by astrophotographer Ralf Vandebergh.

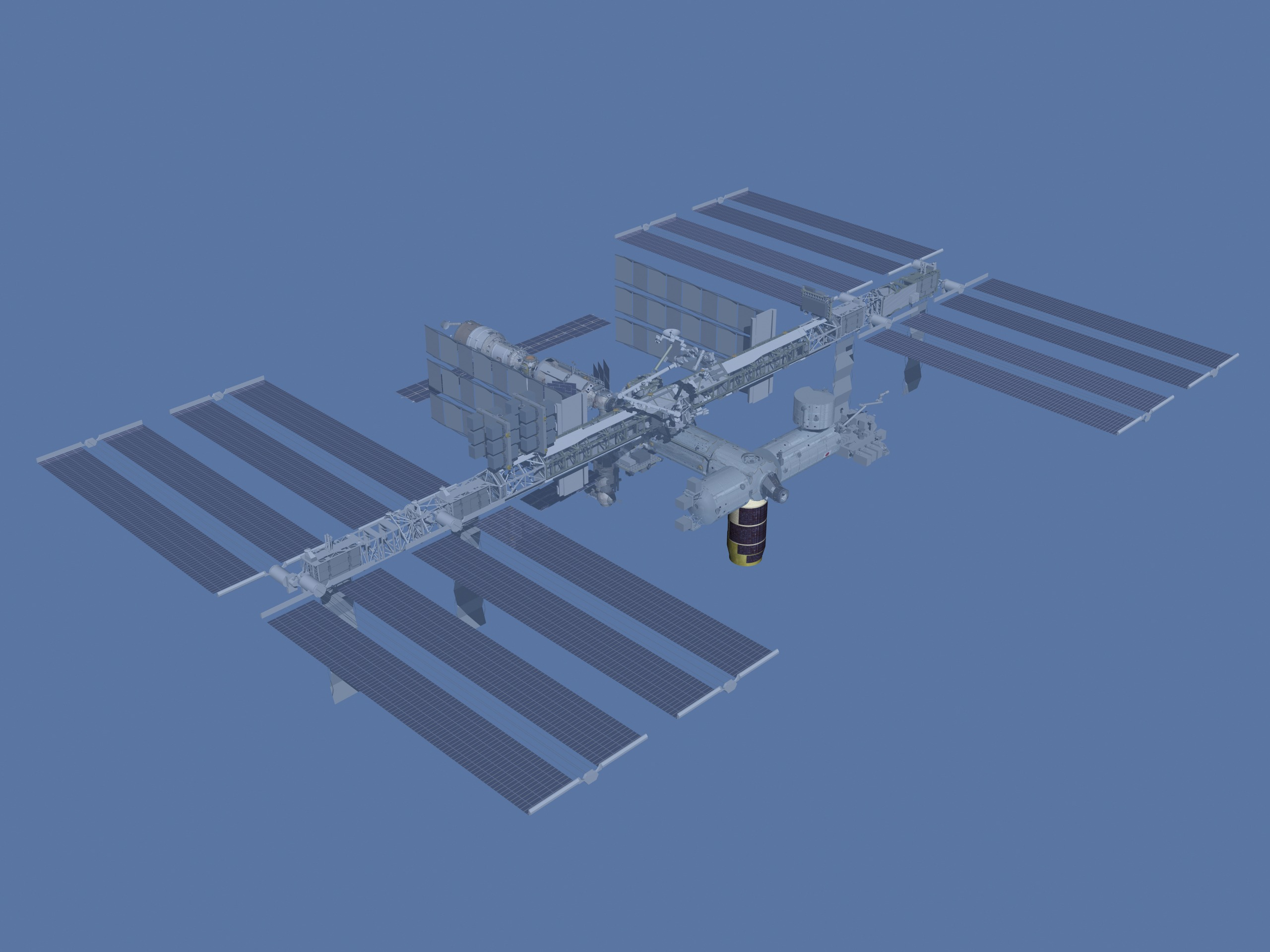
HTV-1 can be berthed on top, zenith, or bottom, nadir (shown), of Harmony.

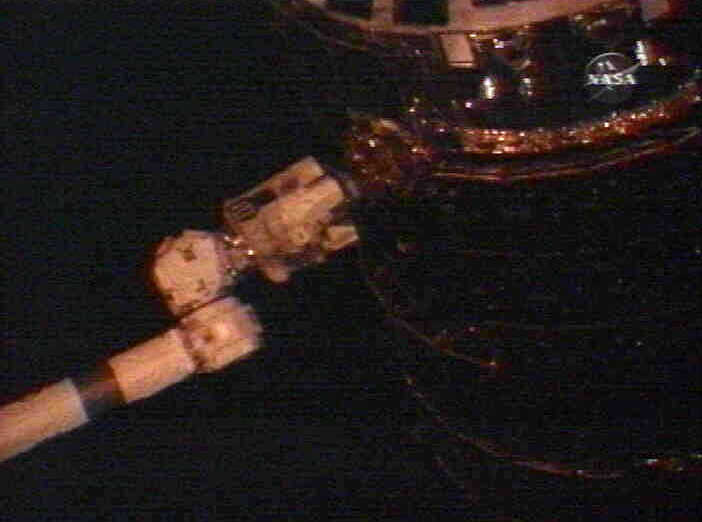
Canadarm2 captures HTV-1.

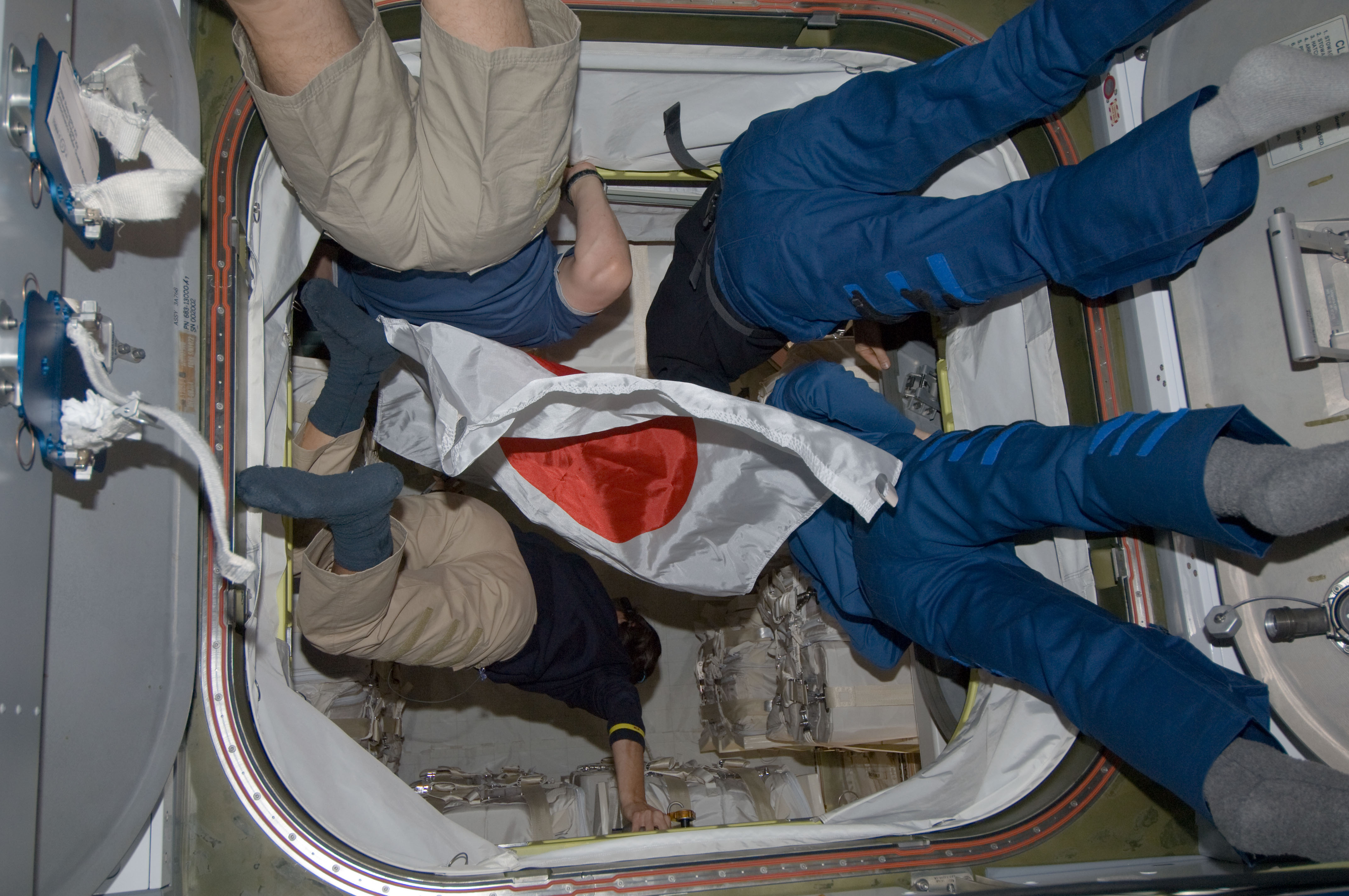
The ISS Expedition 20 crew members entering HTV-1.

== See also ==
- Automated Transfer Vehicle – Uncrewed cargo spacecraft developed by the European Space Agency
- H-II Transfer Vehicle – Uncrewed cargo spacecraft developed by JAXA
- Progress (spacecraft)
- SpaceX Dragon
- Cygnus (spacecraft) – Uncrewed cargo spacecraft developed by Orbital Sciences
- Uncrewed spaceflights to the International Space Station
