= Robert Thirsk =

Canadian engineer, astronaut and physician (born 1953)

Bob Thirsk
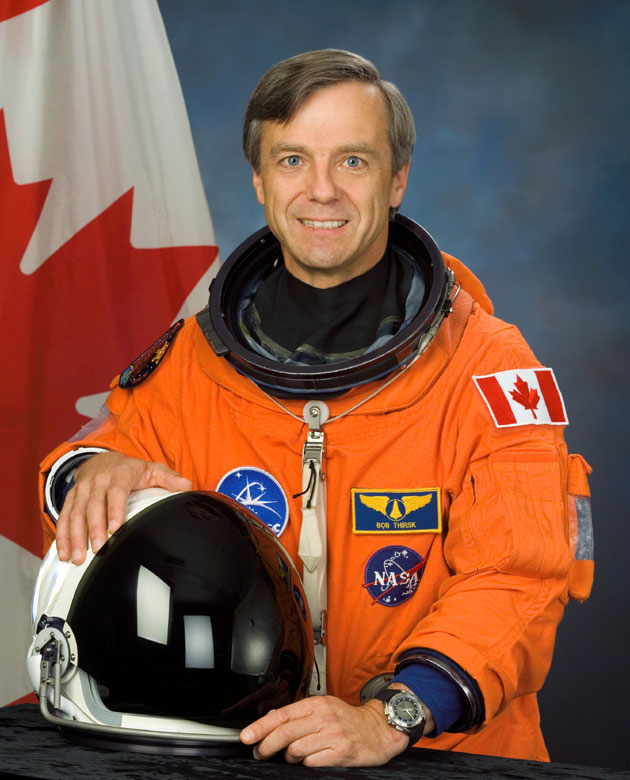
- Born: Robert Brent Thirsk; August 17, 1953 (age 73); New Westminster, British Columbia, Canada
- Education: University of Calgary (BS); Massachusetts Institute of Technology (MS, MBA); McGill University (MD); Carleton University (DEng)
- Space career

NRC/CSA astronaut
- Time in space: 204 days, 18 hours, 29 minutes
- Selection: 1983 NRC Group; NASA Group 17 (1998)
- Missions: STS-78; Soyuz TMA-15 (Expedition 20/21)
- Mission insignia

Robert "Bob" Brent Thirsk, OC OBC (born August 17, 1953) is a Canadian retired engineer and physician, and a former Canadian Space Agency astronaut. He holds the Canadian record for the most time spent in space (204 days, 18 hours and 29 minutes). He became an officer of the Order of Canada (OC) in 2013 and was named to the Order of British Columbia (OBC) in 2012.

== Life ==
Thirsk is from New Westminster, British Columbia and is married to Brenda Biasutti of Montreal, Quebec. They have three children. He enjoys spending time with his family, as well as flying, hockey, squash, and playing the piano.

He is a member of Professional Engineers Ontario, the College of Family Physicians of Canada, the Canadian Aeronautics and Space Institute, the Aerospace Medical Association, the College of Physicians and Surgeons of Ontario, and the International Space University.

He won the Association of Professional Engineers, Geologists and Geophysicists of Alberta Gold Medal in 1976, and was the first recipient of the University of Calgary Distinguished Alumni Award (1985). In 1997, he was awarded the Gold Medal of the Professional Engineers of Ontario and was awarded honorary membership in the College of Physicians and Surgeons of British Columbia.

== Education ==
Thirsk attended primary and secondary schools in British Columbia, Alberta, and Manitoba, attending Glenayre Elementary School (Port Moody, B.C.), R. T. Alderman Junior High and graduating from Calgary's Lord Beaverbrook High School. His post-secondary education began with receiving a Bachelor of Science degree in mechanical engineering from the University of Calgary in 1976, and continued with a Master of Science degree in mechanical engineering from MIT in 1978, an M.D. from McGill University in 1982, and his MBA from the MIT Sloan School of Management in 1998 as a Sloan Fellow. He received an honorary doctorate from the University of Calgary while in orbit on July 8, 2009. Fellow ISS crewmember Koichi Wakata placed the convocation cape on Thirsk, which was later removed due to it constantly floating up to his face. This event made Thirsk the first person to receive a university degree from space. In 2019, Thirsk was awarded an honorary D.Eng. from Carleton University in recognition of his outstanding career as a Canadian astronaut, his many contributions to scientific and health research, and his promotion of science education and lifelong learning.

== CSA career ==
Thirsk was in the family medicine residency program at the Queen Elizabeth Hospital in Montreal when he was selected in December 1983 by the National Research Council of Canada to join the Canadian astronaut program. He began astronaut training in February 1984 and served as backup payload specialist to Marc Garneau for space shuttle mission STS-41-G, which flew October 5 to 13, 1984. He has participated in several parabolic flight experiment campaigns on board NASA's KC-135 aircraft and has been involved in various projects relating to space medicine, the International Space Station, mission planning, and education with the Canadian Space Agency. He led an international research team investigating the effect of weightlessness on the heart and blood vessels. His team designed and tested an experimental "anti-gravity suit" that may help astronauts withstand the effects of extended spaceflight on the cardiovascular system.

He served as Chief Astronaut of the Canadian Space Agency in 1993 and 1994. In February 1994, he was crew commander for the CAPSULS mission, a simulated 7-day space mission that involved the participation of several international investigators and three other Canadian astronauts. In 1994–95, Thirsk completed a sabbatical year in Victoria, British Columbia. During this year, he improved his skills in clinical practice, space medicine research and Russian language training.

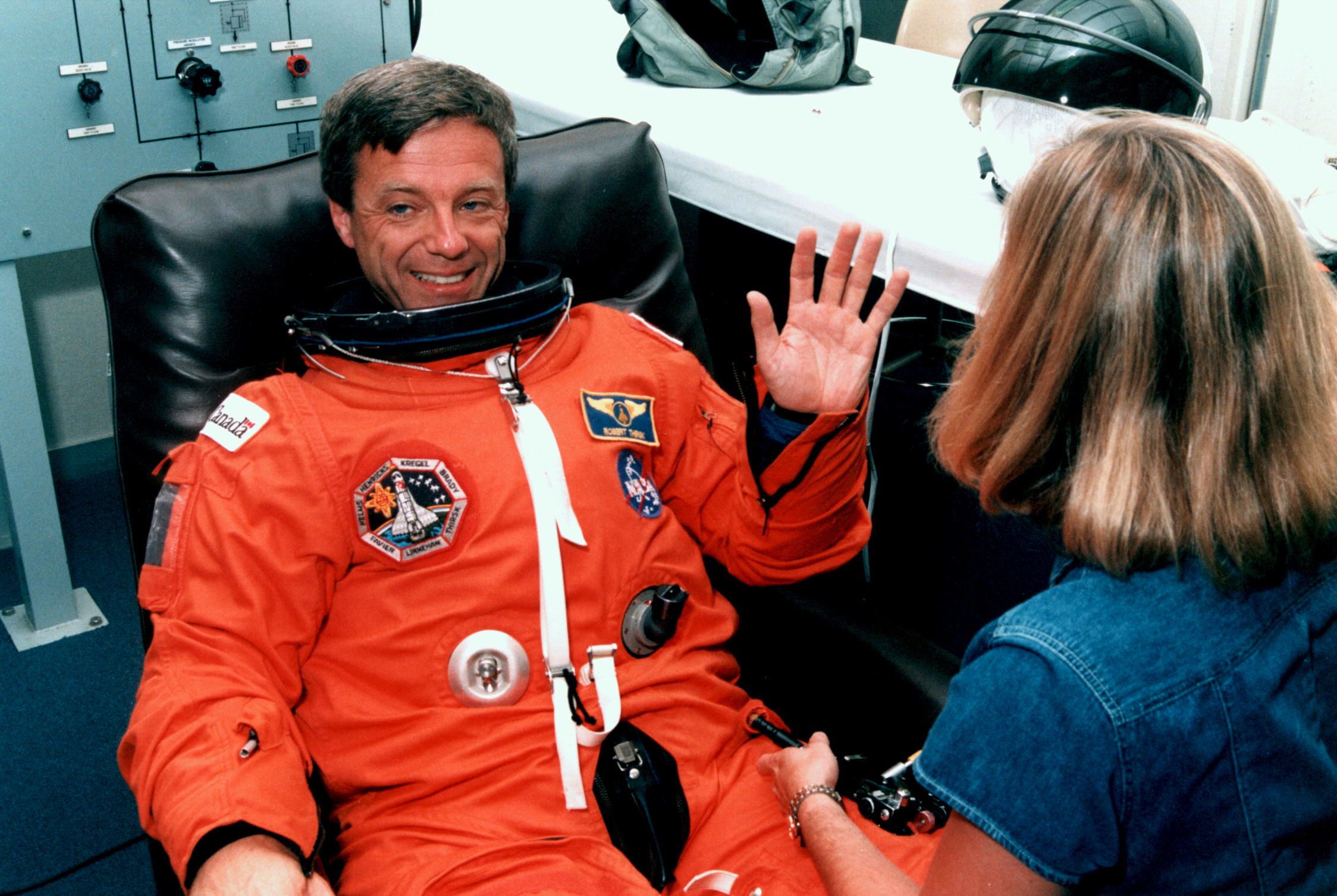
Payload Specialist Robert Thirsk suiting up for the STS-78 mission

On June 20, 1996, Thirsk flew aboard space shuttle mission STS-78 (the life and microgravity Spacelab mission) as a payload specialist. During this 17-day flight aboard the Space Shuttle Columbia, he and his six crewmates performed 43 experiments devoted to the study of life and materials science. Most of these experiments were conducted within the pressurized Spacelab laboratory module situated in the orbiter's payload bay. The life science experiments investigated changes in plants, animals and humans under spaceflight conditions. The materials science experiments examined protein crystallization, fluid dynamics, and high-temperature solidification of multi-phase materials in microgravity.

While on STS-78, Thirsk wrote two columns for the Calgary Sun newspaper. This was the first occasion in which an astronaut wrote and filed a story to a newspaper—and had it published—while the astronaut was still in orbit.

In 1998, Thirsk was assigned by the Canadian Space Agency to NASA's Johnson Space Center in Houston to pursue mission specialist training. This training program involves advanced instruction on both shuttle and space station systems, EVA (spacewalking), robotic operations, and Russian language. Within the NASA Astronaut Office, Thirsk served as a CapCom (capsule communicator) for the International Space Station (ISS) program. CapComs participate in actual and simulated space missions as a communication link between the ground team at Mission Control and the astronauts in orbit. CapComs speak directly with the space station crew, and assist with technical planning for the mission and last-minute troubleshooting.

In October 2004, Thirsk served as the commander of the NEEMO 7 mission aboard the Aquarius underwater laboratory, living and working underwater for eleven days. As a back-up crewmember, Thirsk replaced fellow CSA astronaut Dafydd Williams, who had previously served as an aquanaut on the NEEMO 1 mission, due to Williams undergoing review of a temporary medical issue. Williams eventually served as the commander of NEEMO 9 in April 2006.

In 2004, Thirsk trained at the Yuri Gagarin Cosmonaut Training Centre near Moscow and became certified as a flight engineer for the Soyuz spacecraft. He served as backup flight engineer to European Space Agency (ESA) astronaut Roberto Vittori for the Soyuz TMA-6 taxi mission to the ISS in April 2005. During the ten-day mission, Thirsk worked as Crew Interface Coordinator (European CapCom) at the Columbus Control Centre in Germany.

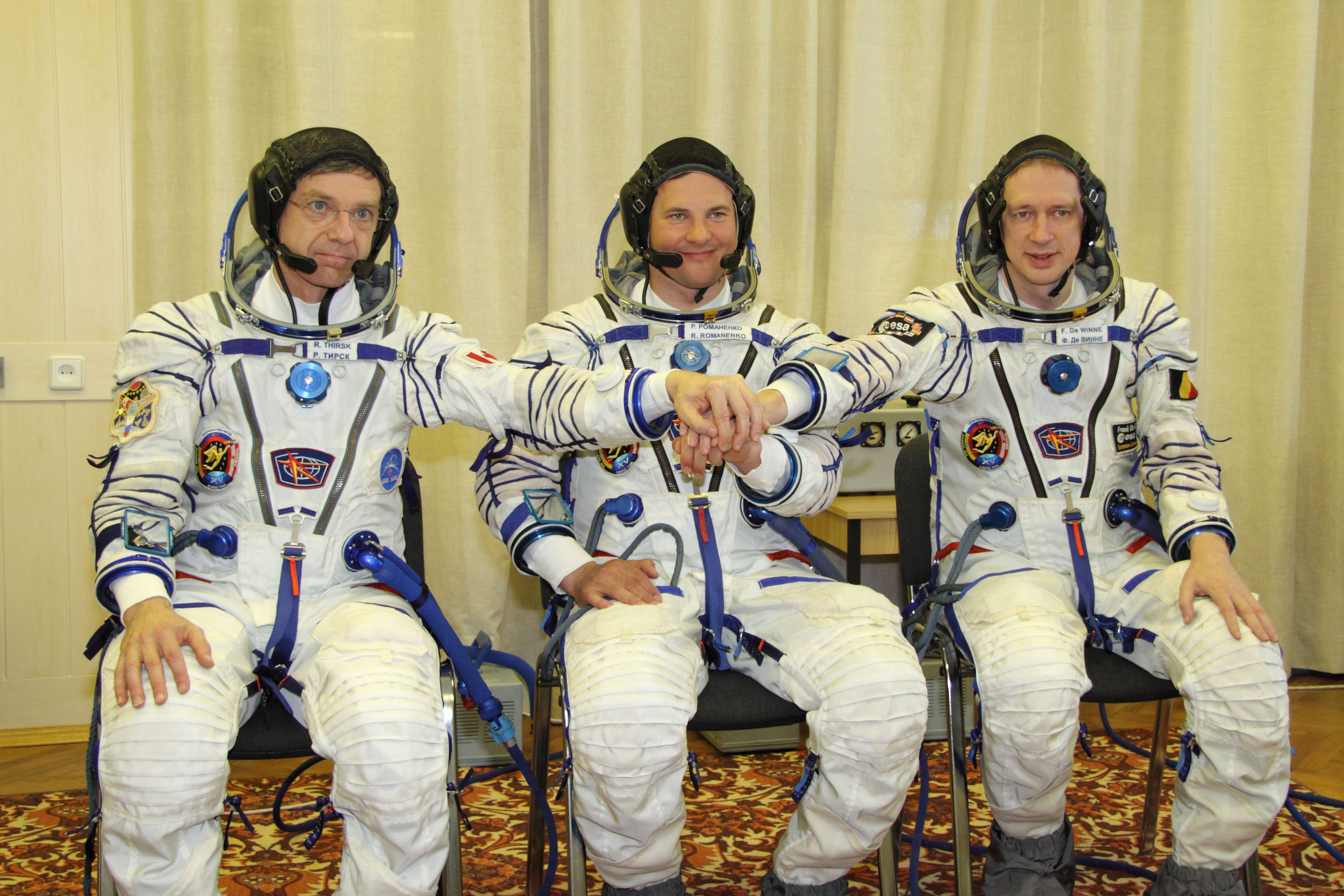
The Soyuz TMA-15 crew: Left to right: Thirsk, Roman Romanenko, Frank De Winne.

Thirsk was a member of the Expedition 21 crew on the International Space Station. He launched as a flight engineer on the Soyuz TMA-15 Soyuz mission on May 27, 2009, as a member of the Expedition 20 crew. He was the first Canadian astronaut to fly on a Soyuz. About this mission, Thirsk is quoted saying "It will be the supreme thrill of my life. Throughout the mission I will examine the long-term effects of zero gravity as both a test subject and a physician. My findings will undoubtedly contribute to the future understanding of space station living." He returned to Earth on Soyuz TMA-15 in November 2009.

During the ISS 20/21 flight, he was visited by two other Canadians: Julie Payette (Space Shuttle Endeavour STS 127) and space tourist Guy Laliberté on Soyuz TMA-16 at the end of September 2009. The meeting between Thirsk and Payette in July 2009 was the first time two Canadians met in space. He and the Soyuz TMA-15 crew returned to Earth December 1, 2009.

On April 12, 2011, Thirsk was awarded the Russian Medal "For Merit in Space Exploration" – for outstanding contribution to the development of international cooperation in crewed space flight. In 2012, he was made a Member of the Order of British Columbia and in 2013 he was made an Officer of the Order of Canada.

== Post-CSA career ==
From August 2012 to February 2014, Thirsk worked for the Canadian Institutes of Health Research as Vice President, Public, Government and Institute Affairs. The institute is the Canadian government's health research investment agency.

In September 2013, a Senior High School in Calgary, Alberta opened honoring Thirsk, named Robert Thirsk High School.

Thirsk became Chancellor of the University of Calgary on July 1, 2014.

In 2021 Robert made a trip to the UK where he gave a speech to Loughborough Grammar School.

== Awards and decorations ==

Officer of the Order of Canada	Member of the Order of British Columbia	Queen Elizabeth II; Diamond Jubilee Medal
NASA Distinguished; Public Service Medal	NASA Space Flight Medal with one star	Medal "For Merit in Space Exploration"
