= Roman Romanenko =

Russian cosmonaut (born 1971)

Roman Romanenko MP
- Роман Романенко
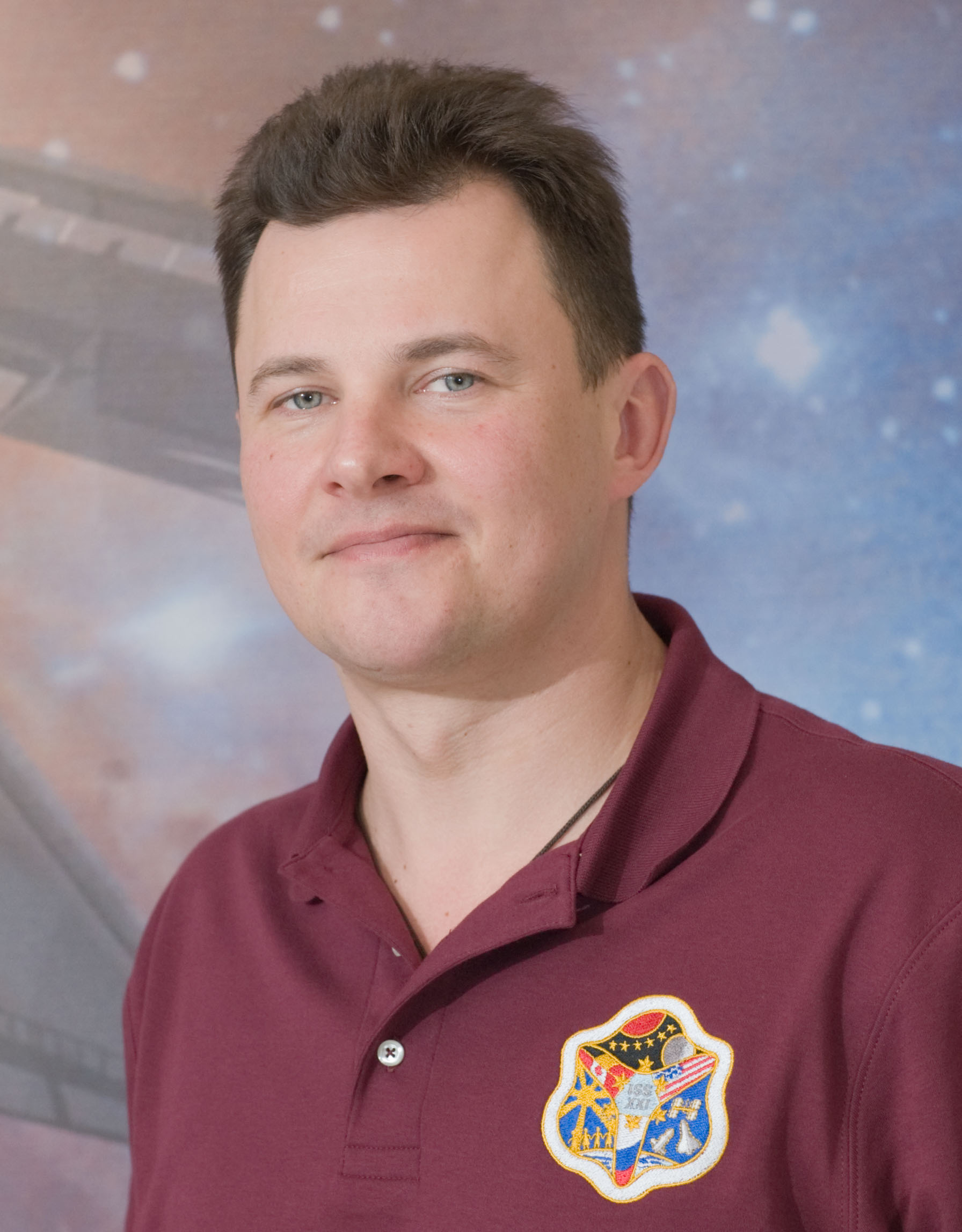

Member of the State Duma for Moscow
- Incumbent
- Assumed office 12 October 2021
- Preceded by: Anatoly Vyborny
- Constituency: Chertanovo (No. 210)

Member of the State Duma (Party List Seat)
- In office 14 October 2015 – 12 October 2021
- Preceded by: Rostislav Goldstein

Personal details
- Born: 9 August 1971 (age 55) Shchyolkovo, Moscow Oblast, Russian SFSR, Soviet Union
- Party: United Russia
- Spouse: Olga Igorevna Romanenko
- Children: Maxim; Anastasia
- Parents: Yuri Viktorovich Romanenko (father); Alevtina Ivanovna Romanenko (mother)
- Education: Chernigov Higher Military Aviation School; RANEPA
- Occupation: Pilot
- Awards: Hero of the Russian Federation
- Space career

Roscosmos cosmonaut
- Status: Retired
- Rank: Colonel
- Time in space: 333d 11h 18m
- Selection: 1997 TsPK Cosmonaut Group
- Total EVAs: 1
- Total EVA time: 6h 38m
- Missions: Soyuz TMA-15 (Expedition 20/21), Soyuz TMA-07M (Expedition 34/35)
- Mission insignia
- Retired: November 5, 2014

Roman Yurievich Romanenko (Russian: Роман Юрьевич Романенко; born 9 August 1971) is a Russian retired cosmonaut at the Yuri Gagarin Cosmonaut Training Center. He is also a politician, sitting in the State Duma since 2021 representing the Chertanovo constituency.

== Personal life ==
Romanenko was born in Shchyolkovo, near Moscow. His parents, Yuri Victorovich Romanenko and Aleftina Ivanovna Romanenko, live in Star City. He is married to Olga Igorevna Romanenko https://romanromanenko.ru/personalnaya-informaciya/. He has a son and a daughter. His hobbies include underwater hunting, tennis, car repairs, tourism, yachting, volleyball and music.

He was sanctioned by the United Kingdom from 11 March 2022 in relation to Russia's actions in Ukraine.

== Education ==
After when he graduated from Star City high school in 1986, Romanenko entered the Leningrad Suvorov military school, from which he graduated in 1988. In 1988, he entered the Chernigov High Air Force School for pilots, from which he graduated in 1992 as a pilot-engineer.

== Experience ==
Following graduation from pilot school Romanenko served as a second commander in the Air Force. He flew L-39 and Tu-134 aircraft. Romanenko has logged over 500 hours of flight time. He is a Class 3 Air Force pilot.

== Awards ==
On 6 May 2010 Romanenko was awarded the Hero of the Russian Federation medal by the decree of the Russian President Dmitry Medvedev. He was also awarded the honorary title Pilot-Cosmonaut of the Russian Federation.

== Cosmonaut career ==
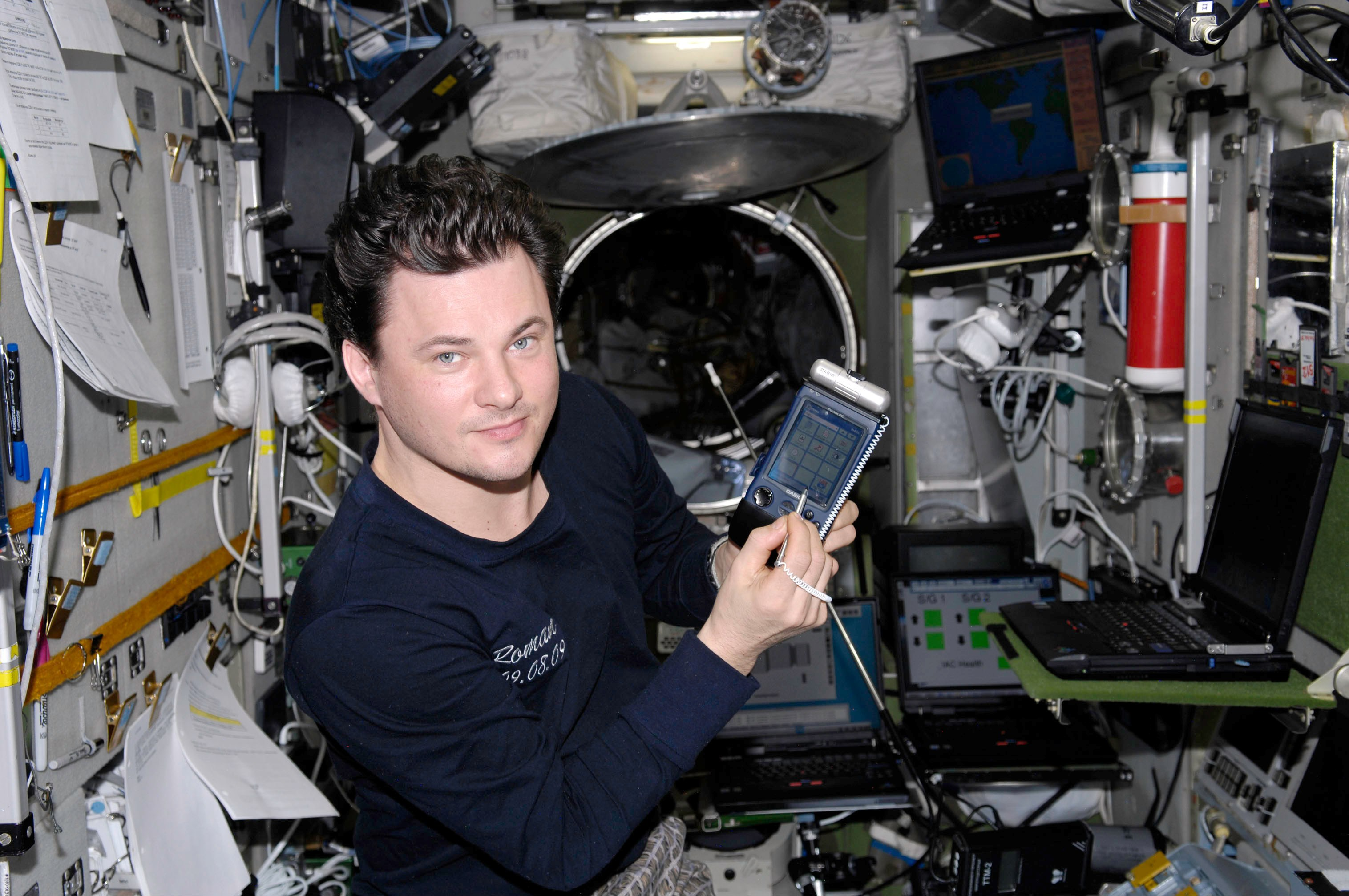
Roman Romanenko inside the Zvezda module of the ISS.

Romanenko was selected as a cosmonaut candidate at the Gagarin Cosmonaut Training Center Cosmonaut Office in December 1997. From January 1998 to November 1999 he undertook his basic training course. In November 1999 he was qualified as a Test Cosmonaut.

He served as the backup to Oleg Kotov as the Commander of Soyuz TMA-10 and Fyodor Yurchikhin as Commander of Expedition 15.

=== Expedition 20/21 ===
On 27 May 2009 Romanenko was launched into space as the commander of the Soyuz TMA-15 spacecraft from Site 1/5 at the Baikonur Cosmodrome in Kazakhstan. He was part of the Expedition 20 and Expedition 21 crews and was the third second-generation space traveller after Sergey Volkov and Richard Garriott. Romanenko served as a Flight Engineer aboard the ISS during the two long duration missions.

After spending 187 days and 20 hours in space, Romanenko returned to Earth along with astronauts, Robert Thirsk and Frank de Winne on 1 December 2009.

=== Expedition 34/35 ===
On 19 December 2012, Romanenko was launched to space on Soyuz TMA-07M along with Chris Hadfield and Thomas Marshburn. He was a part of the crews of Expedition 34 and Expedition 35 aboard the ISS. He served as a Flight Engineer.

Romanenko returned to Earth on 14 May 2013 spending 145 days and 14 hours in space.

=== First Spacewalk ===
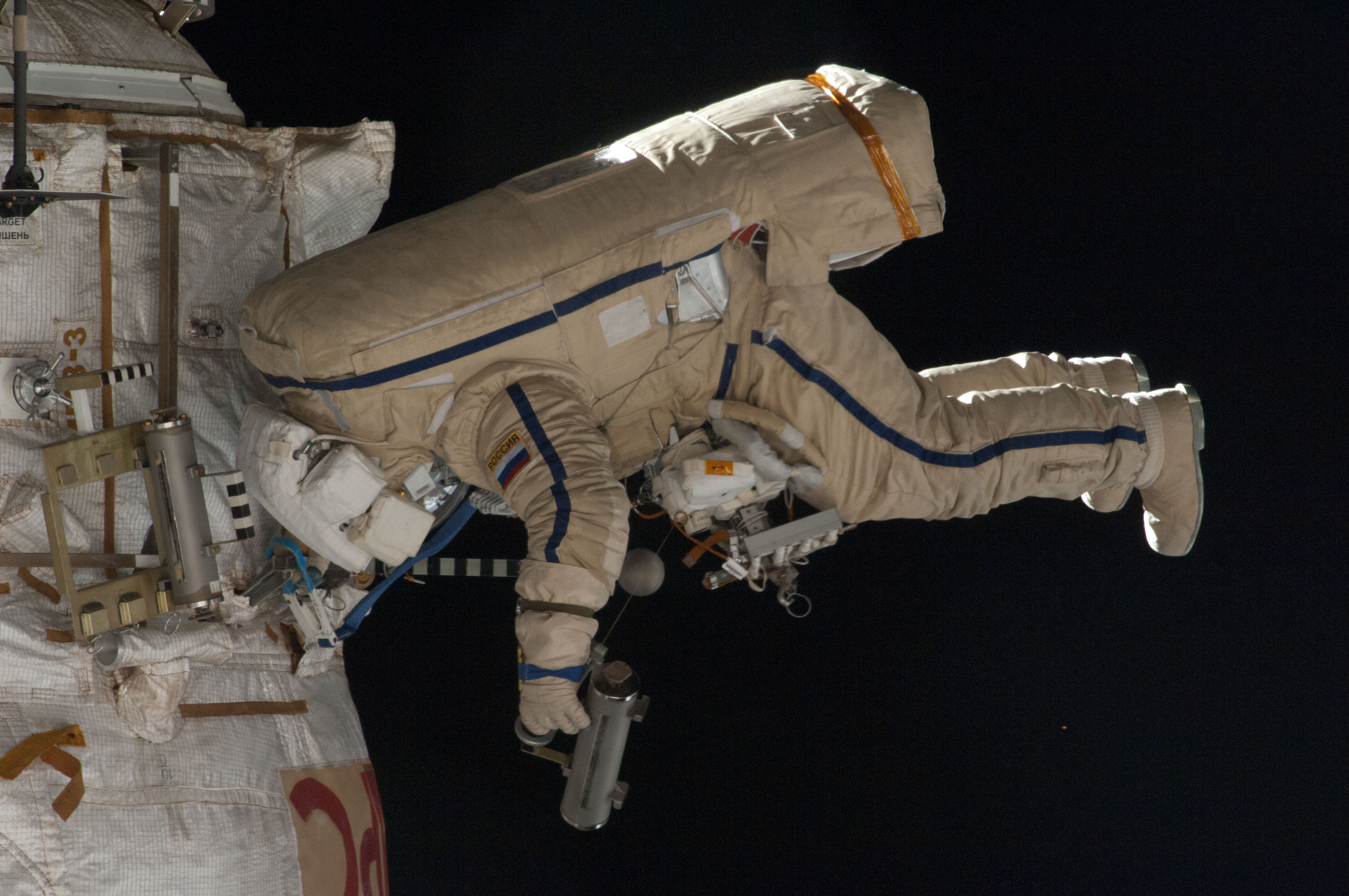
Romanenko during the first spacewalk of the Expedition 35 mission on April 19, 2013.

On 19 April 2013 Romanenko completed his first spacewalk with fellow cosmonaut Pavel Vinogradov, a 6-hour 38 minute EVA to conduct repairs to the ISS.

== See also ==
- List of Heroes of the Russian Federation
