= Soyuz TMA-15 =

2009 Russian crewed spaceflight to the ISS

- Mission type: ISS crew rotation
- Operator: Roscosmos
- COSPAR ID: 2009-030A
- SATCAT no.: 35010
- Mission duration: 187 days, 20 hours and 42 minutes

Spacecraft properties
- Spacecraft type: Soyuz-TMA 11F732
- Manufacturer: Energia

Crew
- Crew size: 3
- Members: Roman Romanenko; Frank De Winne; Robert Brent Thirsk
- Callsign: Таймыр (Taymyr) or Парус (Parus, meaning Sail)

Start of mission
- Launch date: 27 May 2009, 10:34:53 UTC
- Rocket: Soyuz-FG
- Launch site: Baikonur 1/5

End of mission
- Landing date: 1 December 2009, 07:17 UTC

Orbital parameters
- Reference system: Geocentric
- Regime: Low Earth
- Perigee altitude: 151 kilometres (94 mi)
- Apogee altitude: 414 kilometres (257 mi)
- Inclination: 51.6 degrees
- Period: 90.16 minutes
- Epoch: 28 May 2009

Docking with ISS
- Docking port: Zarya nadir
- Docking date: 29 May 2009; 12:34 UTC
- Undocking date: 1 December 2009; 03:56 UTC
- Time docked: 185d 15h 22m
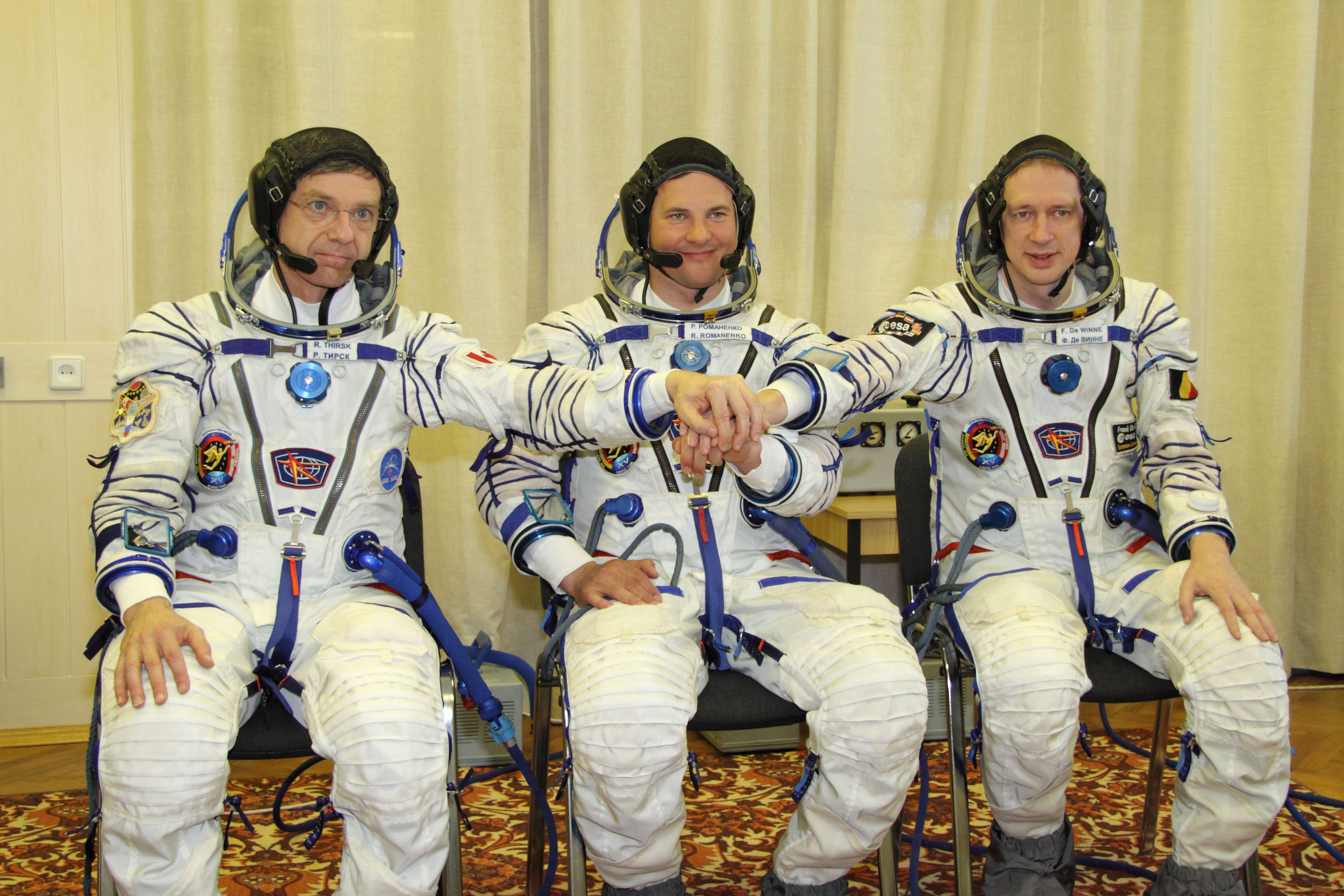
- From left to right; Thirsk, Romanenko and De Winne Soyuz programme (Crewed missions)

Soyuz TMA-15 was a crewed spaceflight to the International Space Station. Part of the Soyuz programme, it transported three members of the Expedition 20 crew to the space station. TMA-15 was the 102nd crewed flight of a Soyuz spacecraft, since Soyuz 1 in 1967. The Soyuz spacecraft remained docked to the space station during Expedition 20 and Expedition 21 as an emergency escape vehicle. The mission marked the start of six-person crew operations on the ISS. The European segment of the mission was called "OasISS".

== Crew ==
Position	Crew Member
Commander	(Russia) Roman Romanenko; Expedition 20; First spaceflight
Flight Engineer 1	(Belgium) Frank De Winne, ESA; Expedition 20; Second and last spaceflight
Flight Engineer 2	(Canada) Robert Thirsk, CSA; Expedition 20; Second and last spaceflight

=== Backup crew ===
Position	Cosmonaut
Commander	(Russia) Dmitrij Kondratiyev
Flight Engineer 1	(Netherlands) André Kuipers, ESA
Flight Engineer 2	(Canada) Chris Hadfield, CSA

== Mission highlights ==
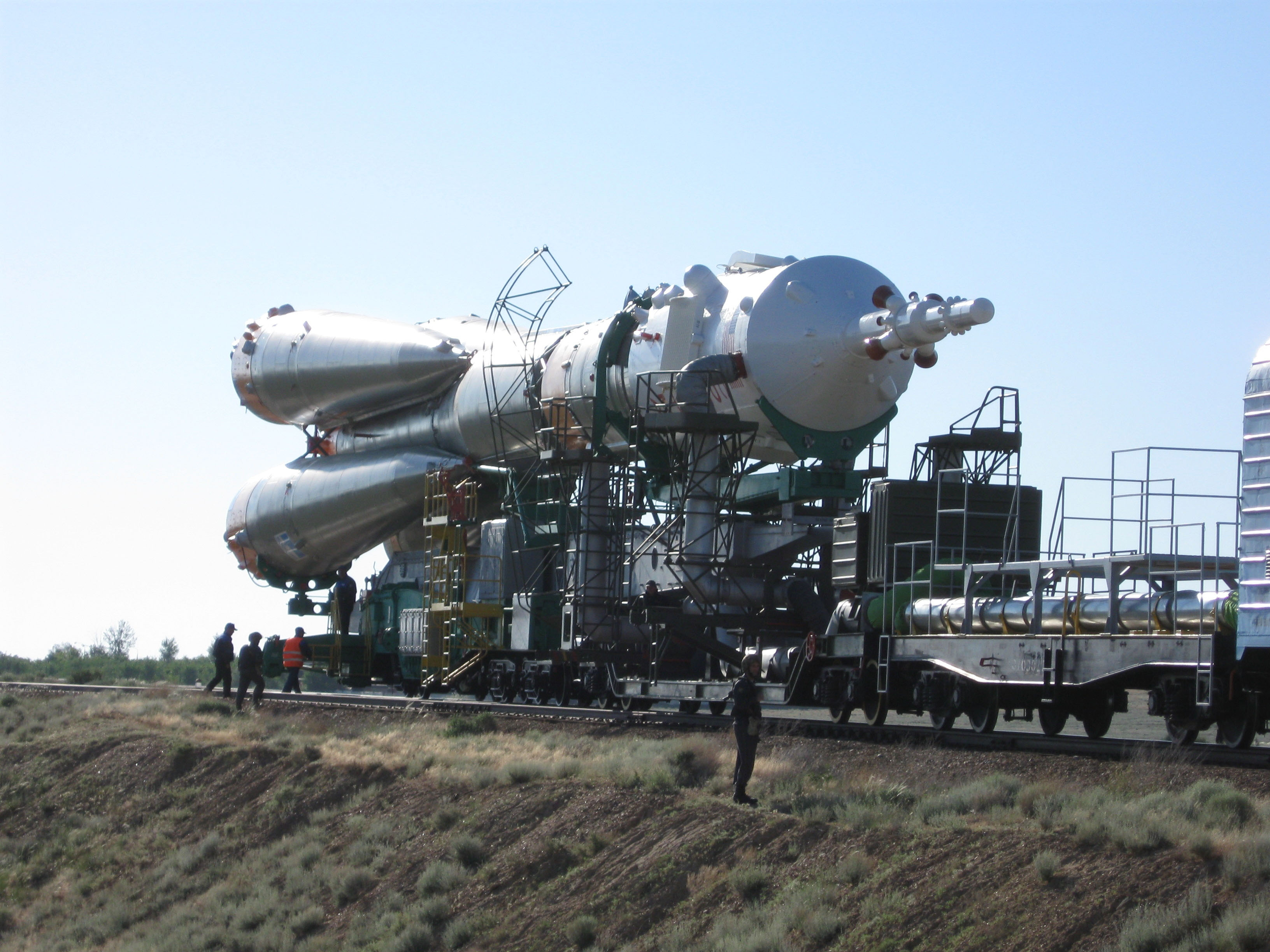
The rollout of Soyuz TMA-15 on 25 May, with an American flag painted on the capsule

Soyuz TMA-15 was launched successfully by a Soyuz-FG carrier rocket from Site 1/5 at the Baikonur Cosmodrome in Kazakhstan, at 10:34 UTC on 27 May 2009. It docked with the ISS at 12:34 UTC on 29 May 2009.

Roman Romanenko was the third second-generation space traveller. He was reported to have chosen Taymyr (Russian: Таймыр) as the mission callsign because it was the callsign on his father's first flight, Soyuz 26; however, the callsign Parus (Russian: Парус meaning Sail) was used for communications with the spacecraft. Robert Thirsk became the first Canadian to fly on a Soyuz; all previous Canadians in space had flown aboard Space Shuttles. Frank De Winne became the first European to be in command of the ISS.

The craft and crew returned to earth 1 December 2009.
