= Joe Bill Dryden Semper Viper Award =

The Joe Bill Dryden Semper Viper Award is an award granted by Lockheed Martin to a pilot that has demonstrated exceptional abilities.

Joe Bill Dryden was a famous pilot in the United States Air Force and a test-pilot for General Dynamics. He crashed during an F-16 Fighting Falcon test flight.

Belgian Astronaut Frank de Winne was the first non-American pilot to receive this award in 1997. He managed to land his F-16 safely despite a failure his engine and main flight instruments. He opted not to use his ejection seat because there was a strong chance that his aircraft would crash in the densely populated surroundings of Leeuwarden.
