= Expedition 20 =

Long-duration mission to the International Space Station

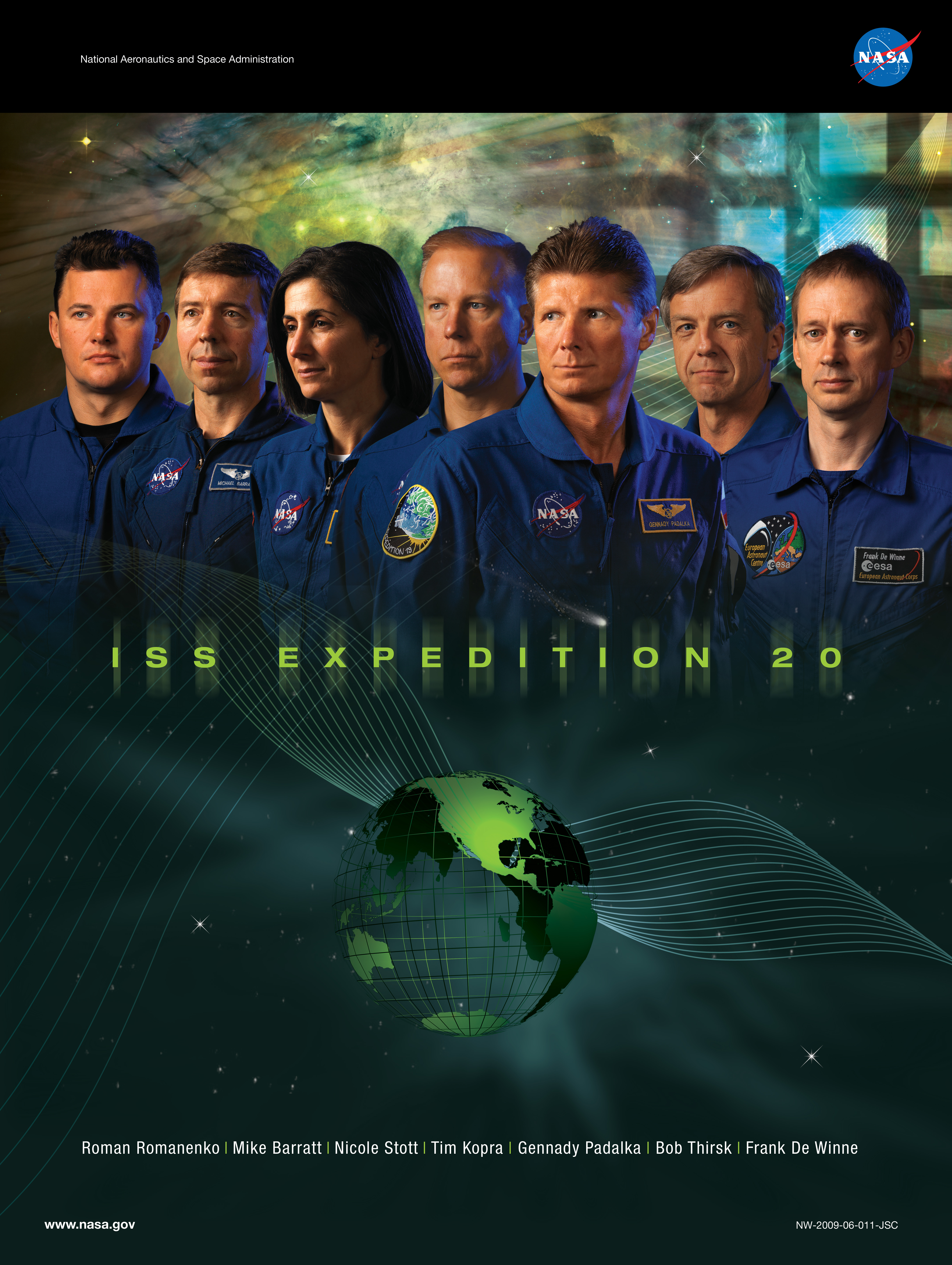
- Promotional Poster
- Mission type: Long-duration expedition
- Mission duration: 5 months

Expedition
- Space station: International Space Station
- Began: 29 May 2009, 12:34 UTC
- Ended: 11 October 2009
- Arrived aboard: Exp 19/20: Soyuz TMA-14; Exp 20/21: Soyuz TMA-15; Wakata: STS-119; Space Shuttle Discovery; Kopra: STS-127; Space Shuttle Endeavour; Stott: STS-128; Space Shuttle Discovery
- Departed aboard: Exp 19/20: Soyuz TMA-14; Exp 20/21: Soyuz TMA-15; Wakata: STS-127; Space Shuttle Endeavour; Kopra: STS-128; Space Shuttle Discovery; Stott: STS-129; Space Shuttle Atlantis

Crew
- Crew size: 8
- Members: Gennady Padalka*; Michael Barratt*; Koichi Wakata* (May–July); Timothy Kopra (July–August); Nicole Stott† (August–October); Frank De Winne†; Roman Romanenko†; Robert Thirsk† * – transferred from Expedition 19 † – transferred to Expedition 21
- EVAs: 2
- EVA duration: 5 hours, 6 minutes
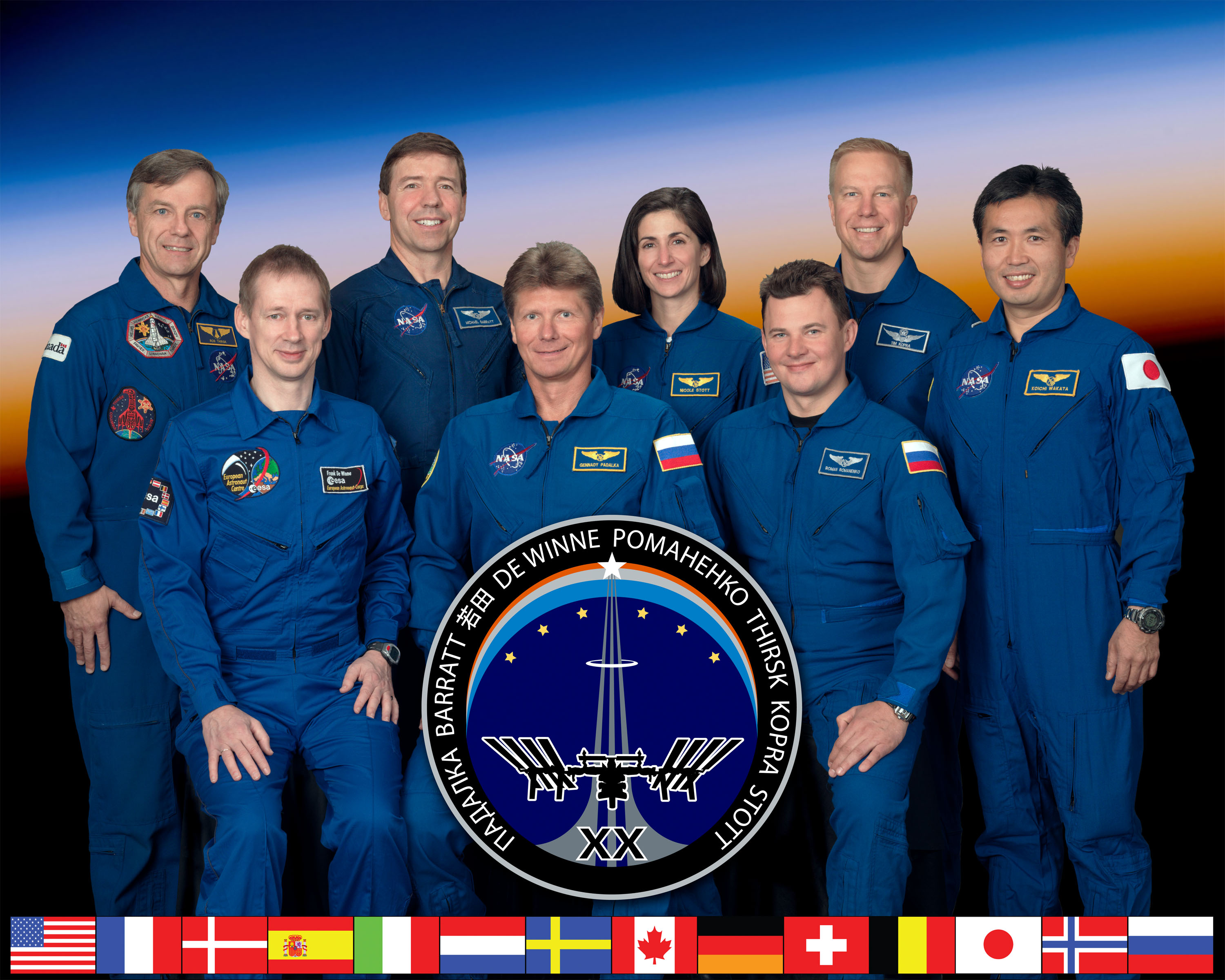
- Expedition 20 mission patch Front Row: Frank De Winne, Gennady Padalka, Roman Romanenko; Back Row: Robert Thirsk, Michael Barratt, Nicole Stott, Timothy Kopra, Koichi Wakata ISS expeditions

Expedition 20 was the 20th long-duration flight to the International Space Station. The expedition marked the first time a six-member crew inhabited the station. Because each Soyuz-TMA spacecraft could hold only three people, two separate launches were necessary: Soyuz TMA-14 launched on 26 March 2009, and Soyuz TMA-15 followed on 27 May 2009.

Soyuz TMA-15 launched from Baikonur Cosmodrome at 10:34 UTC on 27 May 2009. The vehicle docked with the station on 29 May 2009, officially changing the Soyuz TMA-14 crew from Expedition 19 to Expedition 20.

Gennady Padalka was the first commander of a six-member station crew, and the first commander of two consecutive expeditions (Expedition 19 and 20). Nicole Stott was the final expedition astronaut to be launched on the shuttle.

During the expedition, Koichi Wakata performed a special experiment wherein he did not change his underpants for one month, in order to test a specially designed underwear without washing or changing; he reportedly did not develop body odor due to the effects of the special garment.

The station would not be permanently occupied by six crew members all year. For example, when the Expedition 20 crew (Roman Romanenko, Frank De Winne and Bob Thirsk) returned to Earth in November 2009, for a period of about two weeks only two crew members (Jeff Williams and Max Surayev) were aboard. This increased to five in early December, when Oleg Kotov, Timothy Creamer and Soichi Noguchi arrived on Soyuz TMA-17. It decreased to three when Williams and Surayev departed in March 2010, and finally returned to six in April 2010 with the arrival of Soyuz TMA-18, carrying Aleksandr Skvortsov, Mikhail Korniyenko and Tracy Caldwell Dyson.

== Crew ==
Position	First Part (May to July 2009)	Second Part (July to August 2009)	Third Part (August to October 2009)
Commander	Gennady Padalka, RSA; Third spaceflight		
Flight Engineer 1	Michael Barratt, NASA; First spaceflight		
Flight Engineer 2	Frank De Winne, ESA; Second and last spaceflight		
Flight Engineer 3	Roman Romanenko, RSA; First spaceflight		
Flight Engineer 4	Robert Thirsk, CSA; Second and last spaceflight		
Flight Engineer 5	Koichi Wakata, JAXA; Third spaceflight	Timothy Kopra, NASA; First spaceflight	Nicole Stott, NASA; First spaceflight

== Backup crew ==
- Maksim Surayev, Commander
- Jeff Williams
- Timothy Creamer
- Catherine Coleman
- André Kuipers
- Dimitri Kondratyev
- Chris Hadfield

== Extra-vehicular activity ==
Mission	Spacewalkers	Start (UTC)	End (UTC)	Duration
Expedition 20; EVA 1 ‡	Gennady Padalka; Michael R. Barratt	5 June 2009; 7:52	5 June 2009; 12:46	4 hours, 54 minutes
Expedition 20; EVA 1 ‡	Prepared the Zvezda service module transfer compartment for the arrival of the Poisk module, installed docking antenna for the module, photographed antenna for evaluation on the ground, and photographed the Strela-2 crane.			
Expedition 20; EVA 2	Gennady Padalka; Michael R. Barratt	10 June 2009; 6:55	10 June 2009; 7:07	12 minutes
Expedition 20; EVA 2	Internal spacewalk in the depressurised Zvezda transfer compartment, to replace one of the Zvezda hatches with a docking cone, in preparation for the docking of the Poisk module later in 2009. Poisk docked automatically to the zenith port of Zvezda on 12 November 2009, and serves as an additional docking port for Russian vehicles.			

‡ denotes spacewalks performed from the Pirs docking compartment in Russian Orlan suits.

On 3 July 2009 expedition members undocked the Soyuz TMA-14 craft from the aft port of the Zvezda service module and piloted it over to the Pirs docking compartment. This was done to clear the way for the arrival of a Progress supply craft.

The Expedition 20 crew lands in Arkalyk, Kazakhstan

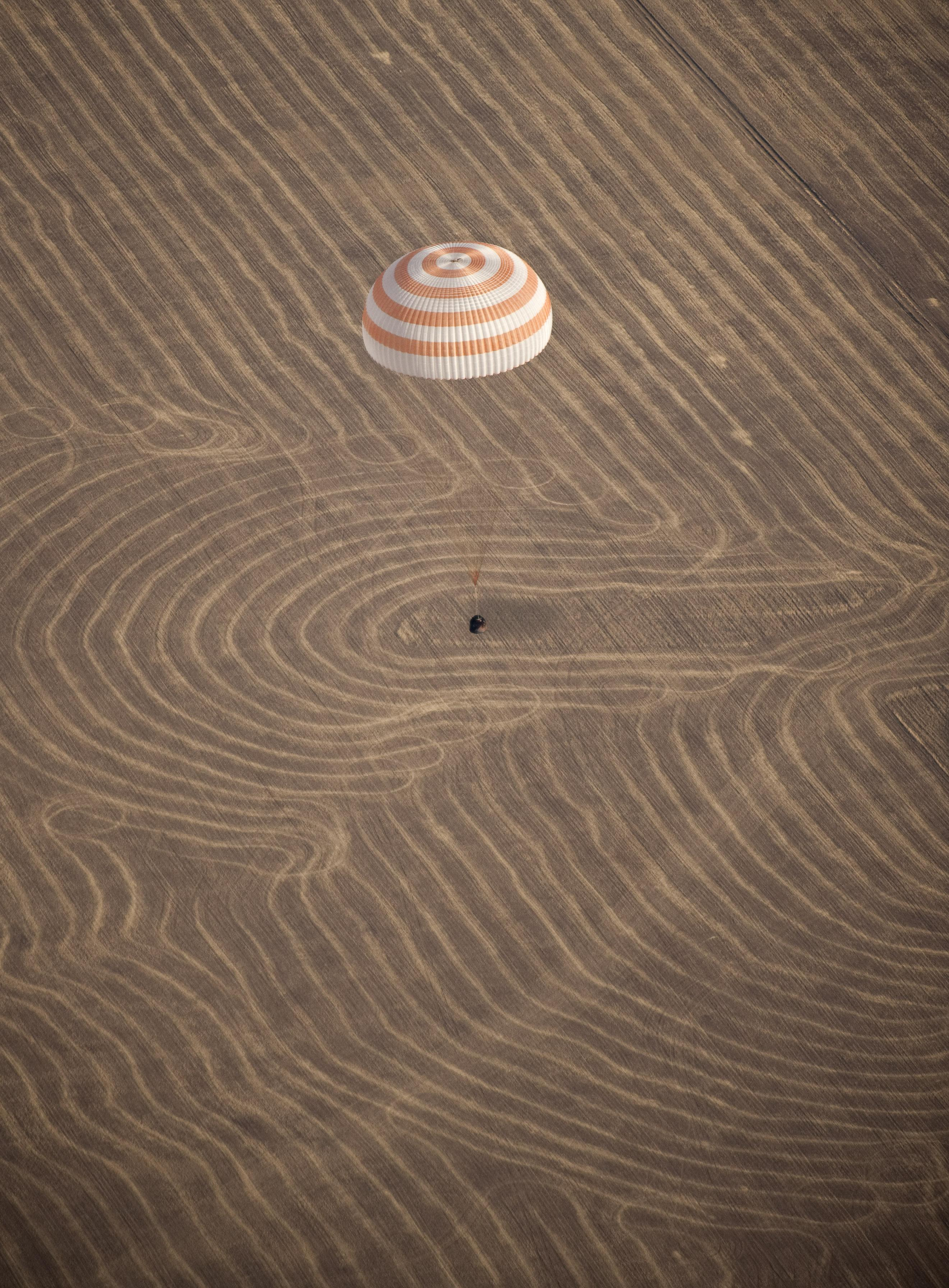

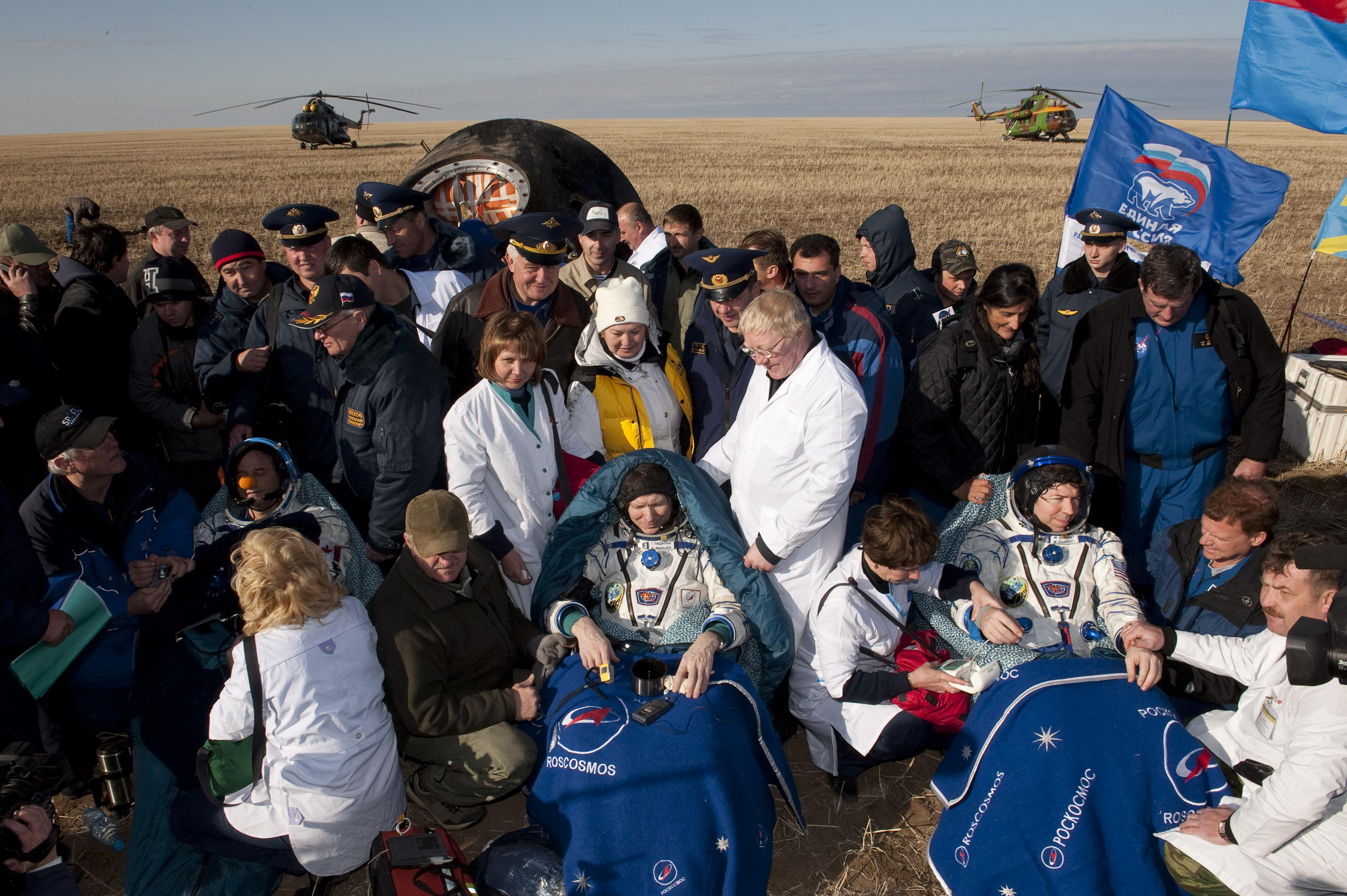

== See also ==
- Extravehicular activity
- List of cumulative spacewalk records
- List of International Space Station spacewalks
- List of spacewalks 2000–2014
