= Michael Barratt (astronaut) =

American aerospace medicine physician and astronaut (born 1959)

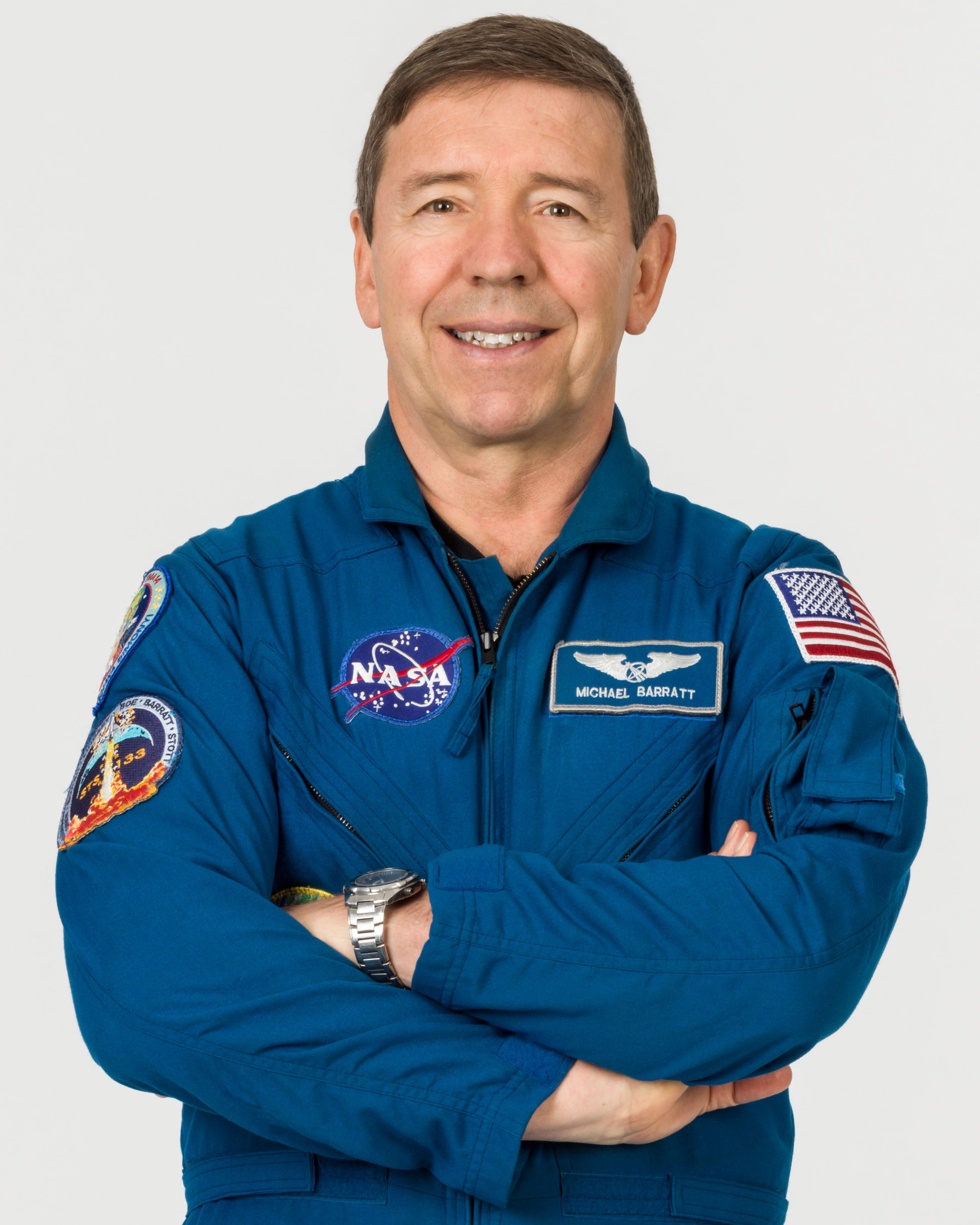
- Barratt in 2023
- Born: Michael Reed Barratt; April 16, 1959 (age 67); Vancouver, Washington, U.S.
- Education: University of Washington (BS); Northwestern University (MD); Wright State University (MS)
- Space career

NASA astronaut
- Time in space: 446 days, 15 hours, 21 minutes
- Selection: NASA Group 18 (2000)
- Total EVAs: 3
- Total EVA time: 5 hours, 37 minutes
- Missions: Soyuz TMA-14 (Expedition 19/20); STS-133; SpaceX Crew-8 (Expedition 70/71/72)

Michael Reed Barratt (born April 16, 1959) is an American physician and a NASA astronaut. Board certified in internal and aerospace medicine, he served as a flight surgeon for NASA before his selection as an astronaut and has played a role in developing NASA's space medicine programs for both the Shuttle–Mir program and International Space Station. His first spaceflight was a long-duration mission to the International Space Station as a flight engineer on the Expedition 19 and 20 crew. In March 2011, Barratt completed his second spaceflight as a crew member of STS-133. Barratt made a second long-duration mission to the International Space Station as a flight engineer on the Expedition 70, 71, and 72 crew and also served as the pilot on the SpaceX Crew-8 mission.

== Education ==
Barratt graduated from Camas High School in 1977. He graduated from the University of Washington in 1981 with a Bachelor of Science degree in zoology, going on to earn an M.D. from Northwestern University in 1985. He completed a three-year residency in internal medicine at Northwestern University in 1988; his Chief Residency year was at Veterans Administration Lakeside Hospital in Chicago in 1989. In 1991, Barratt completed both a residency and a Master of Science in aerospace medicine jointly run by Wright State University, NASA, and Wright-Patterson Air Force Base. He is board certified in Internal and Aerospace Medicine.

Barratt holds a private pilot's license and has been qualified on NASA's T-38 Talons.

== NASA career ==
Barratt first came to NASA's Johnson Space Center in May 1991 as a project physician working for KRUG Life Sciences, serving on the Health Maintenance Facility Project as manager of the Hyperbaric and Respiratory Subsystems for the Space Station Freedom project. In July 1992, he was hired by NASA as an aviation medical examiner working in Space Shuttle Medical Operations.

In July 1993, Barratt was one of a team of the first three Americans invited to witness the recovery of a Soyuz spacecraft. Asked to help evaluate the potential of the Soyuz as a Crew Return Vehicle for a NASA space station, he flew with the recovery team that picked up the crew of Soyuz TM-16 after they landed in Kazakhstan. (The Soyuz was ultimately chosen as the return vehicle for the International Space Station).

In January 1994, he was assigned to the Shuttle-Mir Program. He spent over 12 months working and training in the Gagarin Cosmonaut Training Center in Star City, Russia as one of two flight surgeons supporting Norman Thagard and his backup Bonnie Dunbar, a role that often included negotiations to resolve different approaches to medicine by NASA and Russian doctors. Barratt and fellow flight surgeon David Ward developed a Mir Supplemental Medical Kit to augment Russian equipment on Mir and developed a program of training for its use, taught to both NASA astronauts and Russian cosmonauts.

Thagard launched to Mir aboard Soyuz TM-21 and returned to earth on STS-71; during the 115-day flight, Barratt and Ward effectively served as CAPCOMs for the NASA Shuttle-Mir team in addition to their duties as flight surgeons.

From July 1995 through July 1998, Barratt served as medical operations lead for the International Space Station (ISS). A frequent traveler to Russia, he worked with counterparts at Star City and the Institute of Biomedical Problems and other ISS partner centers, developing medical procedures, training, and equipment for ISS. Barratt served as lead crew surgeon for ISS Expedition 1 from July 1998 until selected as an astronaut candidate. He serves as associate editor for space medicine for the journal Aviation, Space, and Environmental Medicine and is senior editor of the textbook Principles of Clinical Medicine for Space Flight.

Barratt was selected by NASA to join Astronaut Group 18 as a mission specialist in July 2000. Barratt reported for training in August 2000. Following the completion of two years of training and evaluation, he was assigned technical duties in the Astronaut Office Station Operations Branch.

=== NEEMO 7 ===
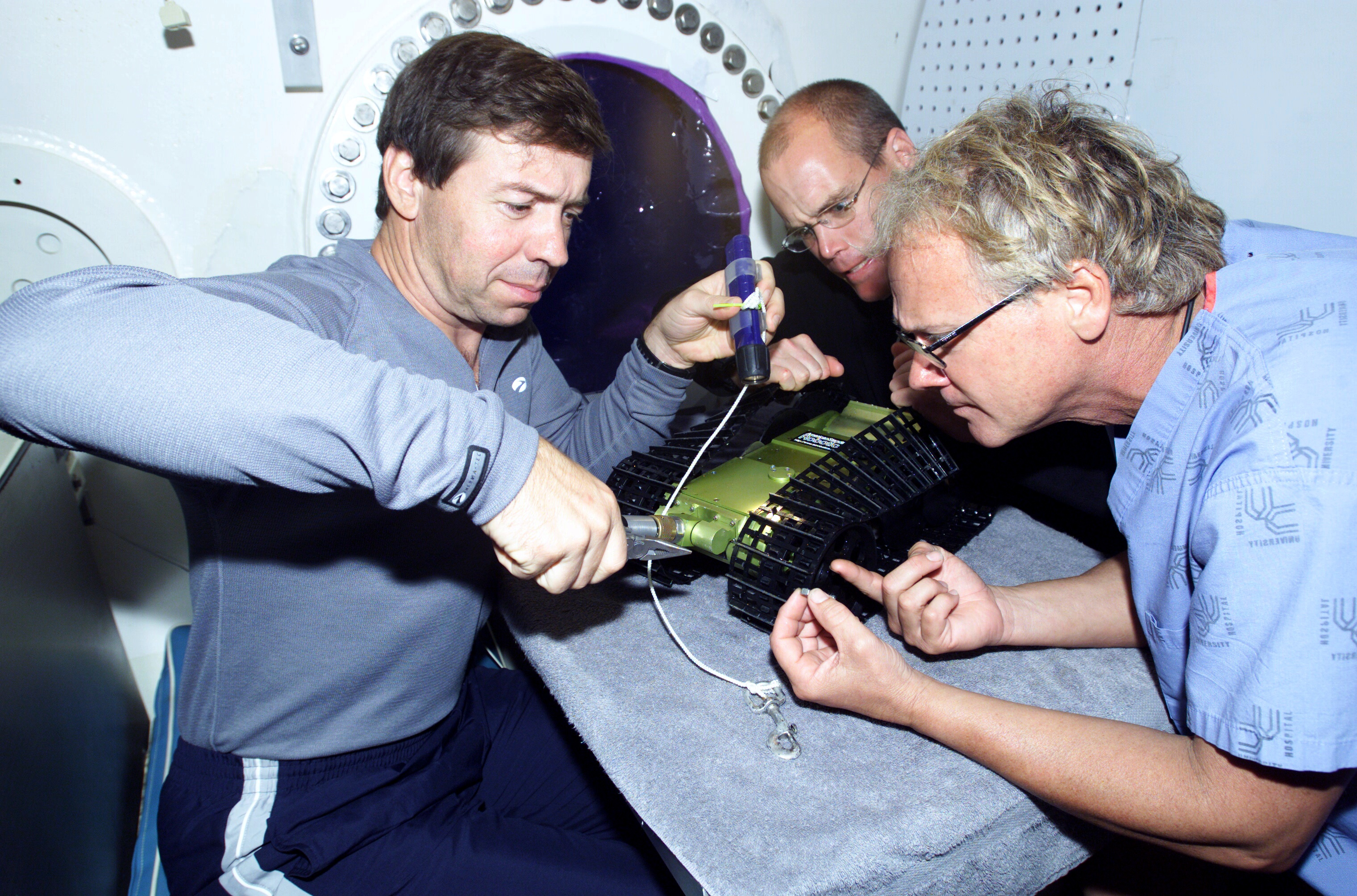
Aquanaut Michael Barratt, Canadian physician Craig McKinley, and Aquarius underwater habitat technician Billy Cooksey work with a remotely operated rover during the NEEMO 7 undersea exploration mission in October 2004.

In October 2004, Barratt served as an aquanaut during the NEEMO 7 mission aboard the Aquarius underwater laboratory, living and working underwater for eleven days. During NEEMO 7 the crew tested technologies and procedures for remote surgery, as well as using virtual reality for telemedicine.

=== Expedition 19/20 ===
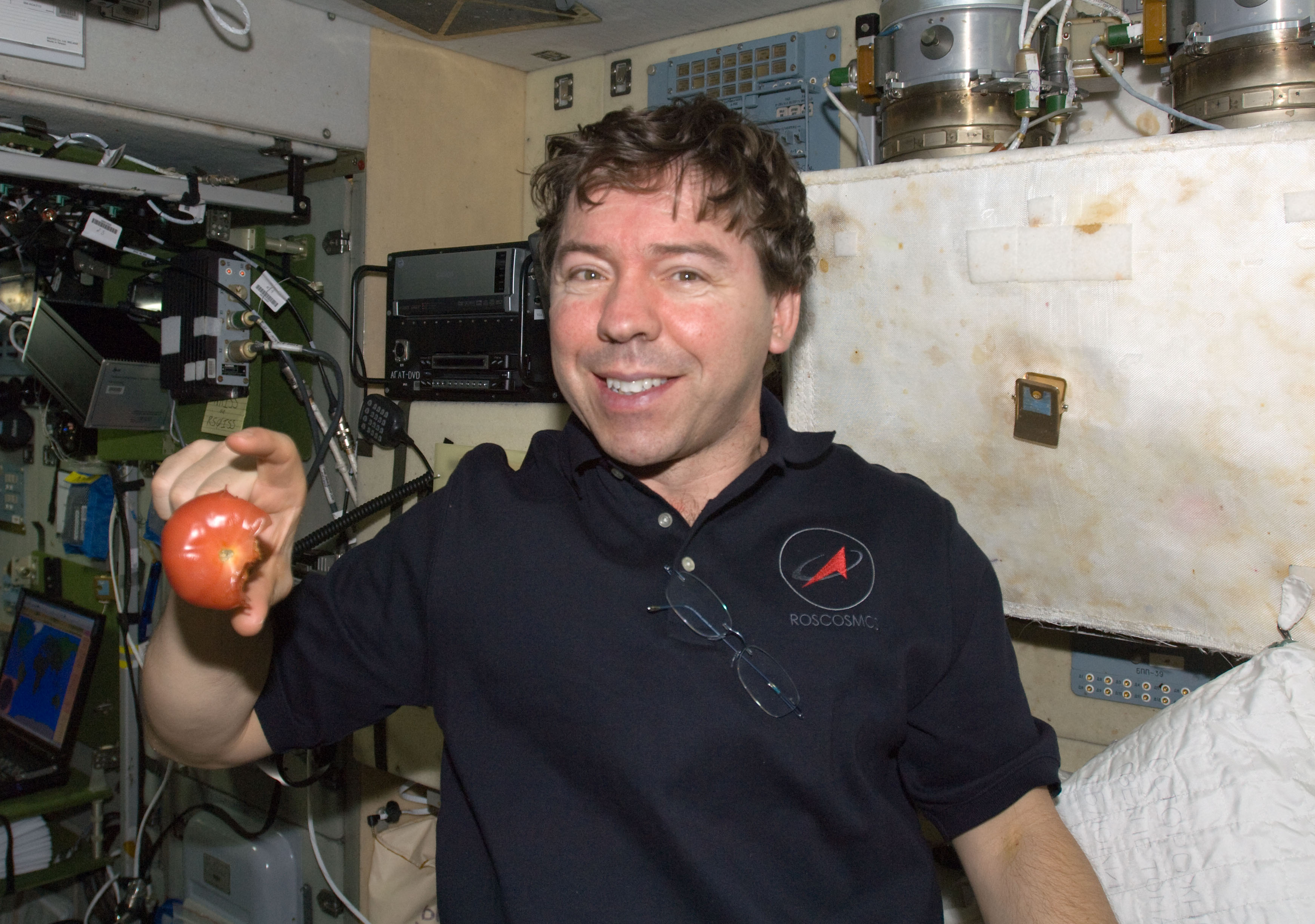
Expedition 20 Flight Engineer Barratt with a floating tomato in the Zvezda service module of the International Space Station

Barratt was assigned to the Expedition 19 crew in February 2008 and launched to the International Space Station in March 2009 aboard Soyuz TMA-14. His stay aboard the ISS continued until the end of Expedition 20 in October 2009.

During Expedition 20, Barratt performed both an EVA and IVA together with Gennady Padalka. The first EVA, on June 5, 2009, lasted for 4 hours and 54 minutes and prepared the Zvezda service module transfer compartment for the arrival of the Poisk module, installed docking antenna for the module, photographed an antenna for evaluation on the ground, and photographed the Strela-2 crane. The second was an internal spacewalk (IVA) in the depressurized Zvezda transfer compartment to replace one of the Zvezda hatches with a docking cone in preparation for the docking of the Poisk module later in 2009. This IVA lasted 12 minutes.

Barratt returned to Earth on October 11, 2009 after spending 198 days, 16 hours, and 42 minutes in space on Soyuz TMA-14 along with Padalka and space tourist Guy Laliberté.

=== STS-133 ===
Barratt next flew to space as a mission specialist on STS-133, the final flight of Space Shuttle Discovery. The mission launched on February 24, 2011, and landed on March 9, 2011. The mission transported several items to the space station, including the Permanent Multipurpose Module Leonardo, which was left permanently docked at one of the station's ports. The shuttle also carried the third of four ExPRESS Logistics Carriers to the ISS, as well as a humanoid robot called Robonaut. During the mission Barratt was in charge of robotics activities. The total duration of STS-133 was 12 days, 19 hours, and 4 minutes.

=== Post-Shuttle era ===
From January 2012 through April 2013, Barratt was manager of the Human Research Program at NASA Johnson Space Center, researching the health and performance risks associated with long-duration human spaceflight and mitigating them.

In 2013, Barratt served as cavenaut during the ESA CAVES training in Sardinia, alongside fellow NASA astronaut Jack Fisher, CSA astronaut Jeremy Hansen, JAXA astronaut Satoshi Furukawa, ESA astronaut Paolo Nespoli, and Roscosmos cosmonaut Aleksey Ovchinin.

=== Expedition 70/71/72 ===
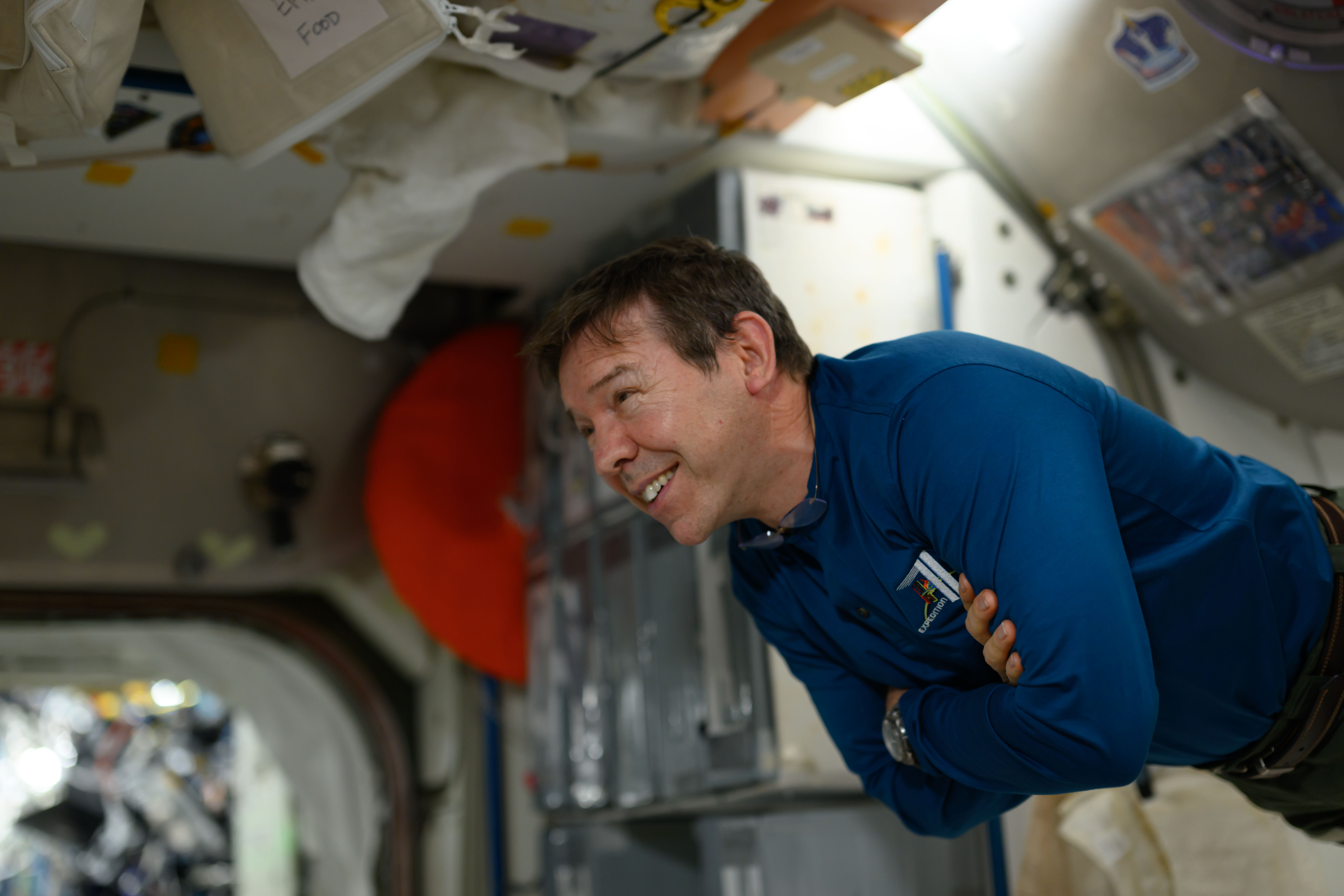
Barratt in the Harmony module during Expedition 71

Barratt made a second long-duration mission to the International Space Station as a flight engineer on the Expedition 70, 71, and 72 crew and also served as the pilot on the SpaceX Crew-8 mission, which launched on March 4, 2024. The mission successfully splashed down on October 25, 2024, concluding a nearly eight-month science mission.

== Personal life ==
Born in Vancouver, Washington, Barratt considers Camas, Washington to be his hometown. He is married to Dr. Michelle Lynne Barratt (née Sasynuik); they reside in League City, Texas, and have five children. His father and mother, Joseph and Donna Barratt, reside in Camas. His personal and recreational interests include family and church activities, writing, sailing, and boat restoration and maintenance.

== Organizations ==
Aerospace Medical Association; American College of Physicians; Alpha Omega Alpha Medical Honor Society; American Institute for the Advancement of Science.

== Awards and honors ==
Barratt has received several awards and honors:

- Hubertus Strughold Award, 2011
- W. Randolph Lovelace Award (1998), Society of NASA Flight Surgeons
- Rotary National Award for Space Achievement Foundation Nominee (1998)
- Melbourne W. Boynton Award (1995), American Astronautical Society
- USAF Flight Surgeons Julian Ward Award (1992)
- Wright State University Outstanding Graduate Student, Aerospace Medicine (1991)
- Alpha Omega Alpha medical honor society, Northwestern University Medical School, Chicago, IL (1988)
- Phi Beta Kappa, University of Washington, Seattle, WA (1981)
