= Frank De Winne =

Belgian astronaut (born 1961)

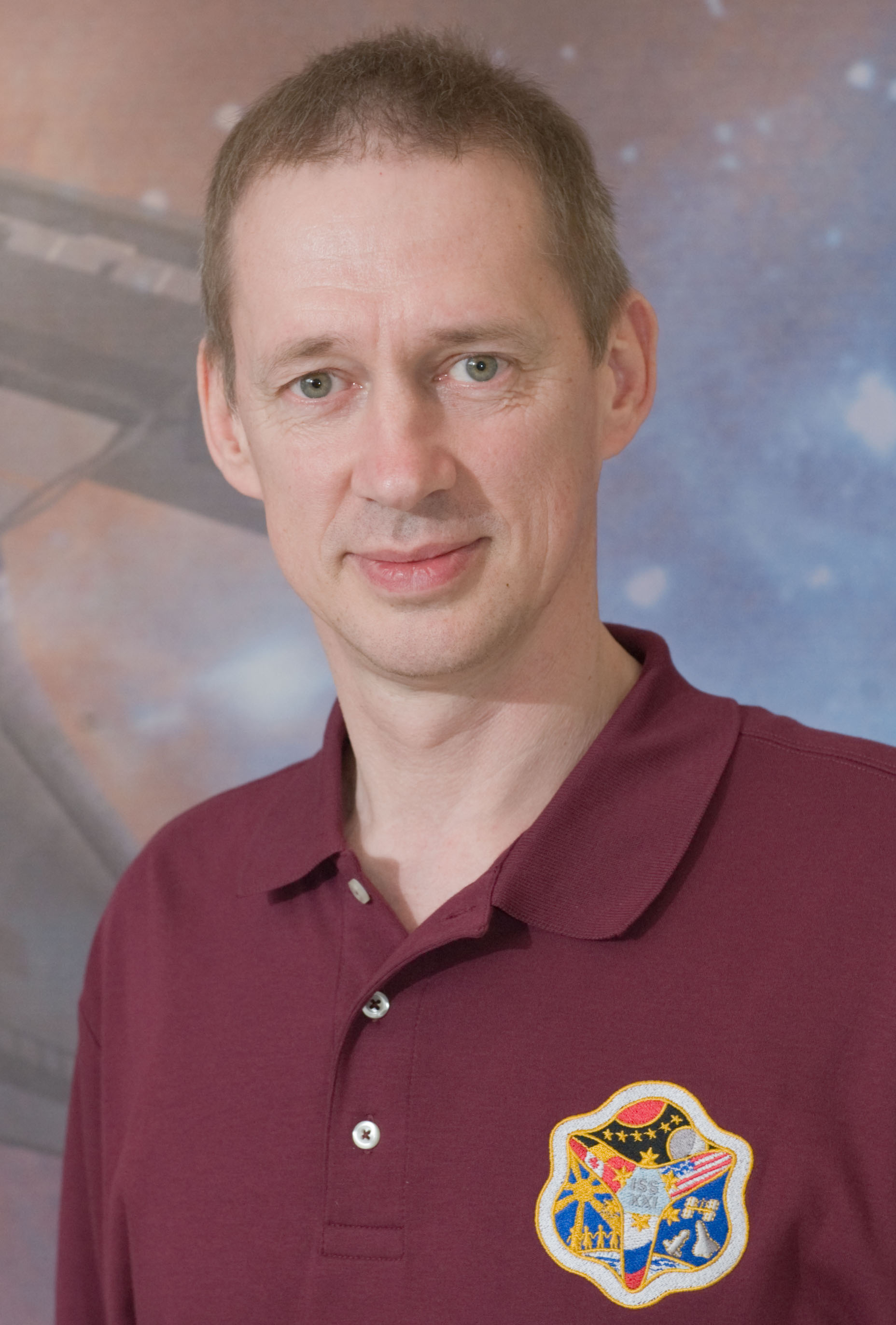
- Born: 25 April 1961 (age 65); Ghent, Belgium
- Occupation: Test pilot
- Space career

ESA astronaut
- Status: Retired
- Rank: Brigadier General, Belgian Air Force
- Time in space: 198 days, 17 hours, 34 minutes
- Selection: 1998 ESA Group
- Missions: Soyuz TMA-1/TM-34; Soyuz TMA-15 (Expedition 20/21)
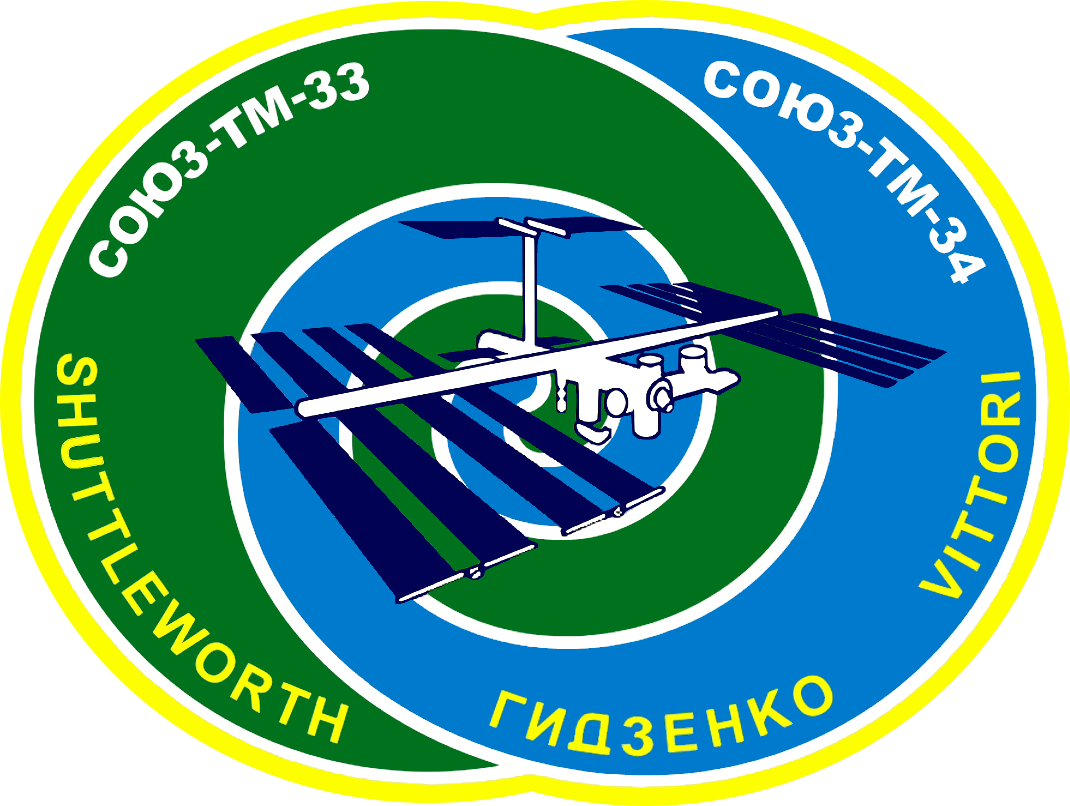
- Mission insignia

Frank De Winne (born 25 April 1961, in Ledeberg, Belgium) is a Belgian Air Component officer and an ESA astronaut. He is Belgium's second person in space (after Dirk Frimout). He was the first ESA astronaut to command a space mission when he served as commander of ISS Expedition 21. He serves currently as Head of the European Astronaut Centre of the European Space Agency in Cologne/Germany (Köln).

== Education ==
De Winne graduated in 1979 from the Royal School of Cadets in Lier. In 1984, he graduated from the Royal Military Academy with the degree of Master of Sciences in Engineering (Polytechnics).

== Military career ==
De Winne followed the elementary flying school of the Belgian Air Component at Goetsenhoven. After graduating he flew Dassault Mirage 5 airplanes for the Air Force until he was attached to SAGEM in Paris to work on the safety of the Mirage. In 1991, De Winne completed the Staff Course at the Defence College in Brussels with the highest distinction. In 1992, De Winne received his degree as test pilot from the British Empire Test Pilots' School in Boscombe Down, receiving the McKenna Trophy as well.

From December 1992, Major of Royal Belgian Air Component De Winne operated as a test pilot for the Belgian Air Force. From January 1994 until April 1995, he was responsible for flight safety of the 1st Fighter Wing operating from Beauvechain air base. From April 1995 to July 1996, he was attached as senior test pilot to the European Participating Air Forces at Edwards Air Force Base in California where he worked on the mid-life update of the F-16 aircraft, focusing on radar testing. From 1996 to August 1998, he was senior test pilot in the Belgian Air Force, responsible for all test programmes and for all pilot-vehicle interfaces for future aircraft/software updates.

On 12 February 1997 De Winne encountered engine problems while flying in an F-16 Fighting Falcon over densely populated area near Leeuwarden. After the onboard computer failed, De Winne was faced with the choice of crashing in the IJsselmeer or of ejecting over densely populated area. However, De Winne was able to land his crippled plane at Leeuwarden air base, a feat which earned him the Joe Bill Dryden Semper Viper Award, the first non-American ever to get this award.

In August 1998, De Winne became commander of the 349 Squadron operating from Kleine Brogel. During the NATO Operation Allied Force in the Balkans, De Winne commanded the Dutch-Belgian Deployable Air Task Force. He completed 17 combat sorties. For his achievement during this operation, the Dutch government awarded him the degree of Officer of the Order of Orange-Nassau.

De Winne has collected over 2.300 flying hours in Mirage, F-16, Tornado and Jaguar. He also serves as the Chairman of the Belgian Armed Forces Flying Personnel Association.

He currently holds the rank of Brigadier-General.

== Astronaut career ==
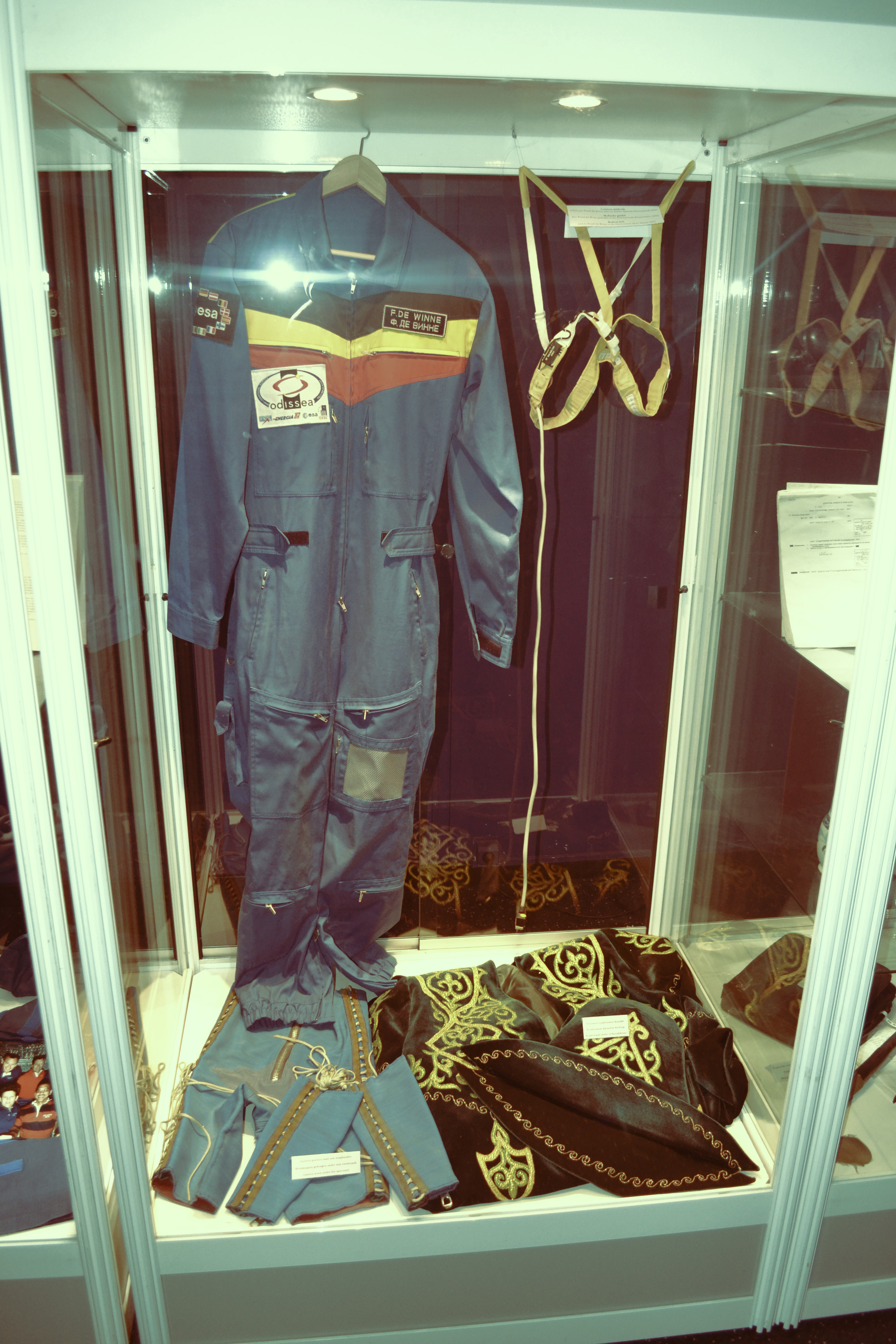
Russian Boilersuit of Belgian Astronaut Frank de Winne at the Euro Space Center in Belgium

In October 1998, Frank De Winne was selected as an astronaut candidate by the European Space Agency. In January 2000, he joined the European Astronaut Corps, whose homebase is the European Astronaut Centre in Cologne, Germany. He provided technical support for the X38 Crew Return Vehicle project division within the Directorate of Manned Spaceflight and Microgravity, located at the European Space Research and Technology Centre in Noordwijk, the Netherlands. In August 2001, De Winne took up training at the Yuri Gagarin Cosmonauts Training Center near Moscow, Russia. Training included elements of Basic Training for the International Space Station as well as training as a Soyuz flight engineer.

De Winne's first spaceflight (30 October - 10 November 2002) was a trip as a flight engineer to the International Space Station in 2002, traveling to the station aboard Soyuz TMA-1 and returning aboard Soyuz TM-34. During his time in space, De Winne carried out successfully a programme of 23 experiments in the fields of life and physical sciences and education.

He was the back-up crew member for Léopold Eyharts of ISS Expedition 16.

On 20 September 2007, ESA announced that De Winne would take part in a six-month mission aboard the International Space Station in 2009. On 21 November 2008, NASA announced changes to the expedition schedule with De Winne becoming commander of Expedition 21. On 27 May 2009, De Winne launched aboard Soyuz TMA-15, becoming the first astronaut from the European Space Agency to command a space mission.

== Honors, awards, and arms ==
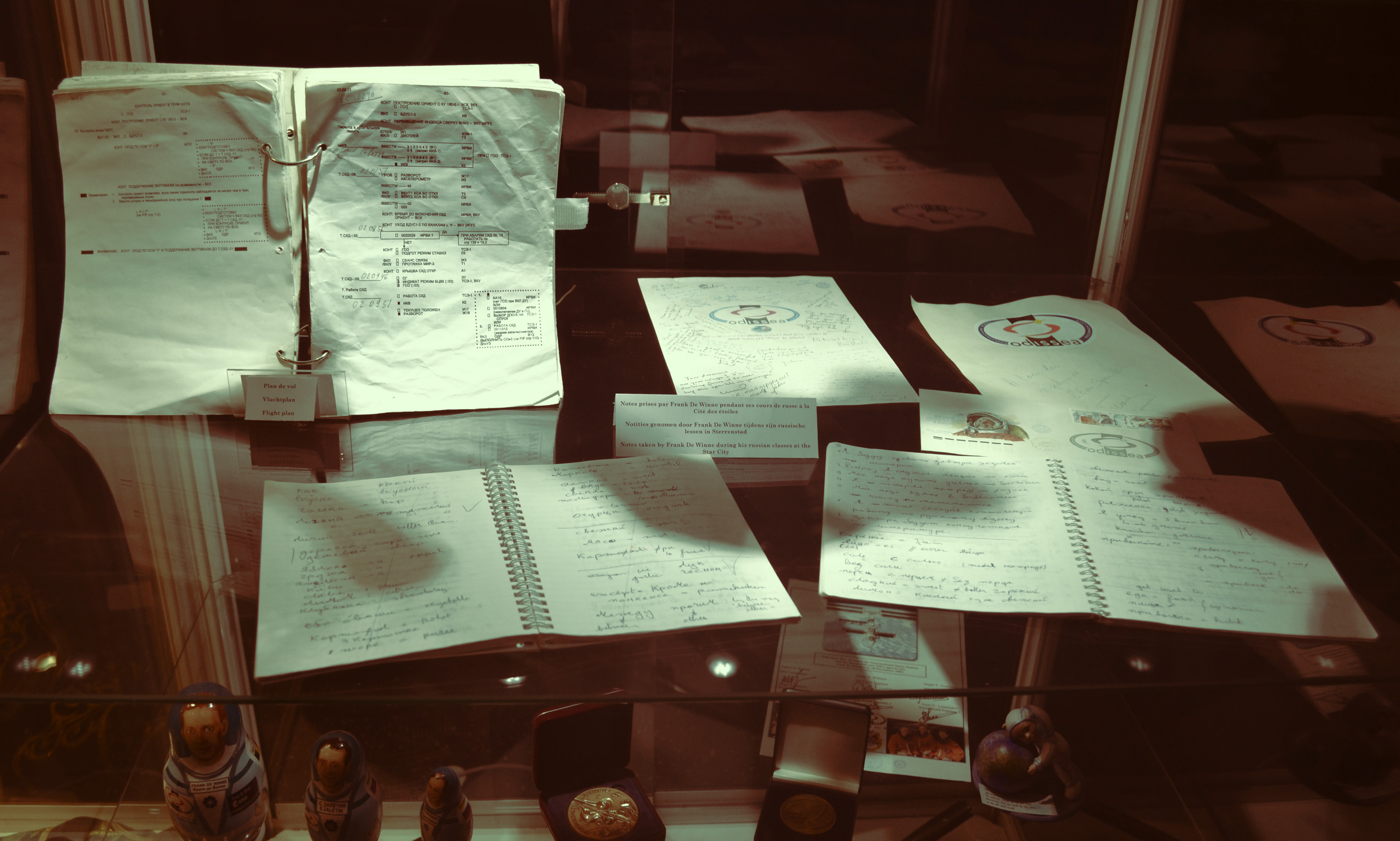
flight plan and personal notes of Belgian Astronaut Frank de Winne at the Euro Space Center in Belgium

- Officer of the Order of Leopold
- Officer of the Order of the Crown
- Officer of the Order of Leopold II
- Military Cross 1st class
- Campaign Medal for foreign operations
- NATO Medal for Kosovo
- Officer of the Order of Oranje-Nassau (Netherlands)
- Member of the Order of Friendship (Russian Federation)
- Royal Aeronautical Society Silver Medal (2010)
- McKenna Trophy
- Joe Bill Dryden Semper Viper Award
- On 20 December 2002 Frank De Winne was ennobled a viscount in the Belgian nobility as a reward for his space achievements.
- In 2003, De Winne received an honorary doctorate from Hasselt University.
- Honorary doctorate from University of Antwerp
- Honorary doctorate from Ghent University
- Honorary doctorate from University of Liège
- Honorary doctorate form University of Mons

Coat of arms of Frank De Winne
| Description De sable à un tourteau d'azur bordé d'argent mouvant de la pointe et du flanc senestre, accompagné au chef dextre de huit étoiles d'argent ordonnées en Northrop B-2 Spirit posé en bande, à une capusle Soyouz d'or posée en bande brochante en abîme |

== Personal ==
De Winne is married to Lena Clarke De Winne. He has three children from a previous marriage. He enjoys football, small PC applications and gastronomy. De Winne appeared on screen during the concerts of rock band U2 on their 360° Tour (and on their U2360° at the Rose Bowl concert video) in pre-recorded segments from the International Space Station, reciting lines from the band's songs "Your Blue Room" and "In a Little While".

| Preceded by Gennady Padalka | ISS Expedition Commander; 30 October to 1 December 2009 | Succeeded by Jeffrey N. Williams |
