= List of ESA space expeditions =

This is a list of the European Space Agency's short and long duration expeditions to Mir and the International Space Station. The dates below each name indicate the period of stay aboard the station.

== List ==
Nº	Crew	Launch (UTC)	Landing (UTC)	Ref.
Mir
Aragatz; 28 November 1988 – 21 December 1988
1		26 November 1988 15:49:33 (Soyuz TM-7)	21 December 1988 09:56:40 (Soyuz TM-6)	
1	(France) Jean-Loup Chrétien	24d 18h 07m 06s		
Austromir-91; 4 October 1991 – 9 October 1991
2	(Austria) Franz Viehböck	2 October 1991 05:59:38 (Soyuz TM-13)	10 October 1991 04:12:28 (Soyuz TM-12)	
2	(Austria) Franz Viehböck	7d 22h 12m 40s		
Mir-92; 19 March 1992 – 25 March 1992
3		17 March 1992 10:54:30 (Soyuz TM-14)	25 March 1992 08:51:02 (Soyuz TM-13)	
3	(Germany) Klaus-Dietrich Flade	7d 21h 56m 32s		
Antares; 29 July 1992 – 9 August 1992
4		27 July 1992 06:08:42 (Soyuz TM-15)	10 August 1992 01:05:02 (Soyuz TM-14)	
4	(France) Michel Tognini	13d 18h 56m 20s		
Altair; 3 July 1993 – 22 July 1993
5		1 July 1993 14:32:57 (Soyuz TM-17)	22 July 1993 06:41:50 (Soyuz TM-16)	
5	(France) Jean-Pierre Haigneré	20d 16h 08m 52s		
Euromir 94; 6 October 1994 – 4 November 1994
6		3 October 1994 22:42:29 (Soyuz TM-20)	4 November 1994 11:18:25 (Soyuz TM-19)	
6	(Germany) Ulf Merbold	31d 12h 35m 55s		
Euromir 95; 5 September 1995 – 29 February 1996
7		3 September 1995 09:00:23 (Soyuz TM-22)	29 February 1996 10:42:08 (Soyuz TM-22)	
7	(Germany) Thomas Reiter	179d 01h 41m 46s		
Cassiopée; 19 August 1996 – 2 September 1996
8		17 August 1996 13:18:03 (Soyuz TM-24)	2 September 1996 07:41:40 (Soyuz TM-23)	
8	(France) Claudie Haigneré	15d 18h 23m 37s		
Mir 97; 12 February 1997 – 2 March 1997
9		10 February 1997 14:09:30 (Soyuz TM-25)	2 March 1997 06:44:16 (Soyuz TM-24)	
9	(Germany) Reinhold Ewald	19d 16h 34m 46s		
Pégase; 31 January 1998 – 19 February 1998
10		29 January 1998 16:33:41 (Soyuz TM-27)	19 February 1998 09:09:30 (Soyuz TM-26)	
10	(France) Léopold Eyharts	20d 16h 35m 48s		
Perseus; 22 February 1999 – 27 August 1999
11		20 February 1999 04:18:01 (Soyuz TM-29)	28 August 1999 00:34:20 (Soyuz TM-29)	
11	(France) Jean-Pierre Haigneré	188d 20h 16m 19s		
International Space Station
Andromède; 23 October 2001 – 31 October 2001
12		21 October 2001 08:59:34 (Soyuz TM-33)	31 October 2001 04:59:25 (Soyuz TM-32)	
12	(France) Claudie Haigneré	9d 19h 59m 50s		
Marco Polo; 27 April 2002 – 5 May 2002
13		25 April 2002 06:26:35 (Soyuz TM-34)	5 May 2002 04:59:25 (Soyuz TM-33)	
13	(Italy) Roberto Vittori	9d 21h 25m 05s		
Odissea; 1 November 2002 – 9 November 2002
14		30 October 2002 03:11:10 (Soyuz TMA-1)	10 November 2002 00:04:20 (Soyuz TM-34)	
14	(Belgium) Frank De Winne	10d 20h 53m 09s		
Cervantes; 20 October 2003 – 27 October 2003
15		18 October 2003 05:38:03 (Soyuz TMA-3)	28 October 2003 02:40:20 (Soyuz TMA-2)	
15	(Spain) Pedro Duque	9d 21h 02m 17s		
Delta; 21 April 2004 – 29 April 2004
16		19 April 2004 03:19:00 (Soyuz TMA-4)	30 April 2004 00:11:15 (Soyuz TMA-3)	
16	(Netherlands) André Kuipers	10d 20h 52m 15s		
Eneide; 17 April 2005 – 24 April 2005
17		15 April 2005 00:46:25 (Soyuz TMA-6)	26 April 2005 22:08:27 (Soyuz TMA-5)	
17	(Italy) Roberto Vittori	9d 21h 22m 02s		
Astrolab; 6 July 2006 – 19 December 2006
18		4 July 2006 18:37:54 (STS-121)	22 December 2006 22:31:58 (STS-116)	
18	(Germany) Thomas Reiter	171d 03h 54m 03s		
Celsius; 11 December 2006 – 19 December 2006
19		10 December 2006 01:47:35 (STS-116)	22 December 2006 22:31:58 (STS-116)	
19	(Sweden) Christer Fuglesang	12d 20h 44m 23s		
Esperia; 25 October 2007 – 5 November 2007
20		23 October 2007 15:38:18 (STS-120)	7 November 2007 18:01:16 (STS-120)	
20	(Italy) Paolo Nespoli	15d 02h 22m 57s		
OasISS; 29 May 2009 – 1 December 2009
21		27 May 2009 18:34:53 (Soyuz TMA-15)	1 December 2009 07:16:30 (Soyuz TMA-15)	
21	(Belgium) Frank De Winne	187d 20h 41m 38s		
Alissé; 31 August 2009 – 8 September 2009
22		29 August 2009 03:59:36 (STS-128)	12 September 2009 00:53:20 (STS-128)	
22	(Sweden) Christer Fuglesang	13d 20h 53m 43s		
MagISStra; 17 December 2010 – 23 May 2011
23		15 December 2010 19:09:24 (Soyuz TMA-20)	24 May 2011 02:26:40 (Soyuz TMA-20)	
23	(Italy) Paolo Nespoli	159d 07h 17m 15s		
DAMA; 18 May 2011 – 30 May 2011
24		16 May 2011 12:56:27 (STS-134)	1 June 2011 06:34:50 (STS-134)	
24	(Italy) Roberto Vittori	15d 17h 38m 22s		
PromISSe; 23 December 2011 – 1 July 2012
25		21 December 2011 13:16:14 (Soyuz TMA-03M)	1 July 2012 08:14:41 (Soyuz TMA-03M)	
25	(Netherlands) André Kuipers	192d 18h 58m 28s		
Volare; 29 May 2013 – 10 November 2013
26		28 May 2013 20:31:24 (Soyuz TMA-09M)	11 November 2013 02:49:00 (Soyuz TMA-09M)	
26	(Italy) Luca Parmitano	166d 06h 17m 36s		
Blue Dot; 29 May 2014 – 10 November 2014
27		28 May 2014 19:57:40 (Soyuz TMA-13M)	10 November 2014 00:31:29 (Soyuz TMA-13M)	
27	(Germany) Alexander Gerst	165d 08h 01m 09s		
Futura; 24 November 2014 – 11 June 2015
28		23 November 2014 21:01:13 (Soyuz TMA-15M)	11 June 2015 13:43:56 (Soyuz TMA-15M)	
28	(Italy) Samantha Cristoforetti	199d 16h 42m 43s		
Iriss; 4 September 2015 – 11 September 2015
29		2 September 2015 04:37:43 (Soyuz TMA-18M)	12 September 2015 00:51:30 (Soyuz TMA-16M)	
29	(Denmark) Andreas Mogensen	9d 20h 13m 47s		
Principia; 15 December 2015 – 18 June 2016
30		15 December 2015 11:03:09 (Soyuz TMA-19M)	18 June 2016 09:15:06 (Soyuz TMA-19M)	
30	(United Kingdom) Timothy Peake	185d 22h 11m 57s		
Proxima; 19 November 2016 – 2 June 2017
31		17 November 2016 20:20:13 (Soyuz MS-03)	2 June 2017 14:10:30 (Soyuz MS-03)	
31	(France) Thomas Pesquet	196d 17h 50m 18s		
Vita; 28 July 2017 – 14 December 2017
32		28 July 2017 15:41:12 (Soyuz MS-05)	14 December 2017 08:37:47 (Soyuz MS-05)	
32	(Italy) Paolo Nespoli	138d 16h 56m 35s		
Horizons; 8 June 2018 – 20 December 2018
33		6 June 2018 11:12:39 (Soyuz MS-09)	20 December 2018 05:02:48 (Soyuz MS-09)	
33	(Germany) Alexander Gerst	196d 17h 50m 09s		
Beyond; 20 July 2019 – 6 February 2020
34		20 July 2019 16:28:20 (Soyuz MS-13)	6 February 2020 09:12:21 (Soyuz MS-13)	
34	(Italy) Luca Parmitano	200d 16h 44m 01s		
Alpha; 24 April 2021 – 8 November 2021
35		23 April 2021 09:49:02 (SpaceX Crew-2)	9 November 2021 03:33:15 (SpaceX Crew-2)	
35	(France) Thomas Pesquet	199d 17h 44m 13s		
Cosmic Kiss; 11 November 2021 – 5 May 2022
36		11 November 2021 02:03:30 (SpaceX Crew-3)	6 May 2022 04:43:23 (SpaceX Crew-3)	
36	(Germany) Matthias Maurer	176d 02h 39m 53s		
Minerva; 27 April 2022 – 14 October 2022
37		27 April 2022 07:52:55 (SpaceX Crew-4)	14 October 2022 20:55:27 (SpaceX Crew-4)	
37	(Italy) Samantha Cristoforetti	170d 13h 02m 32s		
Huginn; 26 August 2023 – 12 March 2024
38		26 August 2023 07:27:27 (SpaceX Crew-7)	12 March 2024 09:47 (SpaceX Crew-7)	
38	(Denmark) Andreas Mogensen	199d 02h 19m 33s		
Muninn; 28 January 2024 – 9 February 2024
39		28 January 2024 21:49:11 (Axiom Mission 3)	9 February 2024 13:30 (Axiom Mission 3)	
39	(Sweden) Marcus Wandt	21d 15h 41m		
Ignis; 25 June 2025 – 15 July 2025
40		25 June 2025 06:31 (Axiom Mission 4)	15 July 2025 09:31 (Axiom Mission 4)	
40	(Poland) Sławosz Uznański-Wiśniewski	20d 2h 59m		
Epsilon; 13 February 2026 – 8 October 2026
41		13 February 2026; 10:15:55 (SpaceX Crew-12)	8 October 2026; 08:34:13 (SpaceX Crew-12)	
41	(France) Sophie Adenot	237d 5h 18m		

== See also ==
- List of Mir Expeditions
- List of International Space Station expeditions
- List of visiting expeditions to the International Space Station
- List of Tiangong Space Station expeditions

== Bibliography ==
- O'Sullivan, John (2020). European Missions to the International Space Station (1 ed.). Springer International Publishing. p. 334. doi:10.1007/978-3-030-30326-6. ISBN 9783030303266. S2CID 218934628.
- "ESA - European Astronauts in Space". ESA.
- "Expeditions". planet4598.
