= Zarya (ISS module) =

First module of the International Space Station

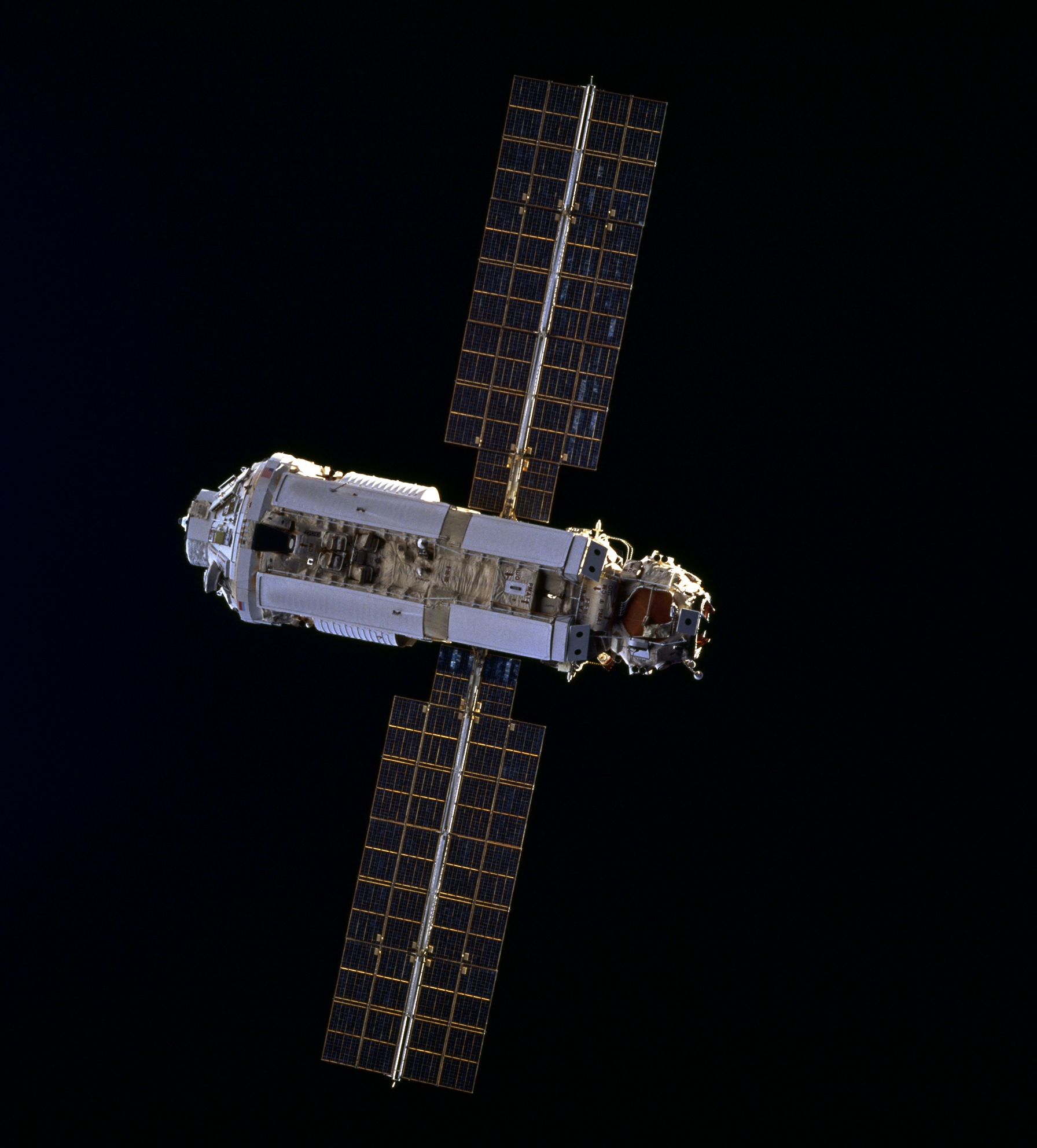
- Zarya as seen by Space Shuttle Endeavour during STS-88

Module statistics
- COSPAR ID: 1998-067A
- Part of: International Space Station
- Launch date: 20 November 1998, 06:40 UTC
- Launch vehicle: Proton-K
- Mass: 19,323 kg (42,600 lb) (Note: Initial in-orbit mass including 3,800 kg (8,400 lb) of propellants)
- Length: 12.56 m (41.2 ft)
- Diameter: 4.11 m (13.5 ft)
- Pressurised volume: 71.5 m^{3} (2,520 cu ft)

Configuration
- Parts of Zarya, click for a closer look with captions

Zarya (Russian: Заря, lit. 'Sunrise'), (Note: "Zarya" has several meanings: "daybreak" or "dawn" (in the morning) or "afterglow", "evening glow" or "sunset" (in the evening), but NASA and Roscosmos translate it as "sunrise.") also known as the Functional Cargo Block (Russian: Функционально-грузовой блок), is the first module of the International Space Station (ISS). Launched on 20 November 1998 atop a Proton-K rocket, the module would serve as the ISS's primary source of power, propulsion, and guidance during its early years. As the ISS expanded, Zarya's role shifted primarily to storage, both internally and in its external fuel tanks. A descendant of the TKS spacecraft used in the Salyut programme, Zarya was built in Russia but financed by the United States. Its name, meaning "sunrise," symbolizes the beginning of a new era of international space cooperation.

== Construction ==
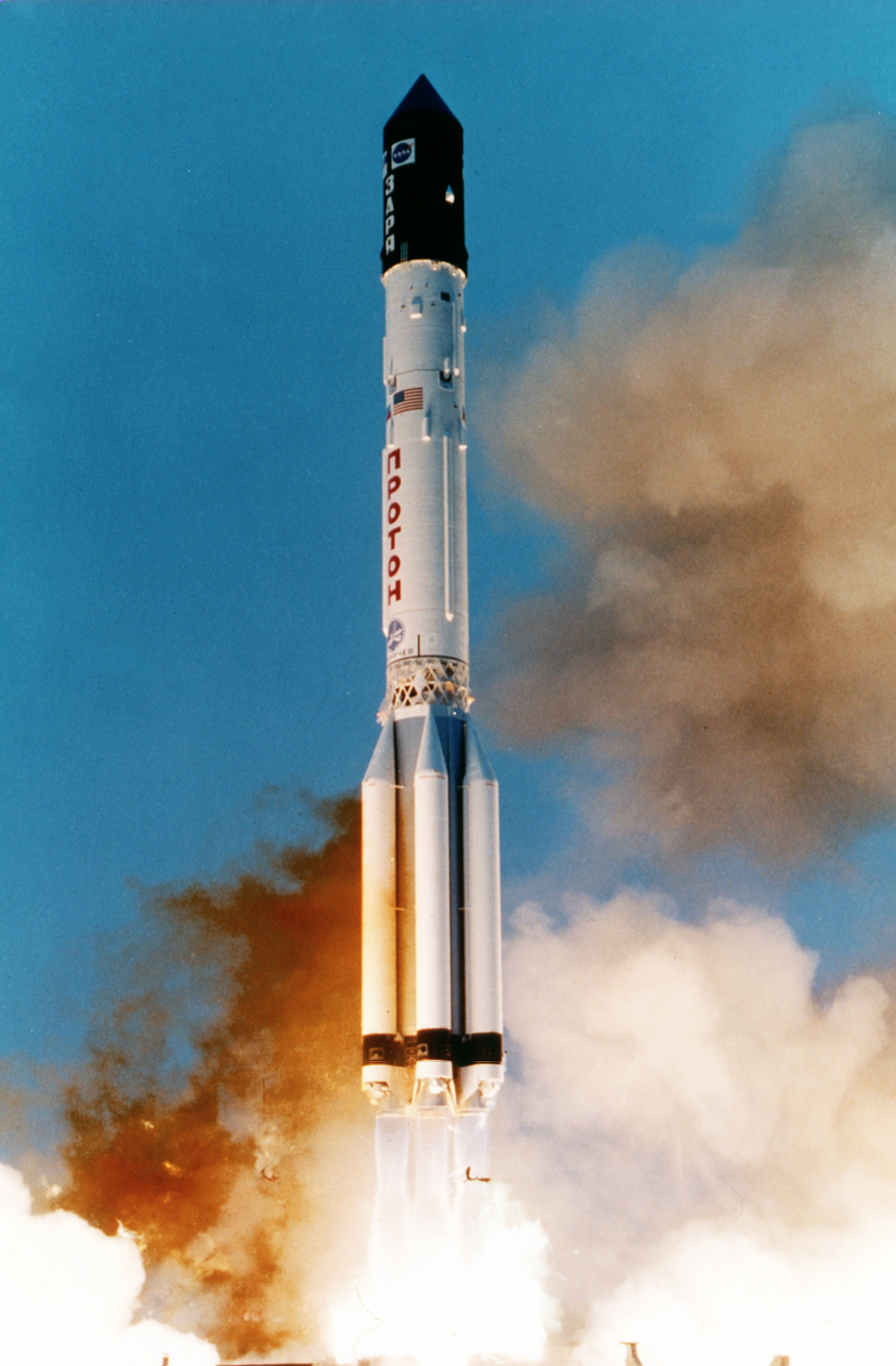
Launch of the Zarya module

The design of Zarya traces its heritage to the TKS spacecraft developed for the Salyut programme. The TKS consisted of two parts: the VA spacecraft, a capsule that housed cosmonauts during launch and re-entry, and the Functional Cargo Block (FGB), which contained a large pressurized cargo compartment. This arrangement allowed the VA capsule to return to Earth while leaving the FGB attached as a station module. FGB modules were added to Salyut 6 and Salyut 7, and five of Mir's modules were also based on the FGB design. An FGB also served as the upper stage of the Polyus spacecraft, that failed to reach orbit on the first Energia launch in 1987.

Zarya itself was built between December 1994 and January 1998 at the Khrunichev State Research and Production Space Center in Moscow, funded by a US$220 million (equivalent to US$480 million in 2025) NASA contract, significantly less than the alternative "Bus-1" design proposed by Lockheed Martin (US$450 million in 1994, equivalent to US$980 million in 2025).

Commentators in the West noted that Zarya was completed and launched more quickly and cheaply than expected in the post-Soviet era. Some suggested that its FGB structure, like that of most Mir modules, was largely assembled from mothballed hardware originally built for the Soviet-era Skif laser weapon program, which was canceled after the loss of the first Polyus spacecraft. Under this interpretation, NASA's funding of Zarya effectively underwrote the cost of the Zvezda service module, Russia's primary early contribution to the ISS.

As part of the NASA contract, Khrunichev also assembled much of a contingency flight spare, FGB-2, which was likewise believed to incorporate unused hardware. Roscosmos later funded its completion as Nauka, which launched to the ISS in 2021.

== Design ==
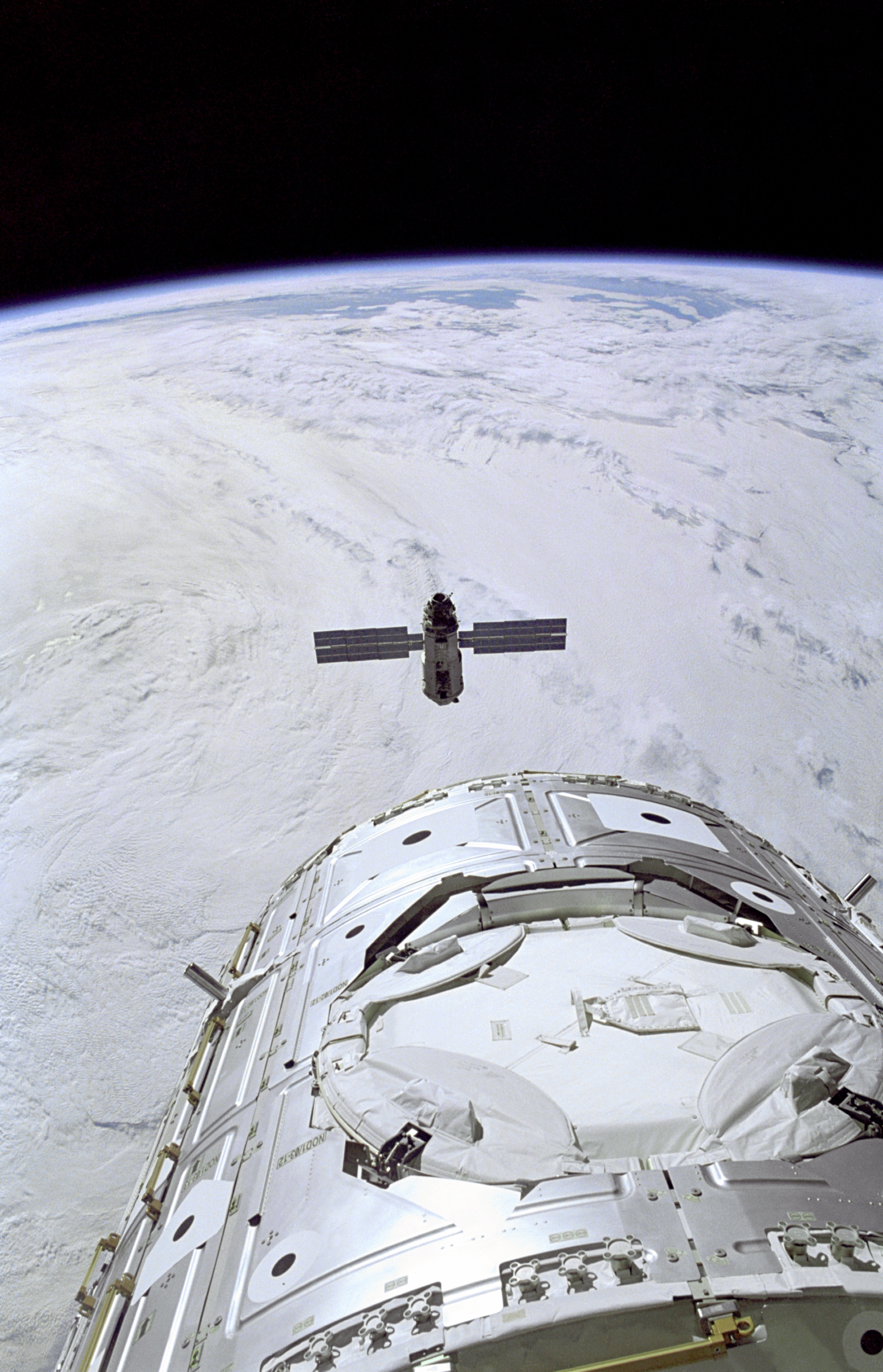
Zarya and Unity rendezvous in 1998

Zarya has a mass of 19,323 kilograms (42,600 lb), is 12.56 meters (41.2 ft) long, and 4.11 meters (13.5 ft) wide at its widest point.

The module has three docking ports: one at the aft end (the rear of the station in its usual orientation and direction of travel) and two on a "docking sphere" at the opposite forward end, one facing forward and the other nadir (Earth-facing). A planned zenith (space-facing) port in the docking sphere was sealed with a spherical cover after a design change. The forward port is attached to Pressurized Mating Adapter-1 (PMA-1), which connects to the Unity module, with PMA-1 serving as the link between the Russian Orbital Segment (ROS) and the US Orbital Segment (USOS). The aft port is connected to the Zvezda service module. The nadir port was used by a couple of visiting Progress cargo spacecraft until 2010, when the Rassvet module was docked; since then, visiting spacecraft have used Rassvet's nadir port instead.

For power, Zarya is equipped with two solar arrays measuring 10.67 by 3.35 meters (35 by 11 ft) and six nickel-cadmium batteries, providing an average of 3 kilowatts of power. The solar arrays have been partially retracted to allow deployment of the P1/S1 radiators on the Integrated Truss Structure. While they still generate power, they no longer produce the full 3 kilowatts (4.0 hp) that was available when fully unfurled.

For propulsion, Zarya has 16 external fuel tanks capable of storing up to 6.1 tonnes (13,000 lb) of propellant. This capability was mandated by NASA in 1997 to ensure that the FGB could independently store and transfer propellant, even if the Zvezda Service Module was delayed. Zarya is equipped with 24 large steering jets, 12 small steering jets, and two large engines previously used for reboost and major orbital maneuvers. With the docking of Zvezda, these engines were permanently disabled. The propellant tanks that once fueled Zarya’s engines are now used to store additional fuel for Zvezda.

== Launch and flight ==
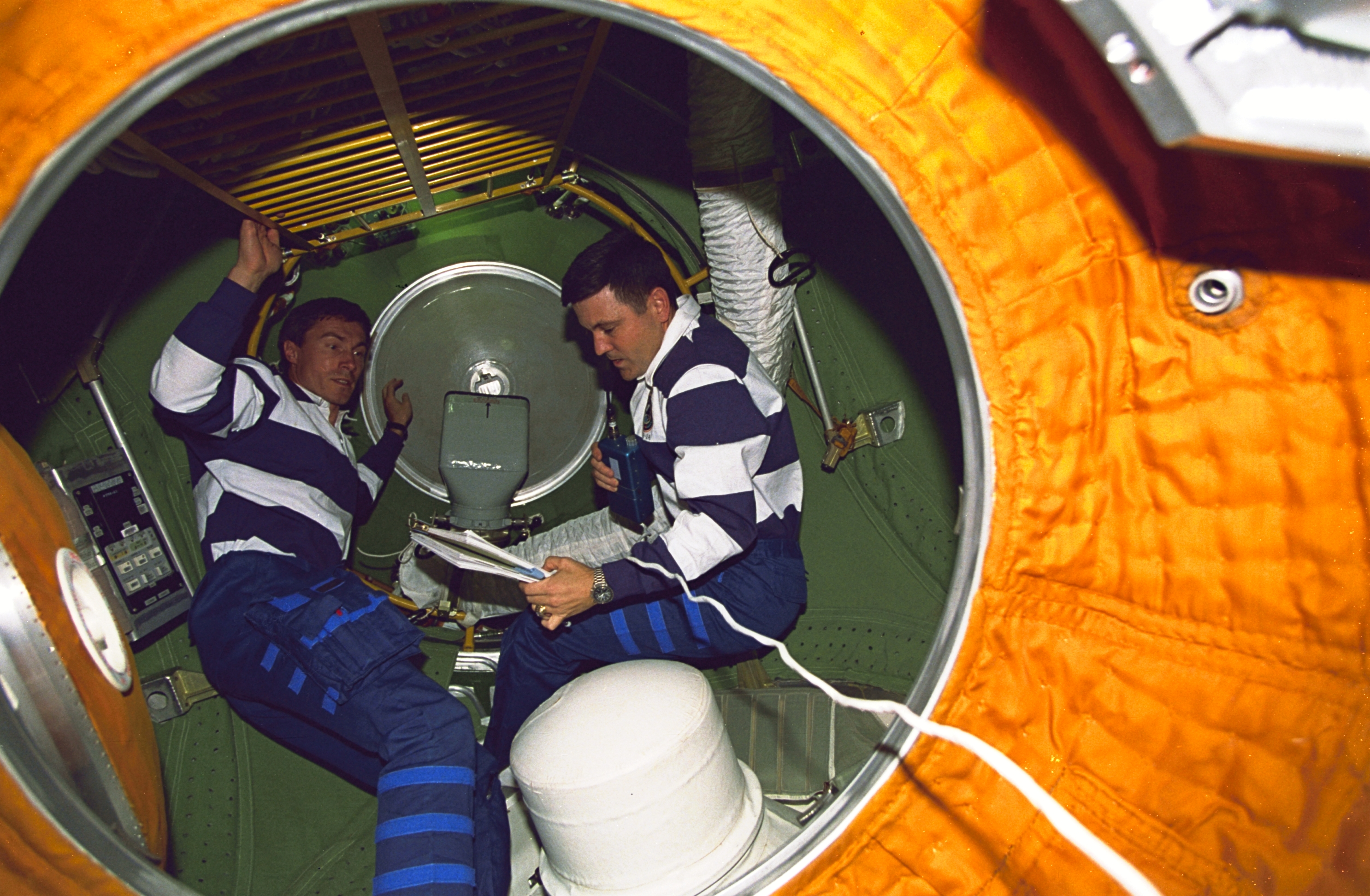
Sergei Krikalev and Robert Cabana enter in Zarya in December 1998

Zarya was launched on 20 November 1998 atop a Russian Proton-K rocket from Baikonur Cosmodrome Site 81 in Kazakhstan, into a 400-kilometer (250 mi) orbit, with a planned operational lifetime of at least 15 years.

The first U.S. contribution to the ISS, the Unity module, followed on 4 December 1998 aboard STS-88. During the mission, Commander Robert Cabana maneuvered the Space Shuttle Endeavour to within 10 meters (33 ft) of Zarya, enabling Mission Specialist Nancy Currie to capture the module with the Shuttle's robotic arm and attach its forward port to Pressurized Mating Adapter-1, which was already mounted on the aft end of Unity. Astronauts Jerry Ross and James Newman then conducted two spacewalks to connect electrical and data cables between the two modules. On 10 December 1998, Cabana and Russian cosmonaut Sergei Krikalev ceremonially entered the new orbital outpost for the first time.

The crew of STS-88 departed on 13 December 1998, leaving Zarya to autonomously manage the station’s power, propulsion, and guidance, a role it was originally intended to perform for only six to eight months. However, the station would remain unoccupied for nearly two years due to delays with the Russian service module, Zvezda. Before the arrival of Zvezda, the station was visited twice by the Space Shuttle for short-duration outfitting and reboost missions: STS-96 in May 1999 and STS-101 in May 2000. Zvezda was launched on 12 July 2000 and, on 26 July, automatically docked its forward port to the aft port of Zarya.

== Dockings ==
Spacecraft	Launch (UTC)	Launch vehicle	Launch pad	Docking	Undocking	Deorbit	Remarks
Forward (via PMA-1)
Unity	4 December 1998; 08:35:34	Space Shuttle; Endeavour	Kennedy Space Center; LC-39A	7 December 1998; 02:07	—N/a		Launched on STS-88. Docking performed by Canadarm remote manipulator system on Endeavour.
Nadir
Progress M1-4	16 November 2000; 01:32:36	Soyuz-U	Baikonur Cosmodrome; Site 1/5	18 November 2000; 03:48	1 December 2000; 16:23	8 February 2001; 13:50	ISS-2P. The automatic Kurs docking system failed, and the manual backup, TORU, was used for the docking. Following undocking, Progress M1-4 spent 25 days in free flight, prior to redocking with the same port.
Progress M1-4	16 November 2000; 01:32:36	Soyuz-U	Baikonur Cosmodrome; Site 1/5	26 December 2000; 10:54	8 February 2001; 11:26	8 February 2001; 13:50	ISS-2P. The automatic Kurs docking system failed, and the manual backup, TORU, was used for the docking. Following undocking, Progress M1-4 spent 25 days in free flight, prior to redocking with the same port.
Soyuz TM-31	31 October 2000; 07:52:47	Soyuz-U	Baikonur Cosmodrome; Site 1/5	24 February 2001; 10:37	18 April 2001; 12:40	6 May 2001; 05:41:28	ISS-2R. Had been docked to Zvedza since 2 November 2000 after delivering Expedition 1 and translated back to Zvedza after undocking.
Soyuz TM-32	28 April 2001; 07:37:20	Soyuz-U	Baikonur Cosmodrome; Site 1/5	30 April 2001; 07:58	19 October 2001; 10:48	31 October 2001; 05:00:00	ISS-2S carrying short-stay mission ISS EP-1. Crew returned in Soyuz TM-31 and capsule served as lifeboat for Expedition 2 and Expedition 3. Translated to Pirs after undocking.
Soyuz TM-33	21 October 2001; 08:59:35	Soyuz-U	Baikonur Cosmodrome; Site 1/5	23 October 2001; 10:44	20 April 2002; 09:16	5 May 2002; 03:51:53	ISS-3S. Crew returned in Soyuz TM-32 and capsule served as lifeboat for Expedition 3 and Expedition 4. Translated to Pirs after undocking.
Soyuz TM-34	25 April 2002; 06:28:35	Soyuz-U	Baikonur Cosmodrome; Site 1/5	27 April 2002; 07:55	9 November 2002; 20:44	10 November 2002; 00:04:20	ISS-4S. Crew returned in Soyuz TM-33 and capsule served as lifeboat for Expedition 4 and Expedition 5. Capsule returned with crew from Soyuz TMA-1. Final crewed launch on Soyuz-U booster and final flight of Soyuz TM capsule.
Soyuz TMA-2	26 April 2003; 03:53:52	Soyuz-FG	Baikonur Cosmodrome; Site 1/5	28 April 2003; 05:56	27 October 2003; 23:17	28 October 2003; 02:40:20	ISS-6S delivering Expedition 7. First Soyuz mission performing crew exchange after the Space Shuttle Columbia disaster. Returned with additional visiting crew member launched on Soyuz TMA-3.
Soyuz TMA-4	19 April 2004; 03:19:00	Soyuz-FG	Baikonur Cosmodrome; Site 1/5	21 April 2004; 05:01	23 October 2004; 21:08	24 October 2004; 00:35:00	ISS-8S delivering Expedition 9. Visiting crew member returned with Expedition 8 on Soyuz TMA-3. Returned with visiting crew member launched on Soyuz TMA-5.
Soyuz TMA-5	14 October 2004; 03:06	Soyuz-FG	Baikonur Cosmodrome; Site 1/5	29 November 2004; 09:53	24 April 2005; 18:44	24 April 2005; 22:08	ISS-9S. Had been docked to Pirs since 16 October 2004 after delivering Expedition 10. Returned with visiting crew member launched on Soyuz TMA-6.
Soyuz TMA-6	15 April 2005; 00:46:25	Soyuz-FG	Baikonur Cosmodrome; Site 1/5	19 July 2005; 11:08	10 October 2005; 21:49	11 October 2005; 01:09:00	ISS-10S. Had been docked to Pirs since 17 April 2005 after delivering Expedition 11. Returned with visiting crew member launched on Soyuz TMA-7.
Soyuz TMA-7	1 October 2005; 03:55:00	Soyuz-FG	Baikonur Cosmodrome; Site 1/5	18 November 2005; 09:05	20 March 2006; 06:49	8 April 2006; 23:48:00	ISS-11S. Had been docked to Pirs since 3 October 2005 after delivering Expedition 12. Translated to Zvedza after undocking.
Soyuz TMA-8	30 March 2006; 02:30	Soyuz-FG	Baikonur Cosmodrome; Site 1/5	1 April 2006; 04:19	28 September 2006; 21:53	29 September 2006; 01:13	ISS-12S delivering Expedition 13. Visiting crew member returned with Expedition 12 on Soyuz TMA-7. Returned with visiting crew member launched on Soyuz TMA-9.
Soyuz TMA-9	18 September 2006; 04:08	Soyuz-FG	Baikonur Cosmodrome; Site 1/5	10 October 2006; 19:34	29 March 2007; 23:30	21 April 2007; 12:31	ISS-13S. Had been docked to Zvedza since 20 September 2006 after delivering Expedition 14. Translated back to Zvedza after undocking.
Soyuz TMA-10	7 April 2007; 17:31:09	Soyuz-FG	Baikonur Cosmodrome; Site 1/5	9 April 2007; 19:10	27 September 2007; 20:20	21 October 2007; 10:36	ISS-14S delivering Expedition 15. Visiting crew member returned with Expedition 14 on Soyuz TMA-9. Translated to Zvedza after undocking.
Soyuz TMA-11	10 October 2007; 13:22:29	Soyuz-FG	Baikonur Cosmodrome; Site 1/5	12 October 2007; 14:50	19 April 2008; 05:06	19 April 2008; 08:30	ISS-15S delivering Expedition 16. Visiting crew member returned with Expedition 15 on Soyuz TMA-10. Returned with visiting crew member launched on Soyuz TMA-12.
Progress M-64	14 May 2008; 20:22:56	Soyuz-U	Baikonur Cosmodrome; Site 1/5	16 May 2008; 21:39	1 September 2008; 19:46	8 September 2008; 21:33	ISS-29P
Soyuz TMA-13	12 October 2008; 07:01	Soyuz-FG	Baikonur Cosmodrome; Site 1/5	14 October 2008; 08:26	8 April 2009; 03:55	8 April 2009; 07:16	ISS-17S delivering Expedition 18. Visiting crew member returned with Expedition 17 on Soyuz TMA-12. Returned with visiting crew member launched on Soyuz TMA-14.
Soyuz TMA-15	27 May 2009; 10:34:53	Soyuz-FG	Baikonur Cosmodrome; Site 1/5	29 May 2009; 12:34	1 December 2009; 03:56	1 December 2009; 07:17	ISS-19S delivering Expedition 20.
Soyuz TMA-17	20 December 2009; 21:52	Soyuz-FG	Baikonur Cosmodrome; Site 1/5	22 December 2009; 22:48	12 May 2010; 13:26	2 June 2010; 03:25	ISS-21S delivering Expedition 22. Translated to Zvedza after undocking.
Rassvet	14 May 2010; 18:20	Space Shuttle; Atlantis	Kennedy Space Center; LC-39A	18 May 2010; 12:20	—N/a		Launched on STS-132. Docking performed by ISS Mobile Servicing System.
Aft
Zvedza	12 July 2000; 04:56	Proton-K	Baikonur Cosmodrome; Site 81/23	26 July 2000; 01:45	—N/a		ISS-1R

== Gallery ==
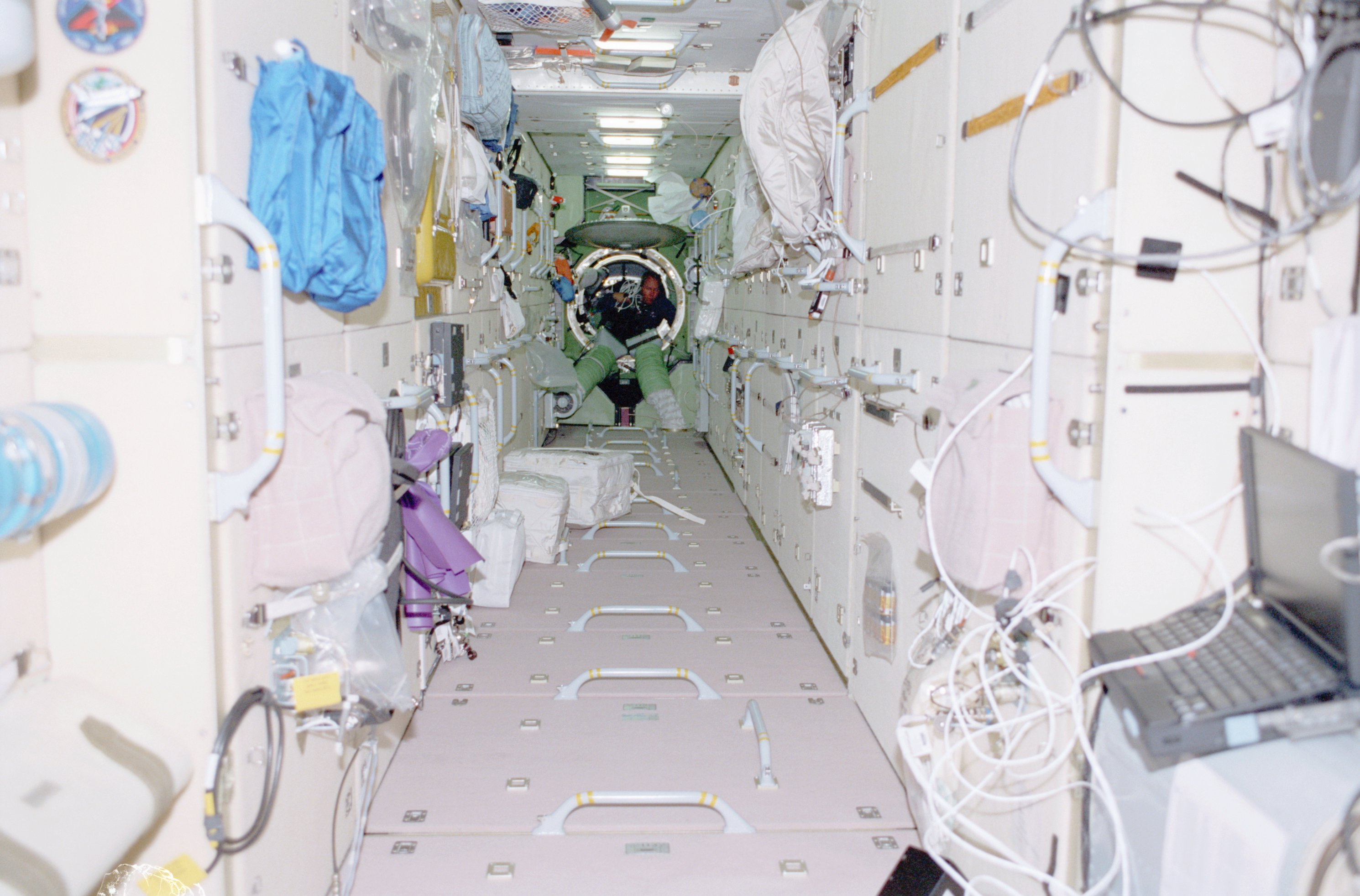
Interior of Zarya

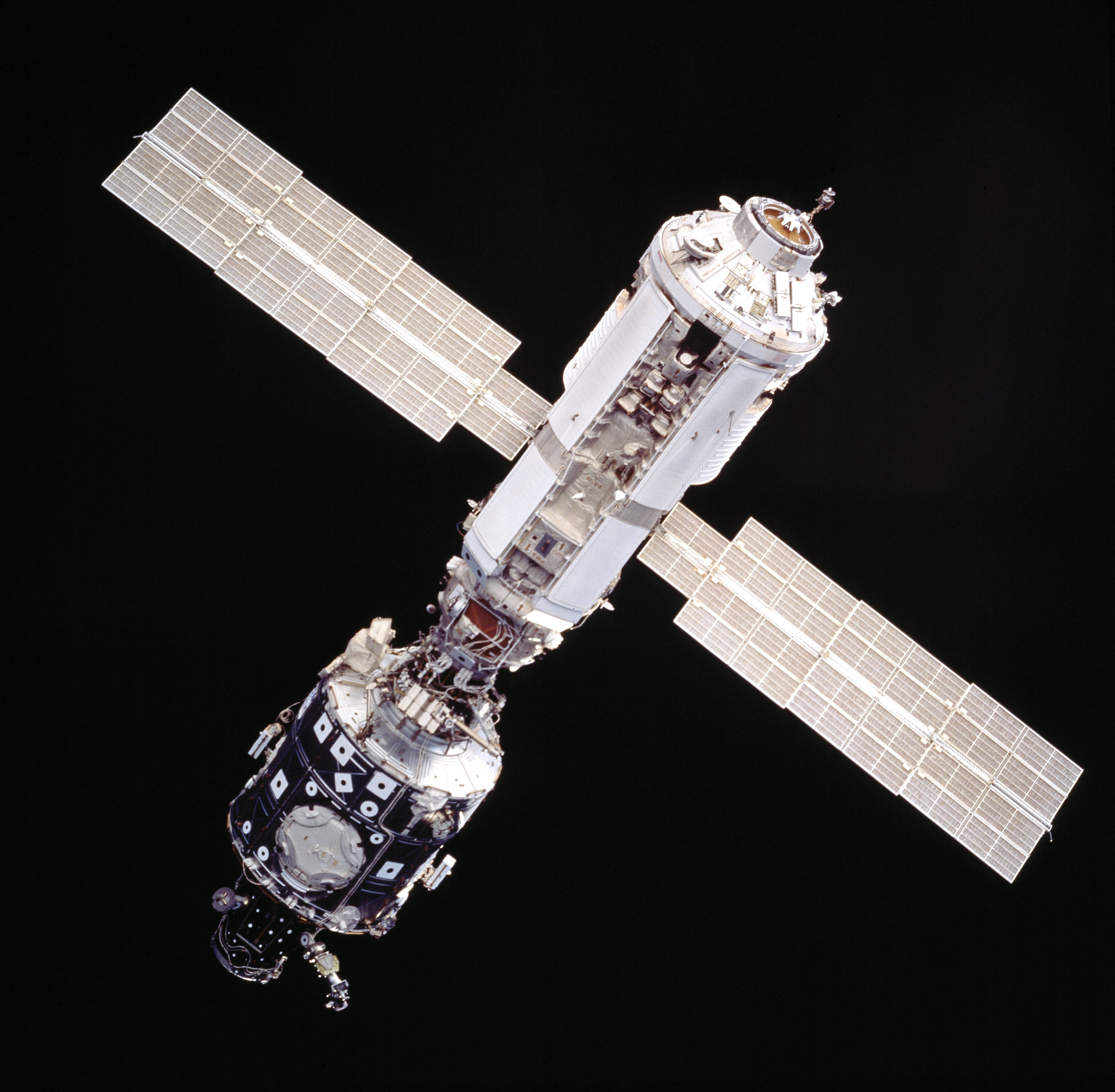
Zarya (top) and Unity (Node 1)

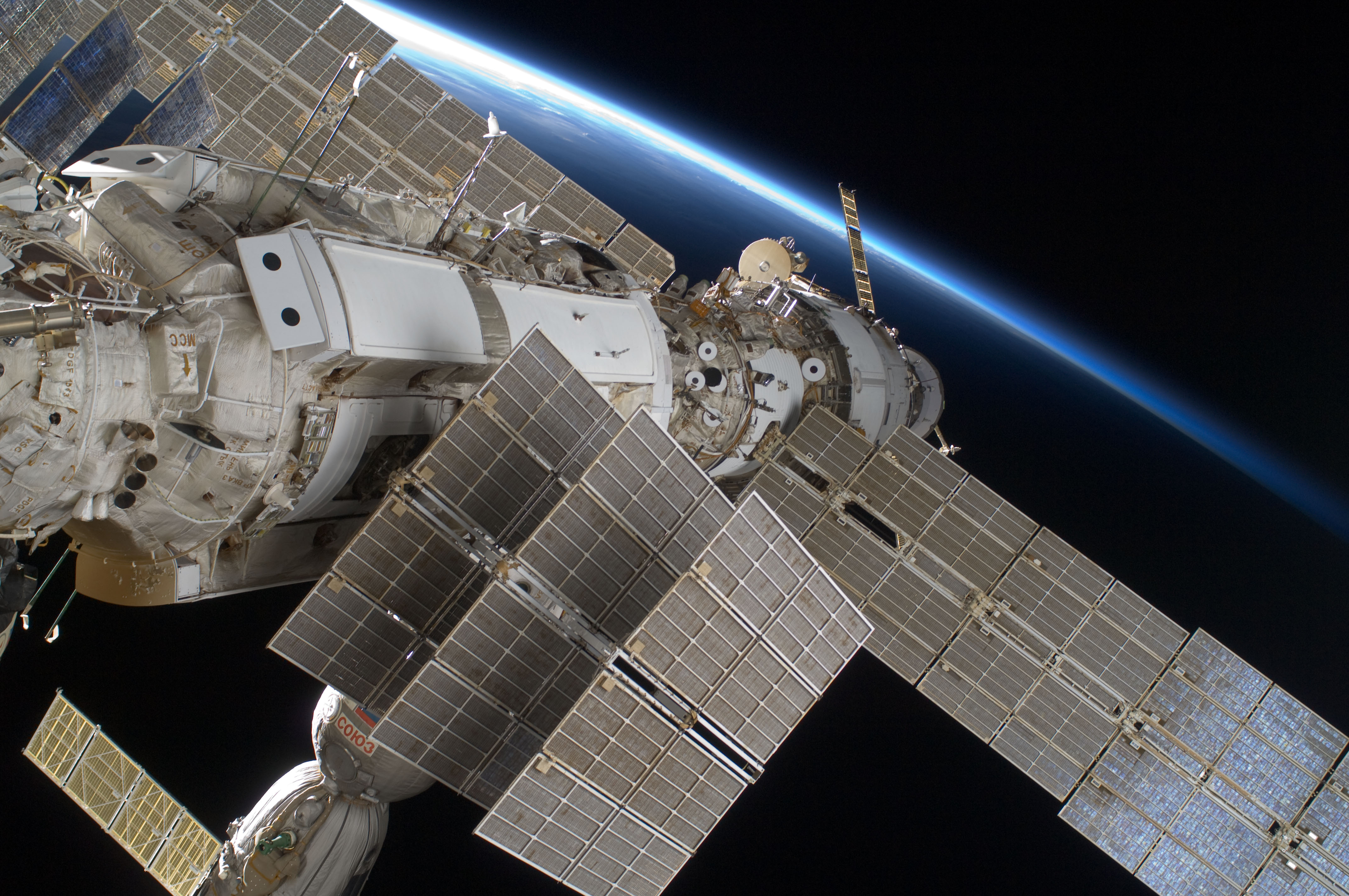
Zarya as seen in 2009 during STS-128, solar arrays folded

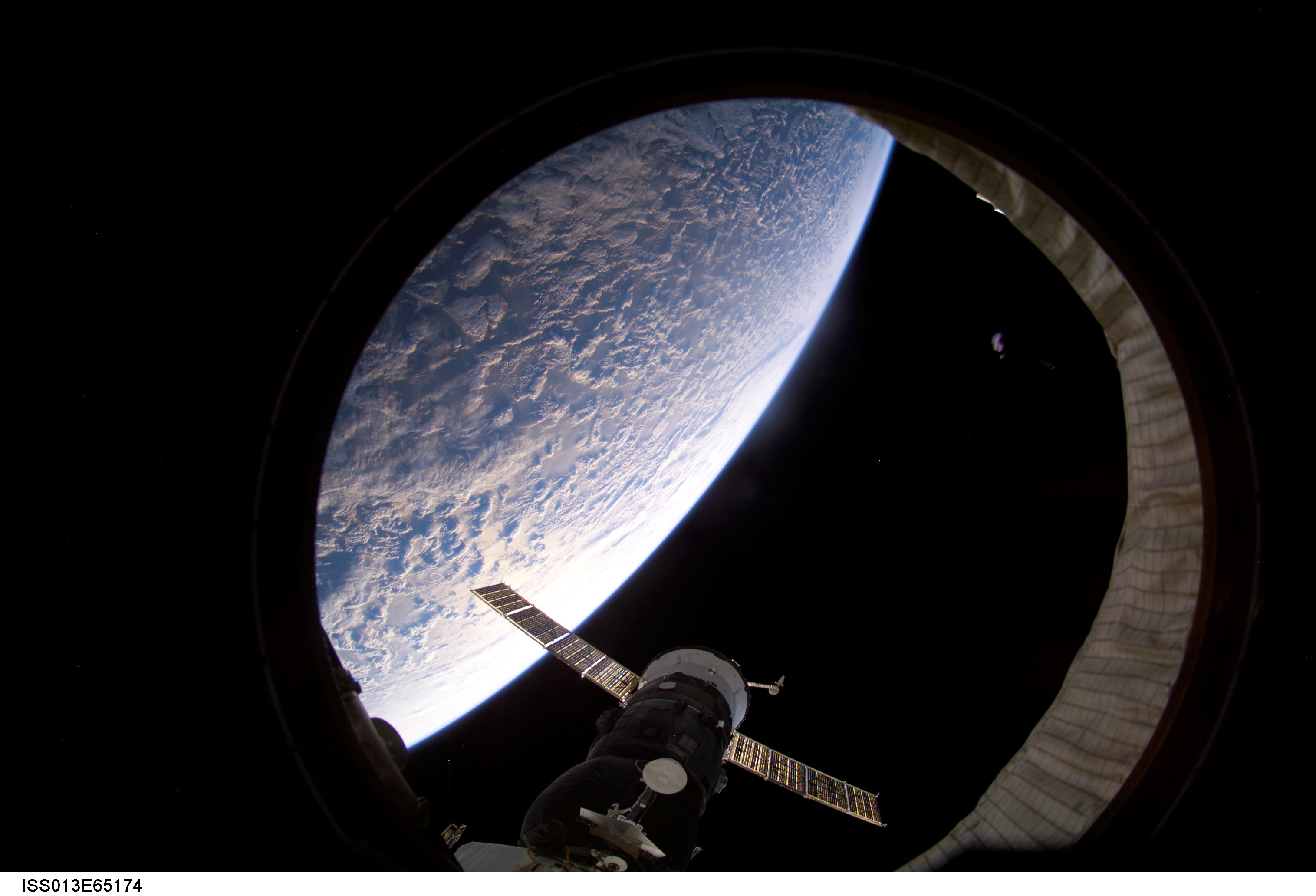
View through the window of Zarya, 2006

== See also ==
- Power and Propulsion Element station module of the Lunar Gateway
