= Konstantin Kozeyev =

Russian cosmonaut (born 1967)

- Константин Козеев
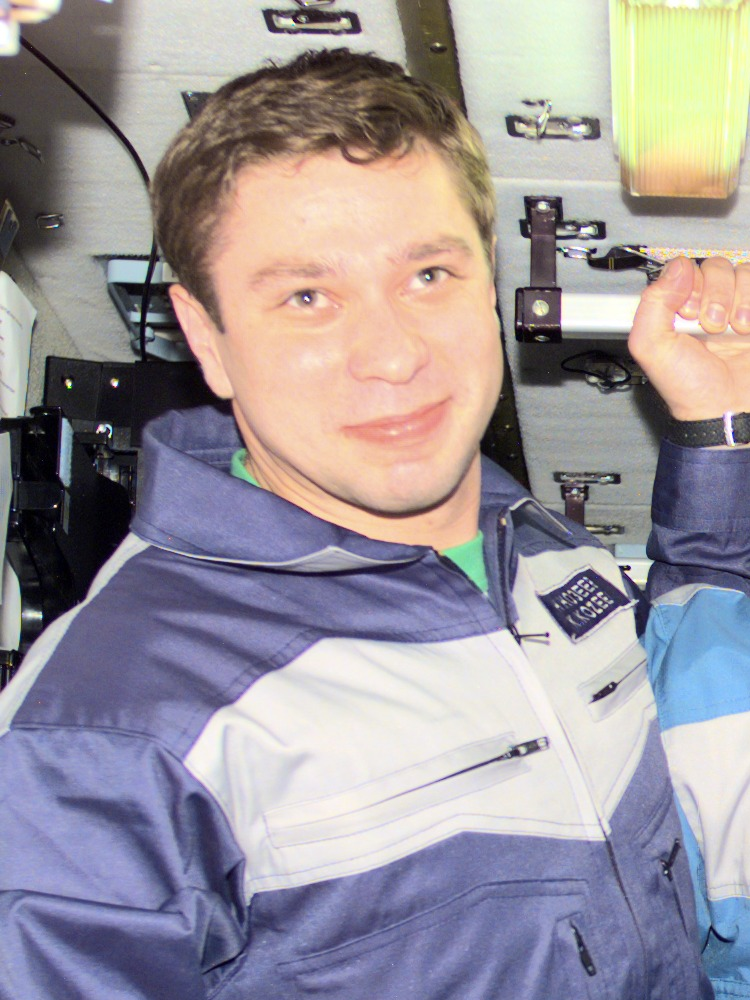
- Born: December 1, 1967 (age 58); Korolyov, Moscow Oblast, Russian SFSR, Soviet Union
- Occupation: Flight engineer
- Awards: Hero of the Russian Federation
- Space career

RKA Cosmonaut
- Status: Retired
- Time in space: 9d 19h 59min
- Selection: 1996 RKKE Cosmonaut Group
- Missions: Soyuz TM-33/TM-32
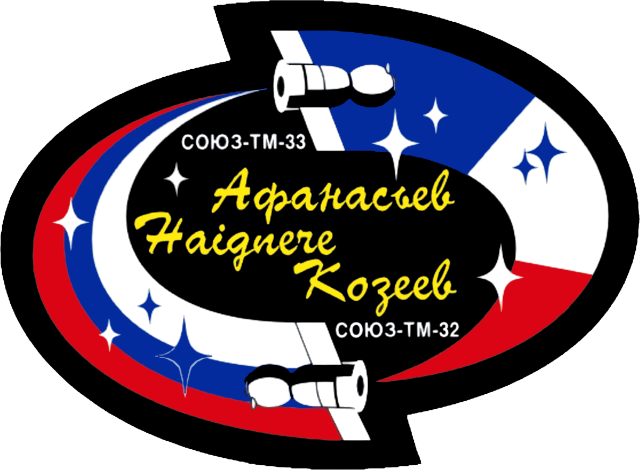
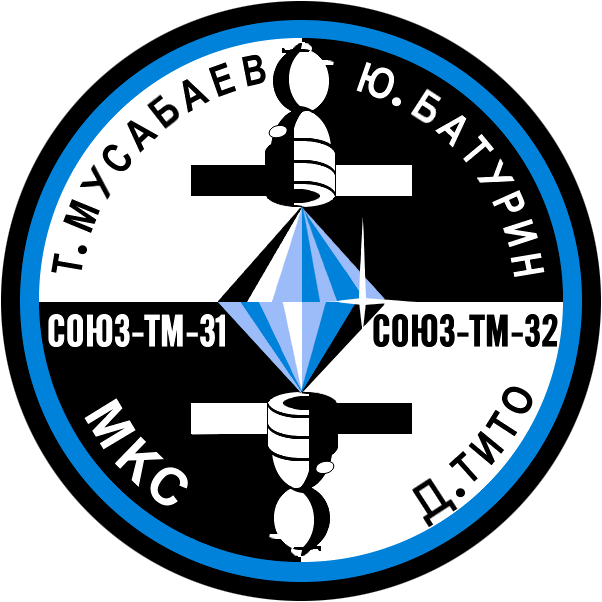
- Mission insignia

Konstantin Mirovich Kozeyev (Russian: Константин Мирович Козеев) is a retired Russian cosmonaut.

== Early life and career ==
Kozeyev was born in Korolyov, Moscow Oblast, Russian SFSR on December 1, 1967. He is a graduate student from Moscow Aviation Technology Institute and was selected as a cosmonaut on February 9, 1996. He flew as Flight Engineer on Soyuz TM-33 in 2001.

== Personal life ==
Kozeyev is divorced and has no children.
