= Progress M-64 =

Progress spacecraft used to resupply the International Space Station

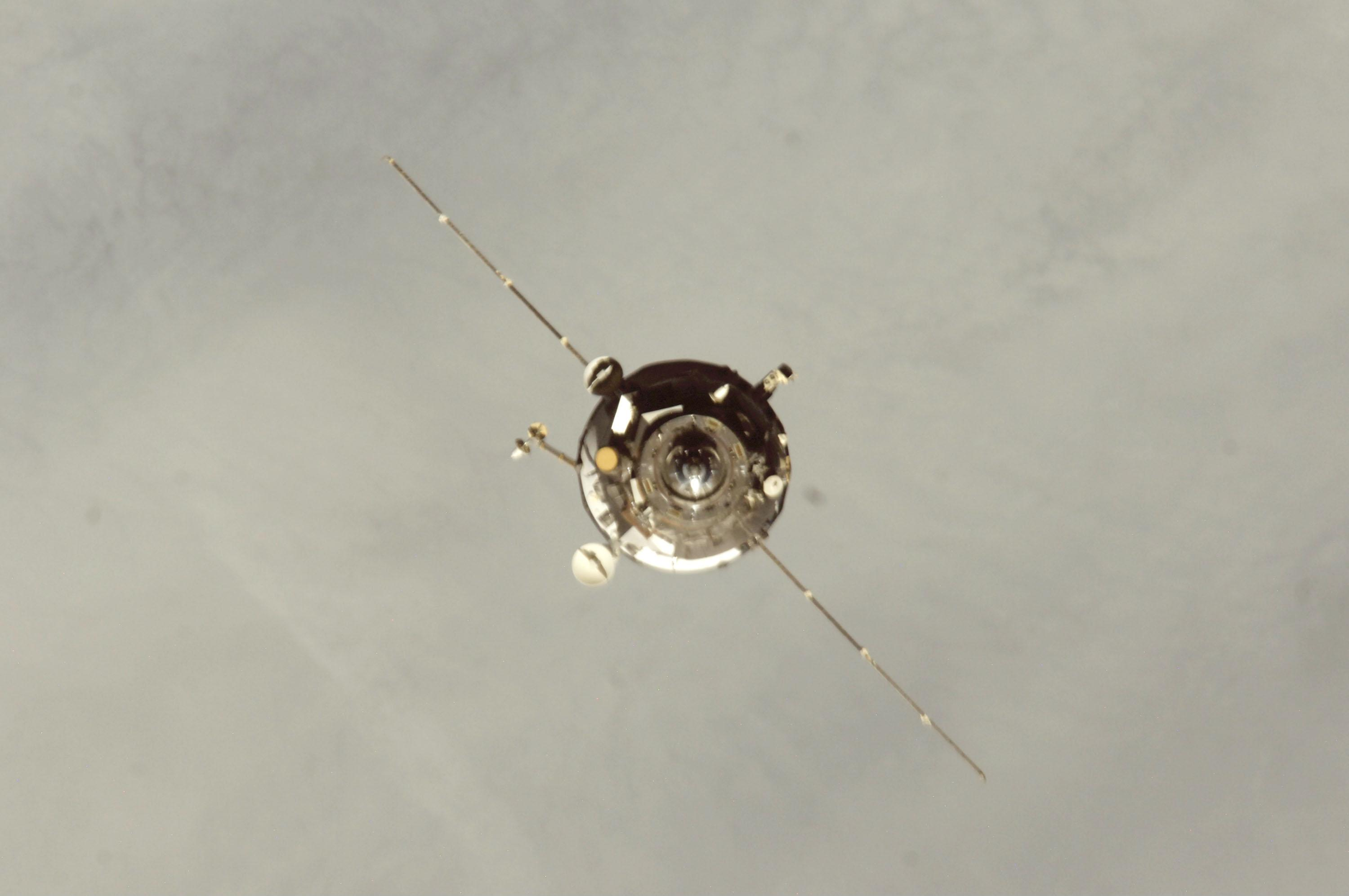
- Progress M-64 after undocking from Zarya.
- Mission type: ISS resupply
- Operator: Roskosmos
- COSPAR ID: 2008-023A
- SATCAT no.: 32847
- Mission duration: 117 days

Spacecraft properties
- Spacecraft type: Progress-M s/n 364
- Manufacturer: RKK Energia
- Launch mass: 7056 kg

Start of mission
- Launch date: 14 May 2008, 20:22 UTC
- Rocket: Soyuz-U
- Launch site: Baikonur, Site 1/5

End of mission
- Disposal: Deorbited
- Decay date: 8 September 2008, 21:33 UTC

Orbital parameters
- Reference system: Geocentric
- Regime: Low Earth
- Perigee altitude: 337 km
- Apogee altitude: 344 km
- Inclination: 51.6°
- Period: 91.3 minutes
- Epoch: 14 May 2008

Docking with ISS
- Docking port: Zarya nadir
- Docking date: 16 May 2008, 21:39:20 UTC
- Undocking date: 1 September 2008, 19:46 UTC
- Time docked: 108 days

Cargo
- Mass: 3100 kg
- Pressurised: 1292 kg (dry cargo)
- Fuel: 1230 kg
- Gaseous: 29 kg (oxygen) and 21 kg (air)
- Water: 420 kg
- Progress ISS Resupply

Progress M-64 (Russian: Прогресс М-64), identified by NASA as Progress 29P, was a Progress spacecraft used to resupply the International Space Station. It was a Progress-M 11F615A55 spacecraft, with the serial number 364.

== Launch ==
Progress M-64 was launched by a Soyuz-U carrier rocket from Site 1/5 at the Baikonur Cosmodrome. Launch occurred at 20:22 UTC on 14 May 2008.

== Docking ==
The spacecraft docked with the nadir port of the Zarya module at 21:39:20 UTC on 16 May 2008, two minutes behind schedule, by means of the Kurs system. Following undocking at 19:46 UTC on 1 September 2008, it spent a week in free-flight conducting experiments for the Plazma-Progress programme. It was deorbited on 8 September 2008, with the deorbit burn beginning at 20:47 UTC. The spacecraft burned up in the atmosphere over the Pacific Ocean, with any remaining debris landing in the ocean at around 21:33 UTC.

== Cargo ==
Progress M-64 carried 3,100 kilograms (6,800 lb) of cargo to the International Space Station. 1,292 kilograms (2,848 lb) of this was dry cargo, including food for the crew, equipment for conducting scientific research, and a replacement Sokol KV-2 spacesuit for Sergey Volkov, as his original suit had been damaged. It also carried a docking target for attaching the MRM-2 module to the zenith port of the Zvezda module.

In addition to dry cargo, it carried 1,230 kilograms (2,710 lb) of fuel for reboosting and refuelling the ISS, 29 kilograms (64 lb) of oxygen and 21 kilograms (46 lb) of air for the crew to breathe, and 420 kilograms (930 lb) of water.

== See also ==
- List of Progress flights
- Uncrewed spaceflights to the International Space Station
