= Soyuz TM-32 =

2001 Russian crewed spaceflight to the ISS

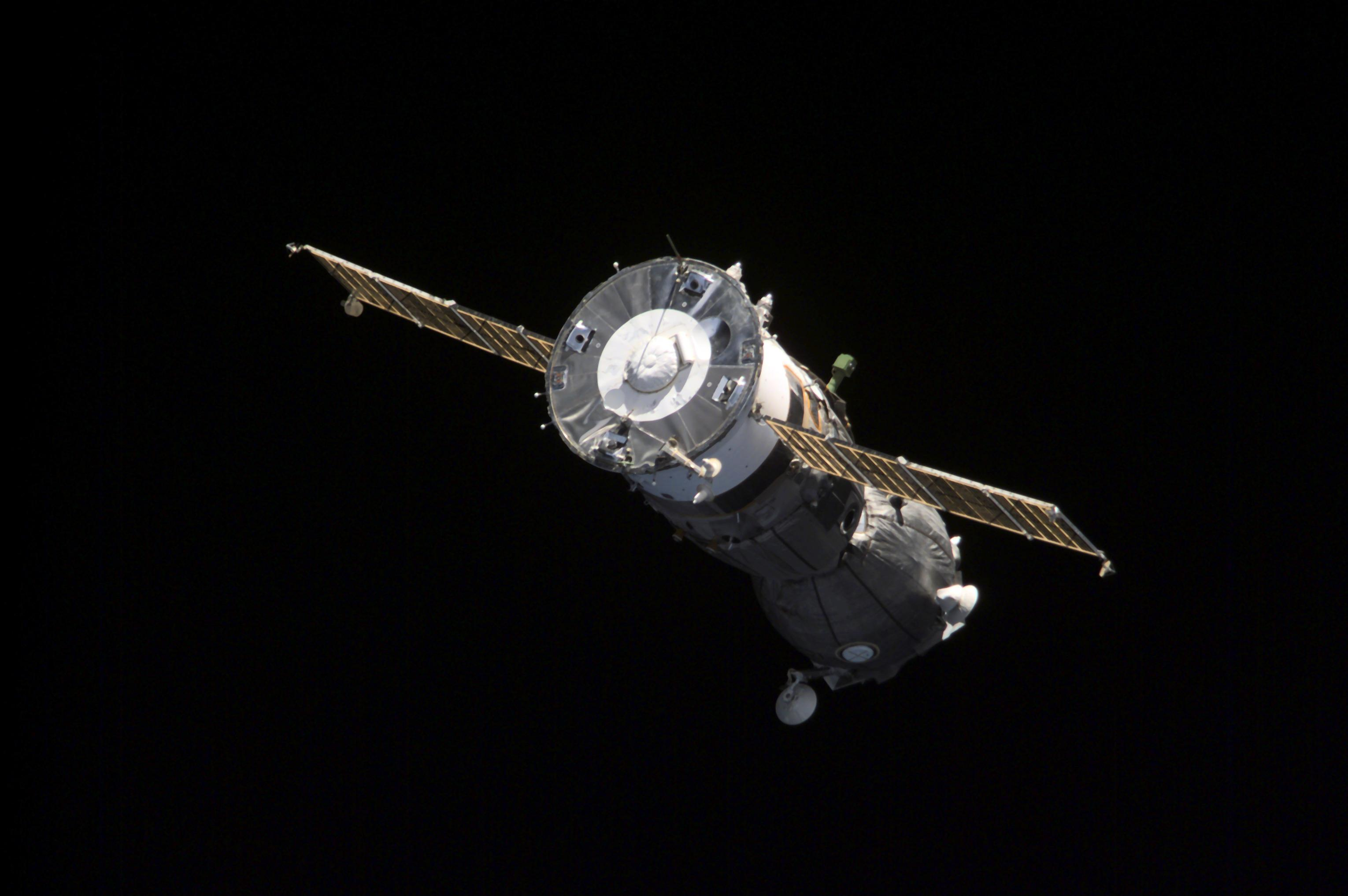
- TM-32 undocks on October 31st, 2001
- Operator: Rosaviakosmos
- COSPAR ID: 2001-017A
- SATCAT no.: 26749
- Mission duration: 185 days, 21 hours, 22 minutes, 40 seconds
- Orbits completed: ~3,025

Spacecraft properties
- Spacecraft type: Soyuz-TM
- Manufacturer: RKK Energia

Crew
- Crew size: 3
- Launching: Talgat Musabayev; Yuri Baturin; Dennis Tito
- Landing: Viktor M. Afanasyev; Claudie Haigneré; Konstantin Kozeyev
- Callsign: Криста́лл (Kristall)

Start of mission
- Launch date: April 28, 2001, 07:37:20 UTC
- Rocket: Soyuz-U

End of mission
- Landing date: October 31, 2001, 05:00:00 UTC
- Landing site: Near Arkalyk; 46°44′58″N 69°42′58″E

Orbital parameters
- Reference system: Geocentric
- Regime: Low Earth
- Perigee altitude: 193 kilometres (120 mi)
- Apogee altitude: 247 kilometres (153 mi)
- Inclination: 51.6 degrees
- Period: 88.6 minutes

Docking with ISS
- Docking port: Zarya nadir
- Docking date: 30 April 2001; 07:58 UTC
- Undocking date: 19 October 2001; 10:48 UTC
- Time docked: 172d 2h 50m

Docking with ISS (Relocation)
- Docking port: Pirs nadir
- Docking date: 19 October 2001; 11:04 UTC
- Undocking date: 31 October 2001; 01:38 UTC
- Time docked: 11d 14h 34m
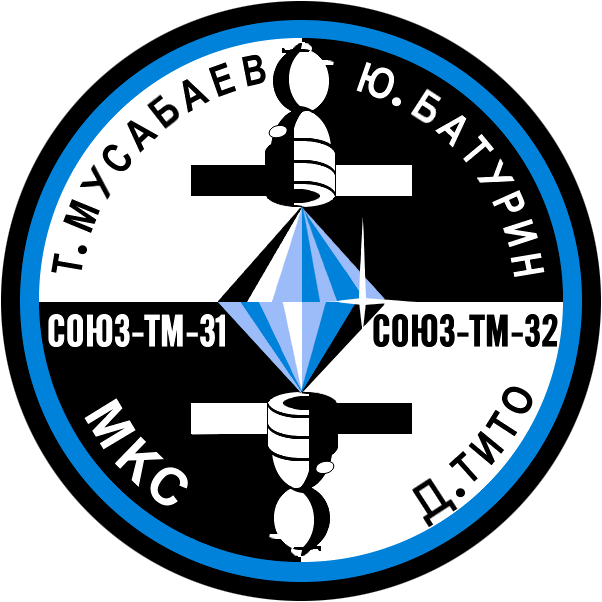
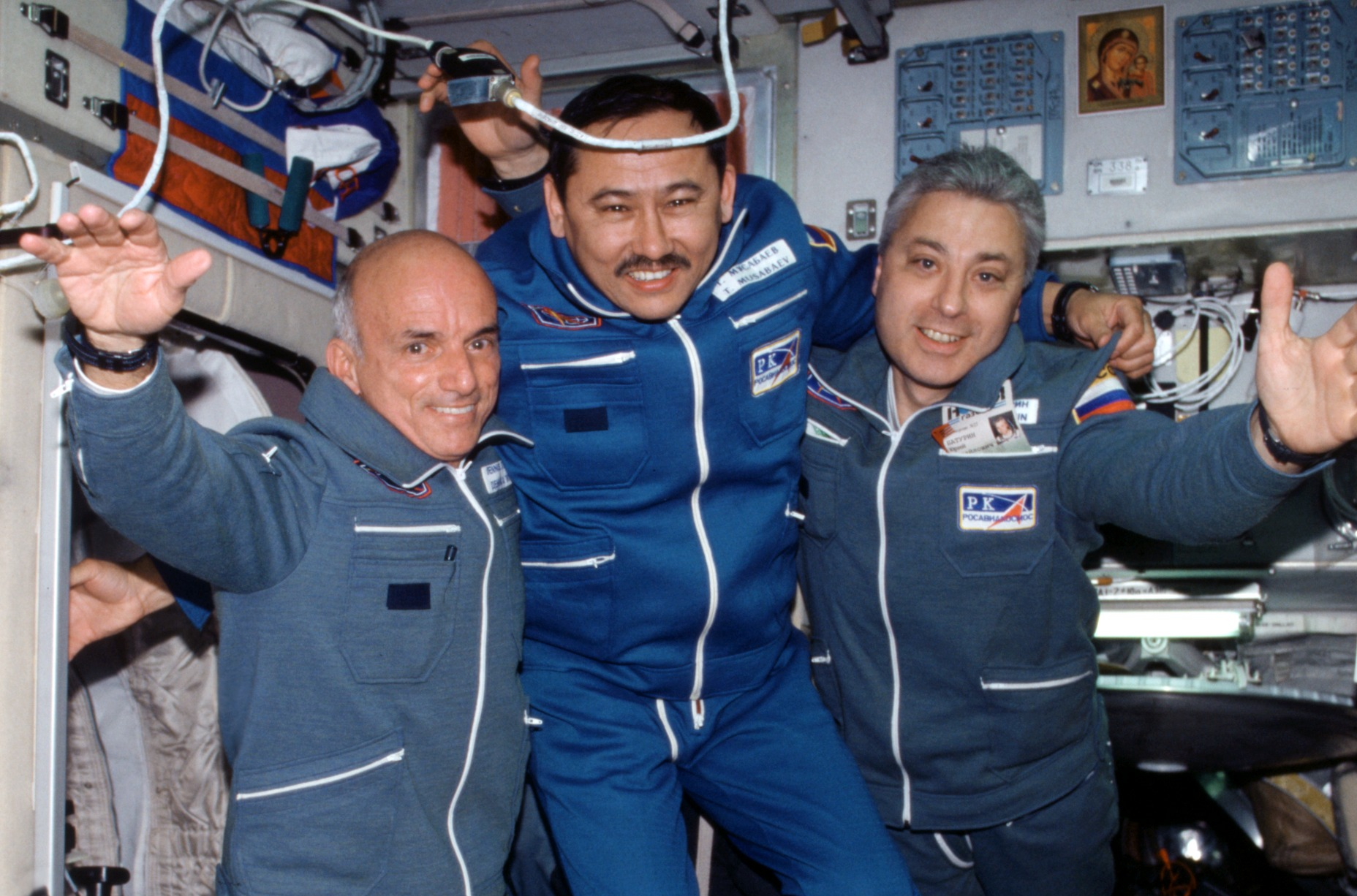
- Soyuz TM-32 Taxi crewmembers in the Zvezda Service Module Soyuz programme (Crewed missions)

Soyuz TM-32 was a crewed Soyuz spaceflight which was launched on April 28, 2001, and docked with the International Space Station two days later. It launched the crew of the visiting mission ISS EP-1, which included the first paying space tourist Dennis Tito, as well as two Russian cosmonauts. The Soyuz TM-32 remained docked to the station until October; during this time it served as the lifeboat for the crew of Expedition 2 and later for the crew of Expedition 3. In October it landed the crew of ISS EP-2, who had been launched by Soyuz TM-33.

== Crew ==
Position	Launching crew	Landing crew
Commander	(Kazakhstan) Talgat Musabayev, RKA; Third and last spaceflight	(Russia) Viktor M. Afanasyev, RKA; Fourth and last spaceflight
Flight Engineer	(Russia) Yuri Baturin, RKA; Second and last spaceflight	(France) Claudie Haigneré, ESA; Second and last spaceflight
Spaceflight Participant/Flight Engineer	(United States) Dennis Tito, SA; Only spaceflight Tourist	(Russia) Konstantin Kozeyev, RKA; Only spaceflight

== Docking with ISS ==
- Docked to ISS: April 30, 2001, 07:58 UTC (to nadir port of Zarya)
- Undocked from ISS: October 19, 2001, 10:48 UTC (from nadir port of Zarya)
- Docked to ISS: October 19, 2001, 11:04 UTC (to Pirs module)
- Undocked from ISS: October 31, 2001, 01:38 UTC (from Pirs module)

== Mission highlights ==
TM-32 carried a three-man crew (two Russians and one American, the latter not a professional astronaut) to the International Space Station, ISS. It docked automatically with the ISS at 07:57 UT on April 30, 2001, just a few hours after the space shuttle Endeavour on mission STS-100 undocked. The launched crew stayed for a week and returned in Soyuz TM-31, which had been docked to (or nearby) the station since November 2000 functioning as "lifeboat" for the onboard crew (Expedition 1 and 2).

As the new lifeboat for Expedition 2 and later Expedition 3, TM-32 stayed docked at the station for six months (except for a brief move between docking ports) and finally, on October 31, brought home two cosmonauts and an ESA astronaut who had arrived a week earlier in Soyuz TM-33.
