= Soyuz TM-24 =

1996 Russian crewed spaceflight to Mir

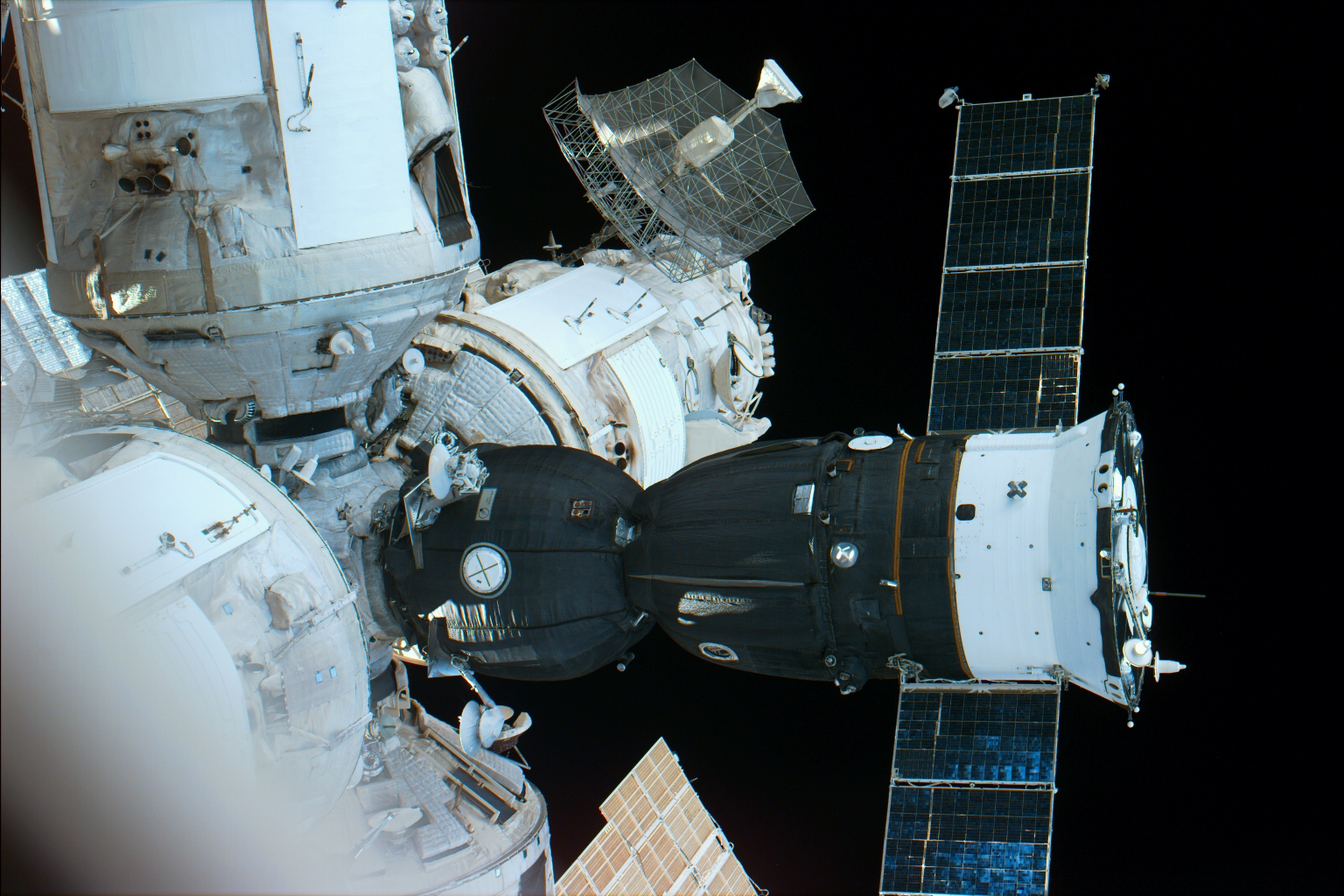
- Soyuz TM-24 docked with Mir as seen from the Space Shuttle Atlantis during STS-79.
- Operator: Rosaviakosmos
- COSPAR ID: 1996-047A
- SATCAT no.: 24280
- Mission duration: 196 days, 17 hours, 26 minutes, 13 seconds
- Orbits completed: ~3,160

Spacecraft properties
- Spacecraft: Soyuz 7K-STM No. 73
- Spacecraft type: Soyuz-TM
- Manufacturer: RKK Energia
- Launch mass: 7,150 kilograms (15,760 lb)

Crew
- Crew size: 3
- Members: Valery Korzun; Aleksandr Kaleri
- Launching: Claudie André-Deshays
- Landing: Reinhold Ewald
- Callsign: Фрега́т (Fregat - Frigate)

Start of mission
- Launch date: 17 August 1996, 13:18:03 UTC
- Rocket: Soyuz-U

End of mission
- Landing date: 2 March 1997, 06:44:16 UTC
- Landing site: 47.82°N 69.40°E

Orbital parameters
- Reference system: Geocentric
- Regime: Low Earth
- Perigee altitude: 235.1 kilometres (146.1 mi)
- Apogee altitude: 287.4 kilometres (178.6 mi)
- Inclination: 51.56 degrees

Docking with Mir
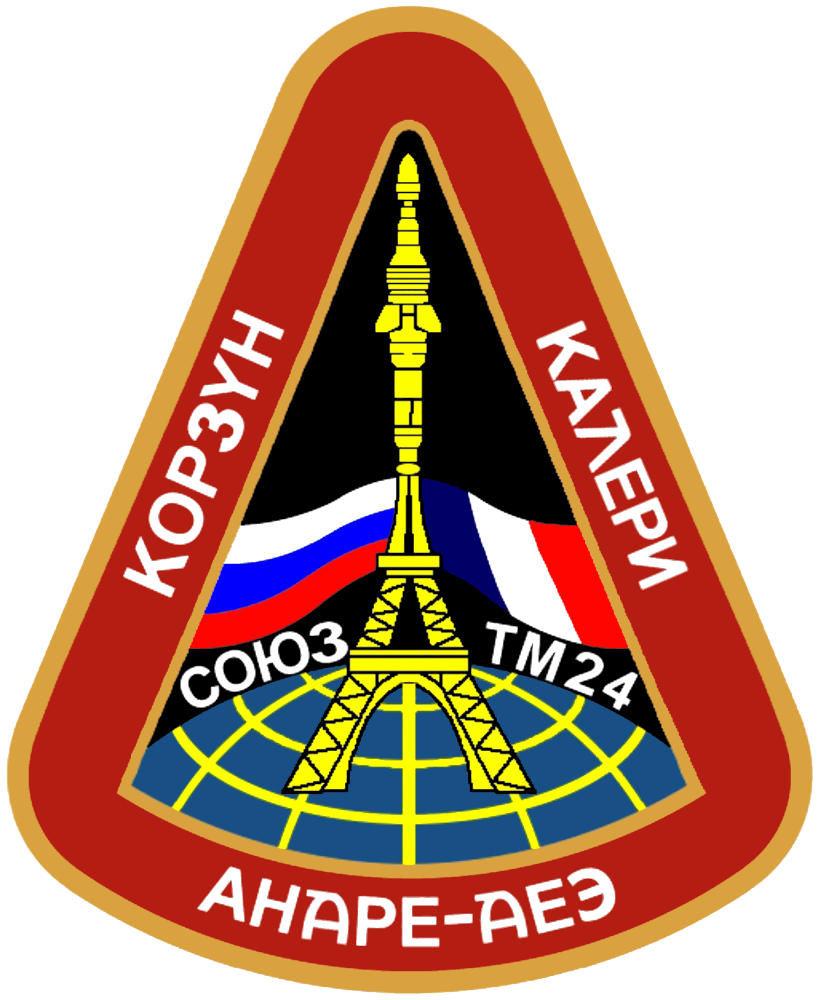
- Soyuz programme (Crewed missions)

Soyuz TM-24 was the 27th expedition to Mir. Soyuz TM-24 carried a crew of three. The crew consisted of Cosmonauts Valery Korzun and Aleksandr Kaleri, and the first French woman in space, Claudie André-Deshays. They joined American astronaut Shannon Lucid and Mir 21 crewmates Yuri Onufriyenko and Yuri Usachev. André-Deshays carried out biological and medical experiments on Mir for 16 days (the Cassiopée mission) before returning to Earth with Onufriyenko and Usachev.

== Crew ==
Position	Launching crew	Landing crew
Commander	Valery Korzun; First spaceflight	
Flight engineer	Aleksandr Kaleri; Second spaceflight	
Research cosmonaut	Claudie André-Deshays, CNES; First spaceflight	Reinhold Ewald, DLR; Only spaceflight
