= Claudie Haigneré =

French astronaut, politician and doctor (born 1957)

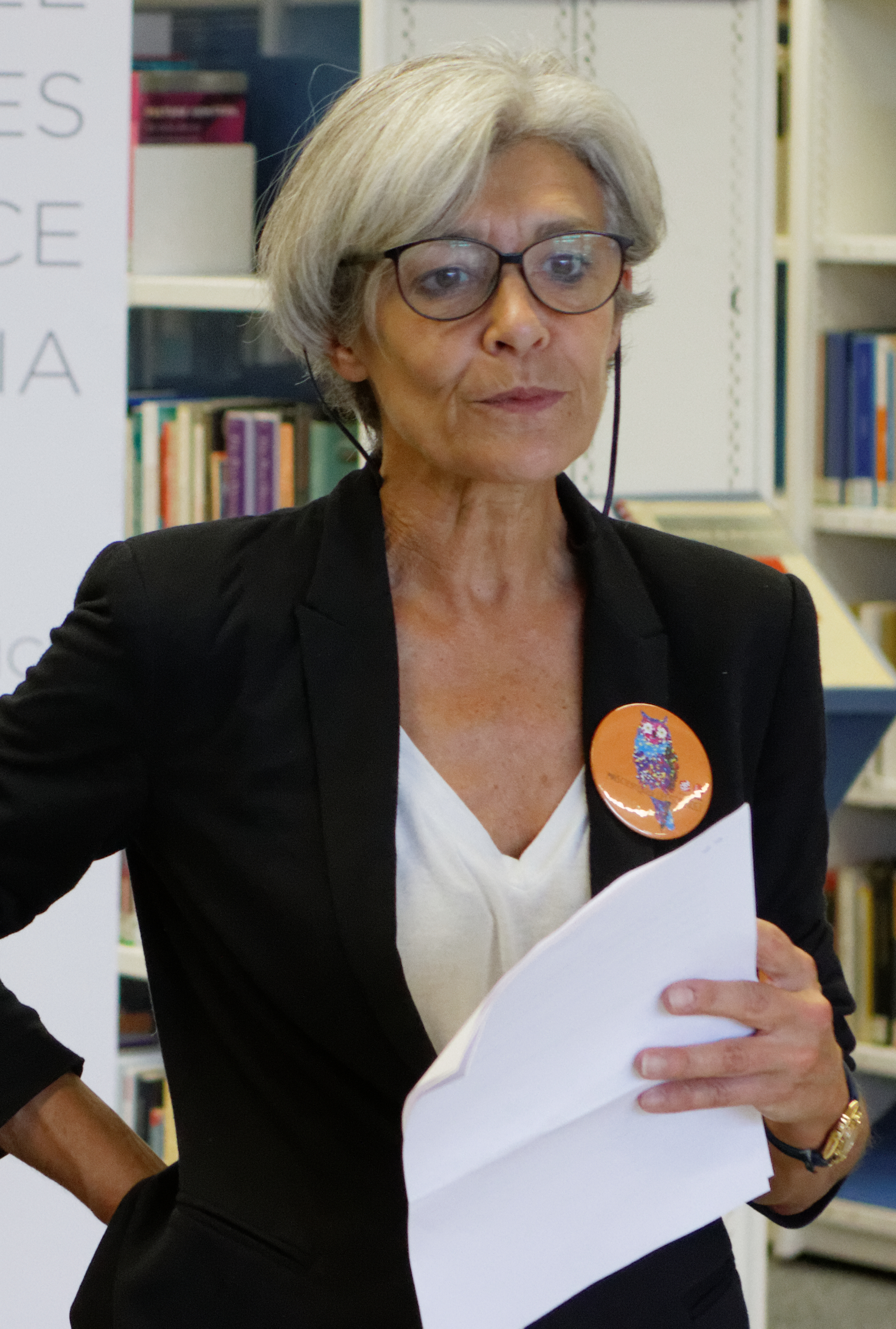
- Born: 13 May 1957 (age 69); Le Creusot, France
- Occupations: Rheumatologist; Astronaut
- Awards
- Space career

CNES/ESA astronaut
- Status: Retired
- Time in space: 25d 14h 22min
- Selection: 1985 CNES Group 2; 1999 ESA Group
- Missions: Soyuz TM-24/Soyuz TM-23 (Mir-Cassiopée), Soyuz TM-33/Soyuz TM-32 (ISS-Andromède)

Claudie Haigneré (French pronunciation: [klodi ɛɲəʁe]; née André; formerly Deshays; born 13 May 1957) is a French doctor, former politician and retired astronaut. The first female astronaut of the French Space Agency (CNES) and the European Space Agency (ESA) to go to space and to visit the ISS, she later was a government minister under Prime Minister Jean-Pierre Raffarin.

== Background and training ==
Born in Le Creusot, Claudie Haigneré studied medicine at the Faculté de Médecine (Paris-Cochin) and Faculté des Sciences (Paris-VII). In addition to her medical degree, she went on to obtain certificates in biology and sports medicine (1981), aviation medicine and space medicine (1982), and rheumatology (1984). In 1986, she received a diploma in the biomechanics and physiology of movement and received her doctorates in rheumatology (1984) and neuroscience (1992).

== Space career ==
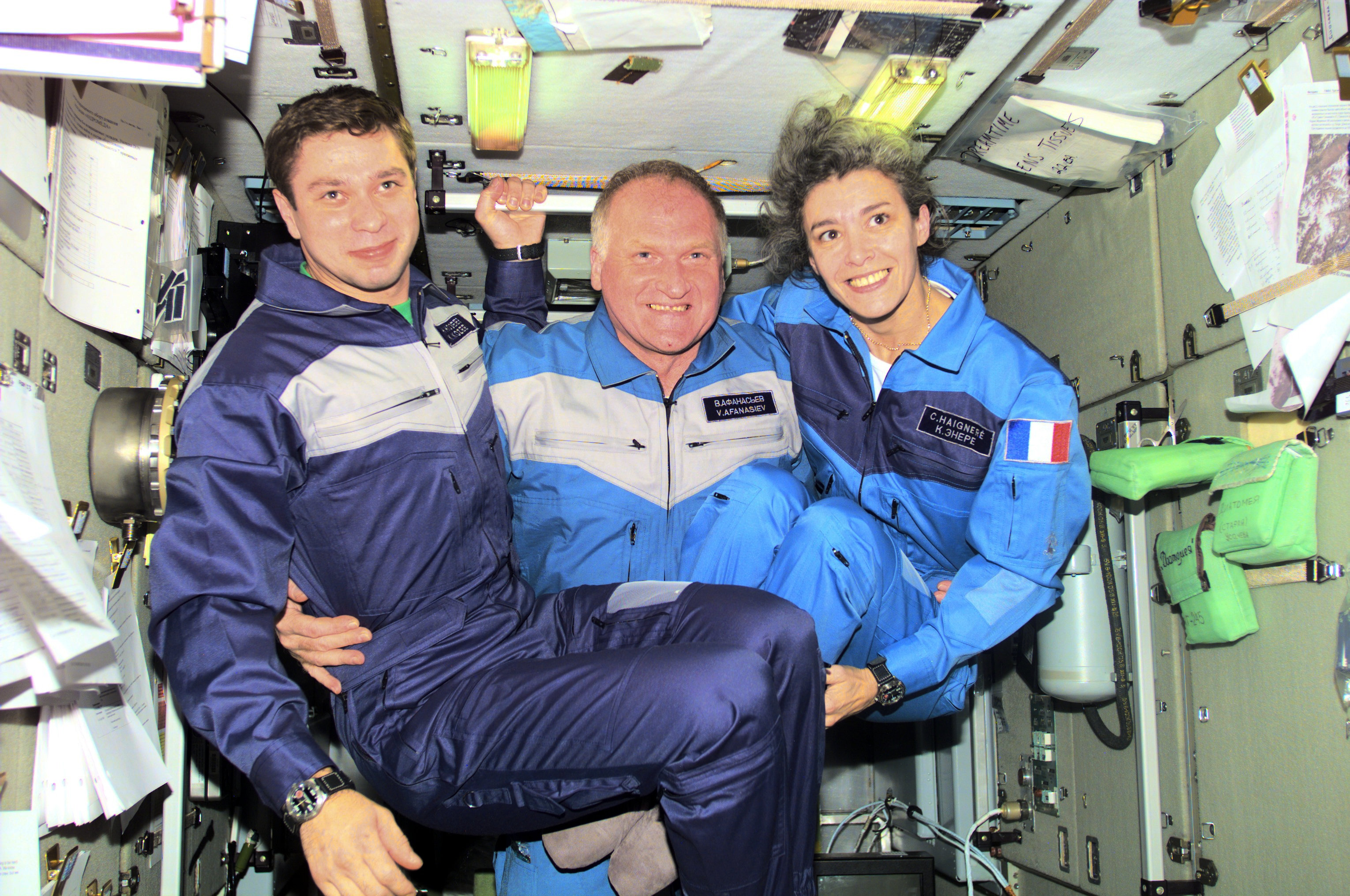
Haigneré (right) aboard the International Space Station

In 1985, France's space center selected only six men and one woman—Claudie Haigneré—to go to space. She first served as a back-up crew member for the 1993 Mir Altaïr mission, in which her future husband Jean-Pierre Haigneré participated. The asteroid 135268 Haigneré is named in their combined honour.

In 1994, Claudie Haigneré began training at the Yuri Gagarin Cosmonaut Training Center in Star City, Russia, for the Franco-Russian Cassiopeia mission and learned Russian during her time there. On 17 August 1996, she became the first French woman to go to space when she and two Russian cosmonauts, commander Valery Korzun and flight engineer Aleksandr Kaleri, launched into space aboard the Soyuz TM-24. While on the mission, Haigneré visited the Mir space station for 16 days, where she conducted comprehensive experiments in the fields of physiology and developmental biology, fluid physics and technology.

In 1999, Haigneré commanded a Soyuz capsule during reentry and became the first woman qualified to do so. As the flight engineer on Soyuz TM-33 in 2001, she became the first European woman to visit the International Space Station. After the mission, Haigneré continued her involvement in space science by attending scientific workshops and conferences. She also contributed to data analysis and constructions for the scientific programs of future projects. She eventually retired from ESA on 18 June 2002.

== Political career ==
Following her career as an astronaut, Haigneré entered French politics in Jean-Pierre Raffarin's government. She was minister delegate for Research and New Technologies from 2002 to 2004 and succeeded Noëlle Lenoir as minister delegate for European Affairs from 2004 to 2005.

== Organizational involvement ==
During her spaceflight in 1996, Haigneré agreed to a request from Dominique Baudis, mayor of Toulouse, that she be the honorary patron of the Cité de l’espace scientific discovery centre. She attended the opening of the centre with Baudis on 27 June 1997. As of January 2025, she still holds this role.

In 2009, Haigneré was named as the founding director of Universcience. Universcience brought together Europe's largest science museum, the Cité des Sciences et de l'Industrie, with the Palais de la Découverte museum. At that time, she was an advisor to the Director General of the ESA. Haigneré held the role of Director of Universcience until 2015, at which point she resumed serving as a special advisor to ESA's Director General.

In 2018, Haigneré agreed to chair the jury of the DStv Eutelsat Star Awards, which is an annual pan-African student competition in which students write an essay or create a poster focusing on science and technology fields as a source of inspiration to unlock opportunities for Africa. The essays and posters will then be judged by an international panel of industry experts, government and academic world members, based on accuracy, creativity, originality and innovation. Haigneré's acceptance of this assignment marked the first time a woman has served on the panel for the DStv Eutelsat Star Awards.

== Honours ==
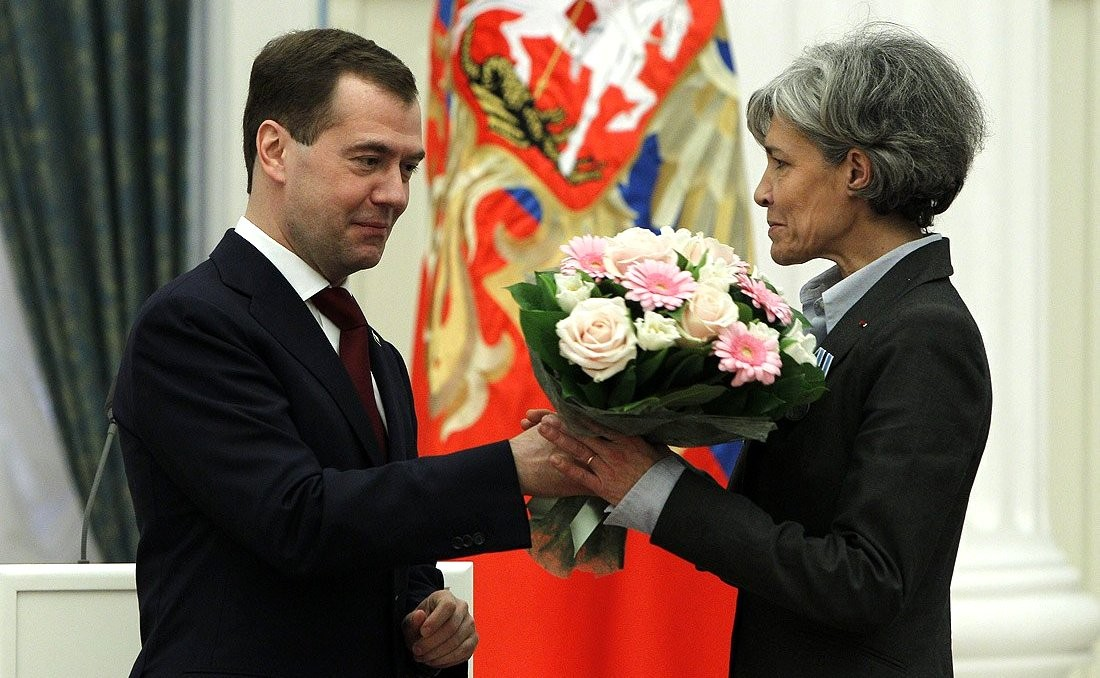
Haigneré receives the Medal "For Merit in Space Exploration" from Russian president Dmitry Medvedev on 12 April 2011 at the Moscow Kremlin

Haigneré received many honors during her career. She received the Chevalier of the Légion d'Honneur as well as the Chevalier of the Ordre National du Mérite. To recognize her outstanding involvement in the Franco-Russian space cooperation, she received the Russian Order of Friendship. She also received the Russian Medal For Merit in Space Exploration and Medal for Personal Valour.

Haigneré is also an honorary member of the Société Française de Médecine Aéronautique et Spatiale and the Association Aéronautique et Astronautique de France (AAAF). She also holds membership in the International Academy of Astronautics (IAA) and of the Académie de l'Air et de l'Espace (ANAE).

There are streets named after her in the French towns of Claira, Franqueville-Saint-Pierre, Marignane, Mudaison and Valliquerville.

Matthieu Blazy's graduation collection was inspired by Haigneré and, following his move to the brand, she sat on the front row of Chanel's A/W26 show.
