= Soyuz TM-33 =

2001 Russian crewed spaceflight to the ISS

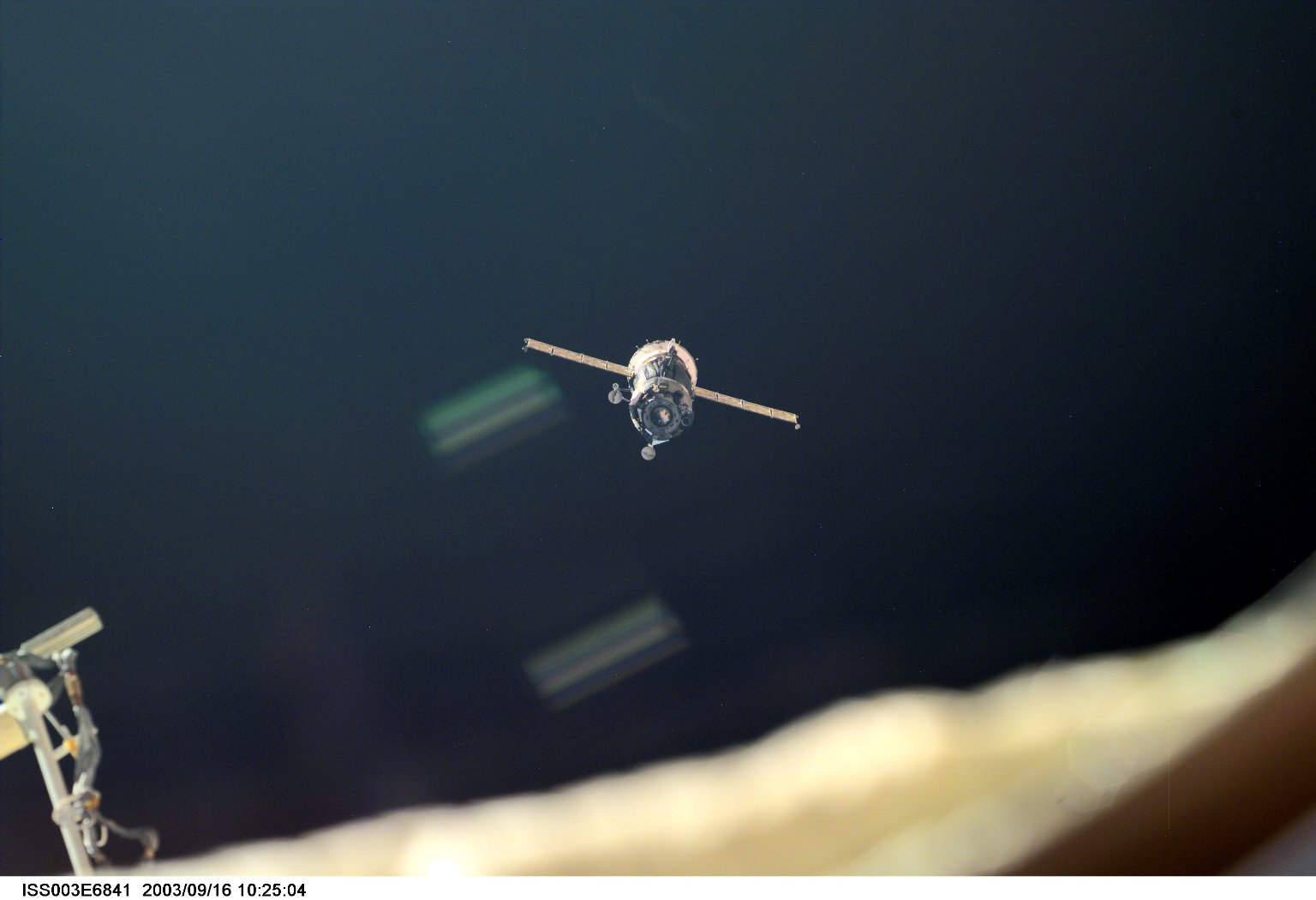
- TM-33 approaches the ISS
- Mission type: ISS crew transport
- Operator: Russian Space Agency
- COSPAR ID: 2001-048A
- SATCAT no.: 26955
- Mission duration: 195 days, 18 hours, 52 minutes, 18 seconds
- Orbits completed: ~3,195

Spacecraft properties
- Spacecraft: Soyuz-TM
- Spacecraft type: Soyuz-TM
- Manufacturer: Energia

Crew
- Crew size: 3
- Launching: Viktor Afanasyev; Claudie Haigneré; Konstantin Kozeyev
- Landing: Yuri Gidzenko; Roberto Vittori; Mark Shuttleworth
- Callsign: Uran

Start of mission
- Launch date: October 21, 2001, 08:59:35 UTC
- Rocket: Soyuz-U
- Launch site: Baikonur, Site 1/5
- Contractor: Progress

End of mission
- Landing date: May 5, 2002, 03:51:53 UTC
- Landing site: 26 kilometres (16 mi) SE of Arkalyk

Orbital parameters
- Reference system: Geocentric
- Regime: Low Earth
- Perigee altitude: 191 kilometres (119 mi)
- Apogee altitude: 227 kilometres (141 mi)
- Inclination: 51.7 degrees
- Period: 88.4 minutes

Docking with ISS
- Docking port: Zarya nadir
- Docking date: 23 October 2001; 10:44 UTC
- Undocking date: 20 April 2002; 09:16 UTC
- Time docked: 178d 22h 32m

Docking with ISS (Relocation)
- Docking port: Pirs nadir
- Docking date: 20 April 2002; 09:37 UTC
- Undocking date: 5 May 2002; 00:31 UTC
- Time docked: 14d 14h 54m
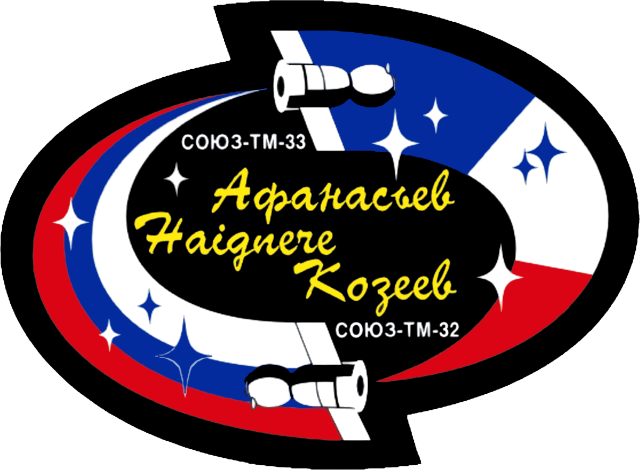
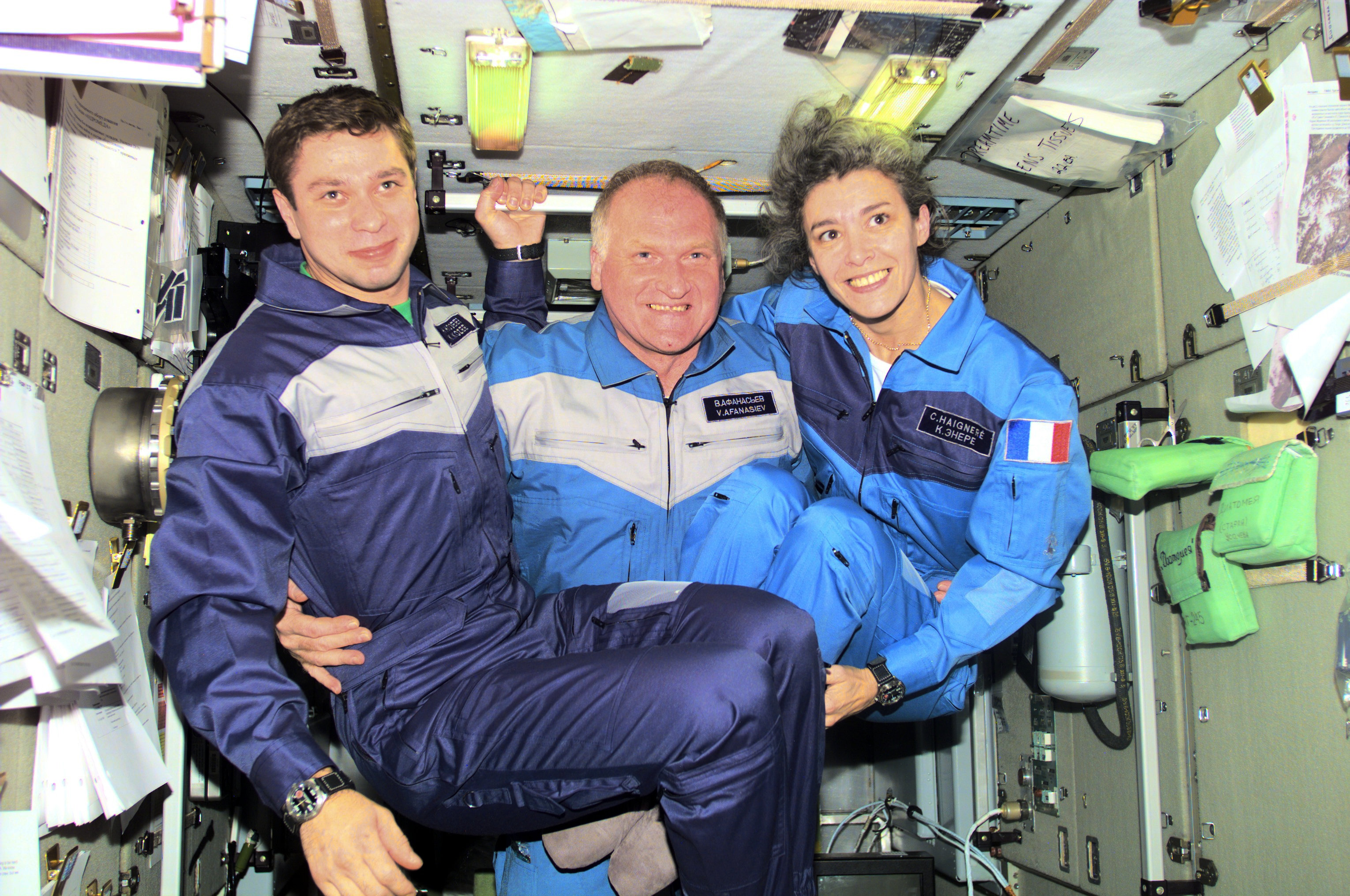
- Soyuz TM-33 Taxi crewmembers in the Zvezda Service Module Soyuz programme (Crewed missions)

Soyuz TM-33 was a crewed Russian spaceflight which launched on October 21, 2001, on the Soyuz-U launch vehicle. It carried Russian cosmonauts Viktor Afanasyev, Konstantin Kozeyev, and French cosmonaut Claudie Haigneré to the International Space Station. The European segment of the mission was called "Andromède".

== Crew ==
| Position | Launching crew | Landing crew |
|---|---|---|
| Commander | (Russia) Viktor Afanasyev, RSA; Fourth and last spaceflight | (Russia) Yuri Gidzenko, RSA; Third and last spaceflight |
| Flight Engineer | (France) Claudie Haigneré, ESA; Second and last spaceflight | (Italy) Roberto Vittori, ESA; First spaceflight |
| Flight Engineer/Spaceflight Participant | (Russia) Konstantin Kozeyev, RSA; Only spaceflight | (South Africa) Mark Shuttleworth, SA; Only spaceflight Tourist |

== Docking with ISS ==
- Docked to ISS: October 23, 2001, 10:44 UTC (to nadir port of Zarya)
- Undocked from ISS: April 20, 2002, 09:16 UTC (from nadir port of Zarya)
- Docked to ISS: April 20, 2002, 09:37 UTC (to Pirs module)
- Undocked from ISS: May 5, 2002, 00:31 UTC (from Pirs module)

== Mission highlights ==
14th crewed mission to ISS.

Soyuz TM-33 is a Russian astronaut-transporting spacecraft that was launched by a Soyuz-U rocket from Baikonur at 08:59 UT on 21 October 2001. It carried two Russian and one French astronaut to the International Space Station (ISS). It docked with the ISS at 10:44 UT on 23 October. This new crew spent eight days on the ISS, and returned on the older Soyuz TM-32 at 04:59 UT on 31 October. The new Soyuz remained docked as a lifeboat craft for the then current crew of three (two Russian and one American) astronauts.
