= Spaceflight participant =

Non-professional space traveler

Spaceflight participant (Russian: участник космического полета, romanized: uchastnik kosmicheskogo polyota) is the term used by NASA, Roscosmos, and the Federal Aviation Administration (FAA) for people who travel into space, but are not professional astronauts or cosmonauts. (Note: Not always the case, since Marcos Pontes, trained in the NASA Group 17, was a spaceflight participant in the Soyuz TMA-8.)

While the term gained new prominence with the rise of space tourism, it has also been used for participants in programs like NASA's Teacher in Space and astronauts designated by inter-government agreements like the Angkasawan program and the Korean Astronaut Program.

Other terms used for space travelers who are not career astronauts include NASA's Payload Specialist and the RKA's Researcher-Cosmonaut.

== Background ==
The Soviet Interkosmos program included participants selected from Warsaw Pact members and later from allies of the USSR and non-aligned countries. Most of these people received full training for their missions and were treated as equals, but especially after the Mir program began, were generally given shorter flights than Soviet cosmonauts. The European Space Agency took advantage of the program as well.

The United States Space Shuttle program included Payload Specialist positions which were usually filled by representatives of companies or institutions managing a specific payload on that mission. These individuals did not receive the same level of training as the NASA Astronaut Corps and were private astronauts.

In the early days of the Shuttle program, NASA was also eager to prove its capability to Congressional sponsors, and Senator Jake Garn and Representative Bill Nelson were both given opportunities to fly on a Shuttle mission.

The National Aeronautics and Space Act of 1958 stated that NASA should provide the "widest practicable and appropriate dissemination of information concerning its activities and the results thereof". The Naugle panel of 1982 concluded that carrying civilians—those not NASA astronauts—on the shuttle was part of "the purpose of adding to the public's understanding of space flight". As the Shuttle program expanded, NASA developed the Space Flight Participant Program, where civilians, with an emphasis on creative people, would be sent into space to increase public awareness of NASA's mission. The initial goal was that two or three shuttle missions a year would include a civilian participant. The agency hoped that potential passengers such as Walter Cronkite and James Michener could "communicate" space to the public. The first would be the Teacher in Space Project, which would combine publicity and educational opportunities for NASA. Christa McAuliffe would have been the first Teacher in Space, but she was killed in the Challenger disaster and the program was canceled. At the time of the Challenger disaster, NASA was planning to include a Journalist in Space on a mission scheduled to launch in September 1986. The program continued briefly, with the initial candidate pool being narrowed to 100 in March and 40 in April before being postponed indefinitely in July. Walter Cronkite and Miles O'Brien were considered front-runners.

With the realities of the post-perestroika economy in Russia, its space industry was especially starved for cash. The Tokyo Broadcasting System (TBS) offered to pay for one of its reporters to fly on a mission. For $28 million, Toyohiro Akiyama, was flown in 1990 to Mir with the eighth crew and returned a week later with the seventh crew. Akiyama gave a daily television broadcast from orbit and also performed scientific experiments for Russian and Japanese companies.

Since then, the Russian Federal Space Agency has also sold seats to a consortium of British companies for Project Juno, to seven self-funded space tourists, to the Malaysian government as part of a contract to sell military planes, and to the South Korean government as part of the Korean Astronaut Program.

== List of spaceflight participants ==
This list excludes Axiom Space tourists listed at List of Axiom Space Missions.

| Name | Nationality | Program/Sponsor | Flight | Date | Comments |
|---|---|---|---|---|---|
| Dennis Tito | United States | Self-funded space tourist | Soyuz TM-32 / Soyuz TM-31 | April 28 - May 6, 2001 | First space tourist. |
| Mark Shuttleworth | South Africa | Self-funded space tourist | Soyuz TM-34 / Soyuz TM-33 | April 25 - May 5, 2002 | Shuttleworth was the first person with South African citizenship to fly in space. |
| Gregory Olsen | United States | Self-funded space tourist | Soyuz TMA-7 / Soyuz TMA-6 | October 1–11, 2005 | |
| Marcos Pontes | Brazil | Missão Centenário; AEB | Soyuz TMA-8 / Soyuz TMA-7 | March 30 - April 8, 2006 | First Brazilian astronaut. Trained to fly both in the Space Shuttle during his initial NASA training and in the Soyuz after an agreement between Brazil and Russia. |
| Anousheh Ansari | Iran / United States | Self-funded space tourist | Soyuz TMA-9 / Soyuz TMA-8 | September 18–29, 2006 | Trained as back-up to Enomoto. Was the first person with Iranian citizenship to fly in space. |
| Charles Simonyi | Hungary / United States | Self-funded space tourist | Soyuz TMA-10 / Soyuz TMA-9 | April 7–21, 2007 | |
| Sheikh Muszaphar Shukor | Malaysia | Angkasawan program | Soyuz TMA-11 / Soyuz TMA-10 | 10–21 October 2007 | Back-up was Faiz Khaleed. |
| Yi So-yeon | South Korea | Korean Astronaut Program | Soyuz TMA-12 / Soyuz TMA-11 | 8–19 April 2008 | Back-up was Ko San. |
| Richard Garriott | United States | Self-funded space tourist | Soyuz TMA-13 / Soyuz TMA-12 | 12 October 2008 - 23 October 2008 | Back-up was Nik Halik. |
| Charles Simonyi | Hungary / United States | Self-funded space tourist | Soyuz TMA-14 / Soyuz TMA-13 | 26 March 2009 - 8 April 2009 | Backup was Esther Dyson. Simonyi was the first repeat space tourist. |
| Guy Laliberté | Canada | Self-funded space tourist | Soyuz TMA-16 / Soyuz TMA-14 | 30 September 2009 - 11 October 2009 | First Canadian space tourist. Backup was Barbara Barrett |
| Hazza Al Mansouri | UAE | Mohammed bin Rashid Space Centre | Soyuz MS-15/Soyuz MS-12 | 25 September 2019 - 3 October 2019 | First UAE citizen to fly in space. Originally scheduled to launch on Soyuz MS-12 and land on Soyuz MS-10. This was changed to Soyuz MS-15 after Soyuz MS-10 aborted during launch. |
| Klim Shipenko | Russia | Channel One | Soyuz MS-19/Soyuz MS-18 | 5-18 October 2021 | Members of the movie project "The Challenge". They have Aleksey Dudin and Alena Mordovina as their backup. |
| Yulia Peresild | Russia | Channel One | Soyuz MS-19/Soyuz MS-18 | 5-18 October 2021 | Members of the movie project "The Challenge". They have Aleksey Dudin and Alena Mordovina as their backup. |
| Yusaku Maezawa | Japan | Self-funded space tourist | Soyuz MS-20 | 8-20 December 2021 | Maezawa and Hirano were the first space tourists from Japan. Maezawa purchased two seats from Space Adventures. There was no backup crew for Maezawa but Shun Ogiso, the Public Relations Manager of the Start Today corporation, was backup for Hirano. |
| Yozo Hirano | Japan | Self-funded space tourist | Soyuz MS-20 | 8-20 December 2021 | Maezawa and Hirano were the first space tourists from Japan. Maezawa purchased two seats from Space Adventures. There was no backup crew for Maezawa but Shun Ogiso, the Public Relations Manager of the Start Today corporation, was backup for Hirano. |
| Marina Vasilevskaya | Belarus | Belarus Space Agency | Soyuz MS-25 / MS-24 | March 25 - April 6, 2024 | First Belarusian in space. |
| Chun Wang | Malta / Saint Kitts and Nevis (Note: Wang was born in China but lives primarily in Svalbard and since 2023 is also a citizen of Malta and Saint Kitts and Nevis through their golden visa programs. He will wear the flag of Malta on his spacesuit during the spaceflight.) | Self-funded space tourist | Fram2 | April 1-4, 2025 | First crewed spaceflight to enter a polar orbit around Earth. First citizen from Malta and Saint Kitts and Nevis in space. |
| Jannicke Mikkelsen | Norway | Self-funded space tourist | Fram2 | April 1-4, 2025 | First crewed spaceflight to enter a polar orbit around Earth. First citizen from Norway in space. |
| Rabea Rogge | Germany | Self-funded space tourist | Fram2 | April 1-4, 2025 | First crewed spaceflight to enter a polar orbit around Earth. First German women in space. |
| Eric Philips | Australia | Self-funded space tourist | Fram2 | April 1-4, 2025 | First crewed spaceflight to enter a polar orbit around Earth. |
In progress flight
None
Future flights
None planned as of now
Failed attempts
| Christa McAuliffe | United States | Teacher in Space Project | STS-51-L | 28 January 1986 | Killed alongside six fellow crew members in the Space Shuttle Challenger disaster. Back-up was Barbara Morgan, who was selected in 1998 to train as a mission specialist. Morgan finally flew to space aboard STS-118 in 2007, but as a "teacher-turned-astronaut", not a space flight participant. |
| Lance Bass | United States | Corporate-funded space tourist | | | Completed training but seat on Soyuz TMA-1 in 2002 was cancelled after funding fell through. |
| Daisuke Enomoto | Japan | Self-funded space tourist | | | Expected to fly on Soyuz TMA-9 in September 2006, but was grounded for medical reasons and seat was given to Ansari. |
| Sarah Brightman | United Kingdom | Self-funded space tourist | Soyuz TMA-18M / Soyuz TMA-16M | Scheduled for 1 September 2015 - 11 September 2015 | Space Adventures announced on October 10, 2012, that Sarah Brightman would fly to the International Space Station on an upcoming Soyuz flight. Backup was Satoshi Takamatsu. She subsequently pulled out of the flight. |
| Vladimir Gruzdev | Russia | Political party-sponsored trip | | | Was expected to fly in 2009. The United Russia political party was expected to pay the estimated $25 million for the flight from the party funds. |

The first eight space tourism trips went to and from the International Space Station on Soyuz spacecraft and were arranged through the space tourism company, Space Adventures.

== Other missions ==
While not labeled as "spaceflight participants", the following people participated in NASA or Roscosmos spaceflight missions under the auspices of special programs outside the professional astronaut corps.

| Name | Nationality | Program/Sponsor | Flight | Date | Comments |
|---|---|---|---|---|---|
| Jake Garn | United States | US Government | STS-51-D | 12–19 April 1985 | To demonstrate the capabilities of the Space Shuttle, NASA offered a seat to Garn, a member of the Senate Appropriations Committee. |
| Bill Nelson | United States | US Government | STS-61-C | 12–18 January 1986 | NASA also provided a seat to Nelson, a member of the U.S. House of Representatives at the time and future Administrator of NASA. He was originally scheduled to be aboard STS-51-L. |
| Edward C. Aldridge Jr. | United States | US Government | STS-62-A | | NASA assigned a seat to Aldridge, the Secretary of the Air Force, on mission STS-62-A, the first Shuttle mission scheduled to launch from Vandenberg Air Force Base. After the Space Shuttle Challenger disaster, the mission was cancelled and Aldridge never flew. |
| Toyohiro Akiyama | Japan | Tokyo Broadcasting System | Soyuz TM-11 / Soyuz TM-10 | 2–10 December 1990 | As an employee of TBS, Akiyama could be considered the first space business traveler. |
| Helen Sharman | United Kingdom | Project Juno | Soyuz TM-12 / Soyuz TM-11 | 18–26 May 1991 | Through Project Juno, a consortium of British companies partially funded a seat on a Soyuz flight to Mir (the Soviet Union covered the rest of the cost) in order to put the first Briton into space. |

== Private employers ==
People who flew into space as private sector employees - they were not necessarily considered spaceflight participants in their flights:

| Name | Missions | Time in space | Company | Refs. |
|---|---|---|---|---|
| (United States) Charles Walker | (United States) STS-41-D (United States) STS-51-D (United States) STS-61-B | 19d 21h 56m | MDAC | |
| (United States) Robert Cenker | (United States) STS-61-C | 6d 02h 03m | RCA | |
| (United States) Gregory Jarvis | (United States) STS-51-L | Died at launch. | HACES | |
| (Japan) Toyohiro Akiyama | (Soviet Union) Soyuz TM-11 | 7d 21h 54m | TBS | |
| (United Kingdom) Helen Sharman | (Soviet Union) Soyuz TM-12 | 7d 21h 13m | MNB | |
| (Russia) Klim Shipenko | (Russia) Soyuz MS-19 | 11d 19h 40m | PERVK | |
| (Russia) Yulia Peresild | (Russia) Soyuz MS-19 | 11d 19h 40m | PERVK | |

== See also ==
- Commercial astronaut
- Space tourism
