= S. Vanajah =

Malaysian engineer (born 1971)

Siva Vanajah (born March 2, 1971, in Kulim, Malaysia) is a Malaysian engineer and one of the finalist of the Malaysian Angkasawan program, a program to send a Malaysian to the International Space Station.

An ethnic Indian, she was the only woman among four finalists who outlasted 11,000 other Malaysians that applied for the astronaut selection process in 2003, ultimately losing her bid to Sheikh Muszaphar Shukor and Faiz Khaleed. All the four finalists were sent to Moscow for training by the Russian Space Agency.
