= Malaysian Centre of Remote Sensing =

The Malaysian Centre of Remote Sensing (MACRES) was a Malaysian remote sensing centre. An agency under the Ministry of Science, Technology and Innovation (Malaysia). Its role was to provide data and solutions for remote sensing applications. In 1991, it was recognised as a federal institute of research in the field of remote sensing and related technologies. The main centre was located in Kuala Lumpur and the ground receiving centre was located in Mentakab, Pahang, Malaysia.

On 15 February 2008, MACRES was upgraded as a full government department and known as Malaysian Remote Sensing Agency (MRSA). In 2019, it had merging with National Space Agency (ANGKASA) bring about the establishment of Malaysian Space Agency (MYSA).

== See also ==
- Malaysian Space Agency (MYSA)
- Malaysian Remote Sensing Agency (MRSA)
- National Space Agency (ANGKASA)
