= Timeline of space travel by nationality =

Map of countries (and successor states) that have sent humans into space as of June 2025. In dark blue are countries with own human spacecraft.

Since the first human spaceflight by the Soviet Union, citizens of 55 countries have flown in space. For each nationality, the launch date of the first mission is listed. The list is based on the nationality of the person at the time of the launch. Only eight of 55 countries have been represented by female "first flyers" (Helen Sharman for the United Kingdom in 1991, Anousheh Ansari for Iran in 2006, Yi So-yeon for South Korea in 2008, Sara Sabry for Egypt in 2022, Keisha Schahaff and Anastatia Mayers for Antigua and Barbuda in 2023, Namira Salim for Pakistan in 2023, Marina Vasilevskaya for Belarus in 2024, and Aisha Bowe for The Bahamas in 2025.) In 2026, female astronaut Lai Ka-ying became the first citizen of Hong Kong to fly to space; Hong Kong is a territory of China and Ka-ying is also a Chinese citizen. Only three nations (Soviet Union/Russia, U.S., China) have launched their own crewed spacecraft, with the Soviets/Russians and the American programs providing rides to other nations' astronauts. Twenty-eight "first flights" occurred on Soviet or Russian flights while the United States carried twenty-six.

== Timeline ==
Note: All dates given are UTC. Countries indicated in bold have achieved independent human spaceflight capability.

No.	Country	Name	Flight	Date (UTC)
1960s
**1**	**Soviet Union (Note: The first cosmonaut, Yuri Gagarin, held citizenship in both the Soviet Union and the Russian SFSR, according to the applicable provisions of the Constitution of the Soviet Union. On 26 December 1991, the Soviet Union dissolved, and was replaced by Armenia, Azerbaijan, Belarus, Georgia, Kazakhstan, Kyrgyzstan, Moldova, Russia, Tajikistan, Turkmenistan, Ukraine, and Uzbekistan; Estonia, Latvia and Lithuania restored their independence. At the time of the dissolution, Sergei Krikalev and Alexander Volkov were orbiting Earth on Mir, having been launched into orbit as Soviet citizens, and having returned to the Earth as Russian citizens. Aleksandr Kaleri and Aleksandr Viktorenko were the first Russians to be launched into orbit as Russian citizens only, their launch having occurred subsequent to the dissolution of the Soviet Union.)**	Yuri Gagarin	(Soviet Union) Vostok 1	12 April 1961
**2**	**United States (Note: Shepard's spaceflight was suborbital. The first American to be launched into Earth orbit was John Glenn, on 20 February 1962.)**	Alan Shepard	(United States) MR-3	5 May 1961
1970s
3	Czechoslovakia (Note: Czechoslovakia was a federation since 1969. Vladimír Remek was a citizen of both Czechoslovakia and Czechia (Czech Socialist Republic). In 1993, Czechoslovakia dissolved and was replaced by the Czech Republic and Slovakia.)	Vladimír Remek	(Soviet Union) Soyuz 28	2 March 1978
4	Poland	Mirosław Hermaszewski	(Soviet Union) Soyuz 30	27 June 1978
5	East Germany (Note: In 1978, both Jähn himself and the German Democratic Republic pronounced him the "first German in space", rather than the first "citizen of the German Democratic Republic in space". In 1990, the states of the former East Germany acceded to the Federal Republic of Germany. On 22 January 1992, Ulf Merbold again traveled into space, now representing the reunited Germany within the Federal Republic of Germany. Jähn is, nevertheless, still considered the first German in space, even in the states of the Federal Republic of Germany that comprised the former West Germany.)	Sigmund Jähn	(Soviet Union) Soyuz 31	26 August 1978
6	Bulgaria	Georgi Ivanov	(Soviet Union) Soyuz 33	10 April 1979
1980s
7	Hungary	Bertalan Farkas	(Soviet Union) Soyuz 36	26 May 1980
8	Vietnam	Phạm Tuân	(Soviet Union) Soyuz 37	23 July 1980
9	Cuba	Arnaldo Tamayo Méndez	(Soviet Union) Soyuz 38	18 September 1980
10	Mongolia	Jügderdemidiin Gürragchaa	(Soviet Union) Soyuz 39	22 March 1981
11	Romania	Dumitru Prunariu	(Soviet Union) Soyuz 40	14 May 1981
12	France	Jean-Loup Chrétien	(Soviet Union) Soyuz T-6	24 June 1982
13	West Germany	Ulf Merbold	(United States) STS-9	28 November 1983
14	India	Rakesh Sharma	(Soviet Union) Soyuz T-11	3 April 1984
15	Canada	Marc Garneau	(United States) STS-41-G	5 October 1984
16	Saudi Arabia	Sultan al-Saud	(United States) STS-51-G	17 June 1985
17	Netherlands	Wubbo Ockels	(United States) STS-61-A	30 October 1985
18	Mexico	Rodolfo Neri Vela	(United States) STS-61-B	26 November 1985
19	Syria	Muhammed Faris	(Soviet Union) Soyuz TM-3	22 July 1987
20	Afghanistan	Abdul Ahad Momand	(Soviet Union) Soyuz TM-6	29 August 1988
1990s
21	Japan	Toyohiro Akiyama (Note: This person flew as a commercial, non-governmental space traveller. Apart from Akiyama and Sharman, these space travellers are known as space tourists.)	(Soviet Union) Soyuz TM-11	2 December 1990
22	United Kingdom	Helen Sharman	(Soviet Union) Soyuz TM-12	18 May 1991
23	Austria	Franz Viehböck	(Soviet Union) Soyuz TM-13	2 October 1991
**24**	**Russia**	Aleksandr Kaleri; Aleksandr Viktorenko	(Russia) Soyuz TM-14	17 March 1992
25	Belgium	Dirk Frimout	(United States) STS-45	24 March 1992
26	Italy	Franco Malerba	(United States) STS-46	31 July 1992
26	Switzerland	Claude Nicollier	(United States) STS-46	31 July 1992
28	Ukraine	Leonid Kadenyuk	(United States) STS-87	19 November 1997
29	Spain	Pedro Duque	(United States) STS-95	29 October 1998
30	Slovakia	Ivan Bella	(Russia) Soyuz TM-29	20 February 1999
2000s
31	South Africa	Mark Shuttleworth	(Russia) Soyuz TM-34	25 April 2002
32	Israel (Note: Ilan Ramon was the first Israeli to go into space, but Ramon died during reentry during the Space Shuttle Columbia disaster. His close friend and colleague, Eytan Stibbe, would later become the first Israeli to return from space alive, with the splashdown of Axiom-1 on 25 April 2022.)	Ilan Ramon	(United States) STS-107	16 January 2003
**33**	**China**	Yang Liwei	(China) Shenzhou 5	15 October 2003
34	Brazil	Marcos Pontes	(Russia) Soyuz TMA-8	30 March 2006
35	Iran (Note: Although recognized as an Iranian citizen by Iranian law, Ansari is also an American citizen and was prohibited from wearing Iranian state symbols by both the United States and Russian governments.)	Anousheh Ansari	(Russia) Soyuz TMA-9	18 September 2006
36	Sweden	Christer Fuglesang	(United States) STS-116	10 December 2006
37	Malaysia	Sheikh Muszaphar Shukor	(Russia) Soyuz TMA-11	10 October 2007
38	South Korea	Yi So-yeon	(Russia) Soyuz TMA-12	8 April 2008
2010s
39	Denmark	Andreas Mogensen	(Russia) Soyuz TMA-18M	2 September 2015
39	Kazakhstan	Aidyn Aimbetov	(Russia) Soyuz TMA-18M	2 September 2015
41	United Arab Emirates	Hazza Al Mansouri	(Russia) Soyuz MS-15	25 September 2019
2020s
42	Australia (Note: Boshuizen's flight was suborbital. The first Australian citizen to be launched into Earth orbit was Eric Philips, on 1 April 2025.)	Chris Boshuizen	(United States) Blue Origin NS-18	13 October 2021
43	Portugal (Note: This flight was suborbital.)	Mário Ferreira	(United States) Blue Origin NS-22	4 August 2022
43	Egypt	Sara Sabry	(United States) Blue Origin NS-22	4 August 2022
45	Antigua and Barbuda	Keisha Schahaff; Anastatia Mayers	(United States) Galactic 02 (Note: This was a suborbital flight aboard a SpaceShipTwo vehicle. SpaceShipTwo flights surpass the U.S. definition of spaceflight (50 mi (80.47 km)), but fall short of the Kármán line (100 km (62.14 mi)), the FAI definition used for most space recordkeeping.)	10 August 2023
46	Pakistan	Namira Salim	(United States) Galactic 04	6 October 2023
47	Turkey	Alper Gezeravcı	(United States) Axiom Mission 3	18 January 2024
47	Norway	Marcus Wandt	(United States) Axiom Mission 3	18 January 2024
49	Belarus	Marina Vasilevskaya	(Russia) Soyuz MS-25	23 March 2024
50	Malta	Chun Wang (Note: Wang was born in China but lives primarily in Svalbard and since 2023 is also a citizen of Malta and Saint Kitts and Nevis through their golden visa programs. He will wear the flag of Malta on his spacesuit during the spaceflight.)	(United States) Fram2	1 April 2025
50	Saint Kitts and Nevis	Chun Wang	(United States) Fram2	1 April 2025
52	The Bahamas	Aisha Bowe	(United States) Blue Origin NS-31	14 April 2025
53	Panama	Jaime Alemán	(United States) Blue Origin NS-32	31 May 2025
53	New Zealand	Mark Rocket	(United States) Blue Origin NS-32	31 May 2025
55	Nigeria	Owolabi Salis	(United States) Blue Origin NS-33	29 June 2025
56	Hong Kong, China	Lai Ka-ying	(China) Shenzhou 23	24 May 2026

== Other claims ==
The above list uses the nationality at the time of launch updated in 2025. Lists with differing criteria might include the following people:

- Pavel Popovich, first launched 12 August 1962, was the first Ukrainian-born man in space. At the time, Ukraine was a part of the Union of Soviet Socialist Republics.
- Michael Collins, first launched 18 July 1966 was born in Italy to American parents and was an American citizen when he went into space.
- William Anders, American citizen, first launched 21 December 1968, was the first Hong Kong-born man in space.
- Vladimir Shatalov, first launched 14 January 1969, was the first Kazakh-born man in space. At the time, Kazakhstan was a part of the Union of Soviet Socialist Republics.
- Bill Pogue, first launched 16 November 1973, as an inductee to the 5 Civilized Tribes Hall of Fame can lay claim to being the first Native American in space. See John Herrington below regarding technicality of tribal registration.
- Pyotr Klimuk, first launched 18 December 1973, was the first Belarusian-born man in space. At the time, Belarus was a part of the Union of Soviet Socialist Republics.
- Vladimir Dzhanibekov, first launched 16 March 1978, was the first Uzbek-born man in space. At the time, Uzbekistan was a part of the Union of Soviet Socialist Republics.
- Paul D. Scully-Power, first launched 5 October 1984, was born in Australia, but was an American citizen when he went into space; Australian law at the time forbade dual-citizenship.
- Taylor Gun-Jin Wang, first launched 29 April 1985, was born in China to Chinese parents, but was an American citizen when he went into space.
- Lodewijk van den Berg, launched 29 April 1985, was born in the Netherlands, but was an American citizen when he went into space.
- Patrick Baudry, first launched 17 June 1985, was born in French Cameroun (now part of Cameroon), but was a French citizen when he went into space.
- Shannon Lucid, first launched 17 June 1985, was born in China to American parents of European descent, and was an American citizen when she went into space.
- Franklin Chang-Diaz, first launched 12 January 1986, was born in Costa Rica, but was an American citizen when he went into space
- Musa Manarov, first launched 21 December 1987, was the first Azerbaijan-born man in space. At the time, Azerbaijan was a part of the Union of Soviet Socialist Republics.
- Anatoly Solovyev, first launched 7 June 1988, was the first Latvian-born man in space. At the time, Latvia was a part of the Union of Soviet Socialist Republics.
- Sergei Konstantinovich Krikalev and Aleksandr Aleksandrovich Volkov became Russian rather than Soviet citizens while still in orbit aboard Mir, making them the first purely Russian citizens in space.
- James H. Newman, American citizen, first launched 12 September 1993, was born in the portion of the United Nations Trust Territory of the Pacific Islands that is now the Federated States of Micronesia.
- Talgat Musabayev, first launched 1 July 1994, was born in the Kazakh SSR and is known in Kazakhstan as the "first cosmonaut of independent Kazakhstan", but was a Russian citizen when he went into space.
- Frederick W. Leslie, American citizen, launched 20 October 1995, was born in Panama Canal Zone (now Panama).
- Andy Thomas, first launched 19 May 1996, was born in Australia but like Paul D. Scully-Power was an American citizen when he went to space; Australian law at the time forbade dual-citizenship.
- Carlos I. Noriega, first launched 15 May 1997, was born in Peru, but was an American citizen when he went into space.
- Bjarni Tryggvason, launched 7 August 1997, was born in Iceland, but was a Canadian citizen when he went into space.
- Salizhan Sharipov, first launched 22 January 1998, was born in Kyrgyzstan (then the Kirghiz SSR), but was a Russian citizen when he went into space. Sharipov is of Uzbek ancestry.
- Philippe Perrin, first launched 5 June 2002, was born in Morocco, but was a French citizen when he went into space.
- John Herrington, an American citizen first launched 24 November 2002, is the first tribal registered Native American in space (Chickasaw). See also Bill Pogue above.
- Fyodor Yurchikhin, first launched 7 October 2002, was born in Georgia (then the Georgian SSR). He was a Russian citizen at the time he went into space and is of Pontian Greek descent.
- Fernando Caldeiro, first launched January 2006, was born in Argentina, but worked under NASA as an American citizen.
- Joseph M. Acaba, first launched 15 March 2009, was born in the U.S. state of California to American parents of Puerto Rican descent.
- Aymette (Amy) Medina Jorge, first launched May 31, 2025, was the first person born in Puerto Rico to fly in space.

== Gallery ==
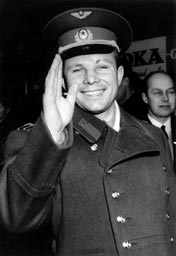
The Soviet Union's Yuri Gagarin, the first person in space (1961)

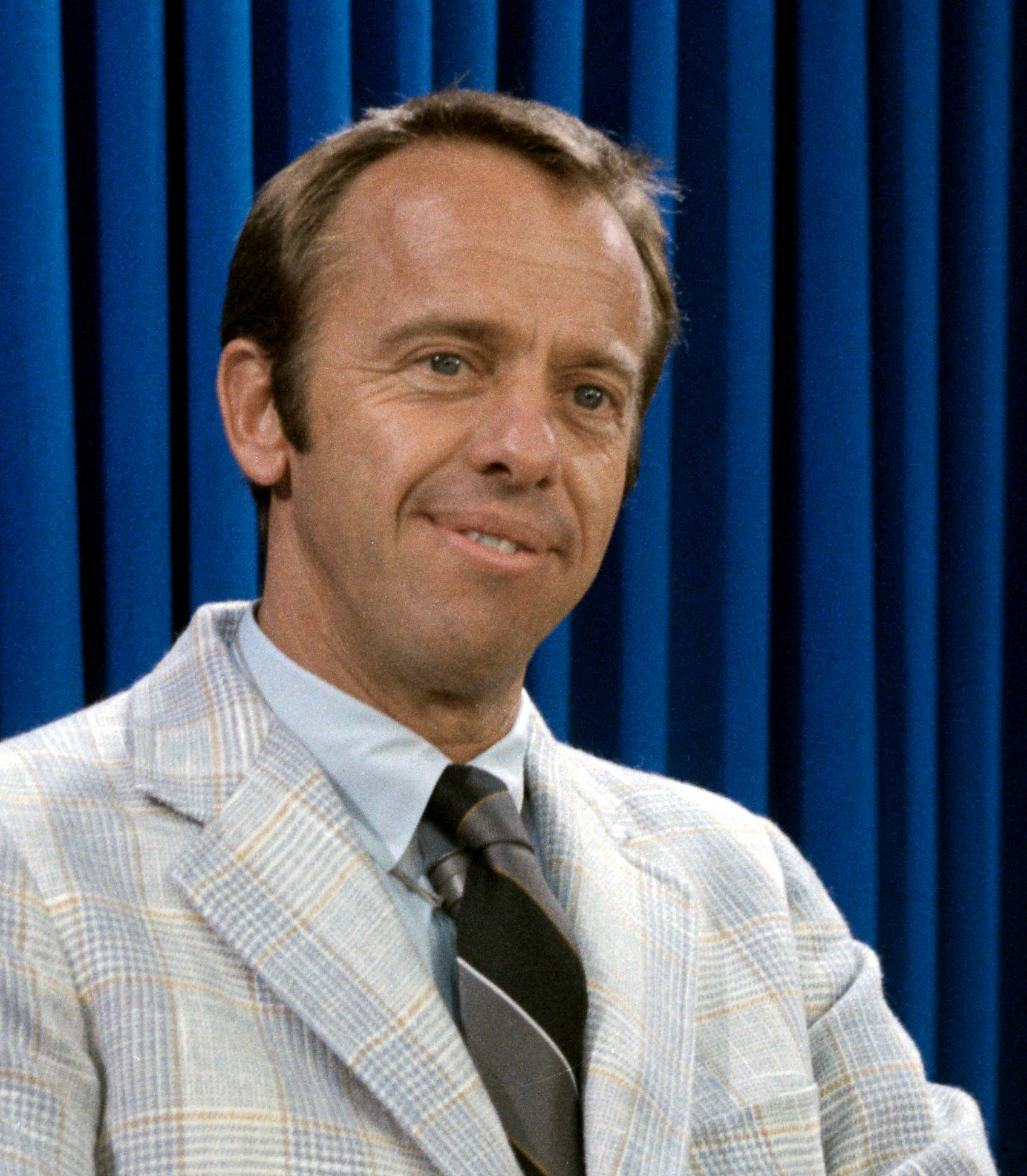
Alan Shepard from the United States of America, the second nation to send a person into space (1961)

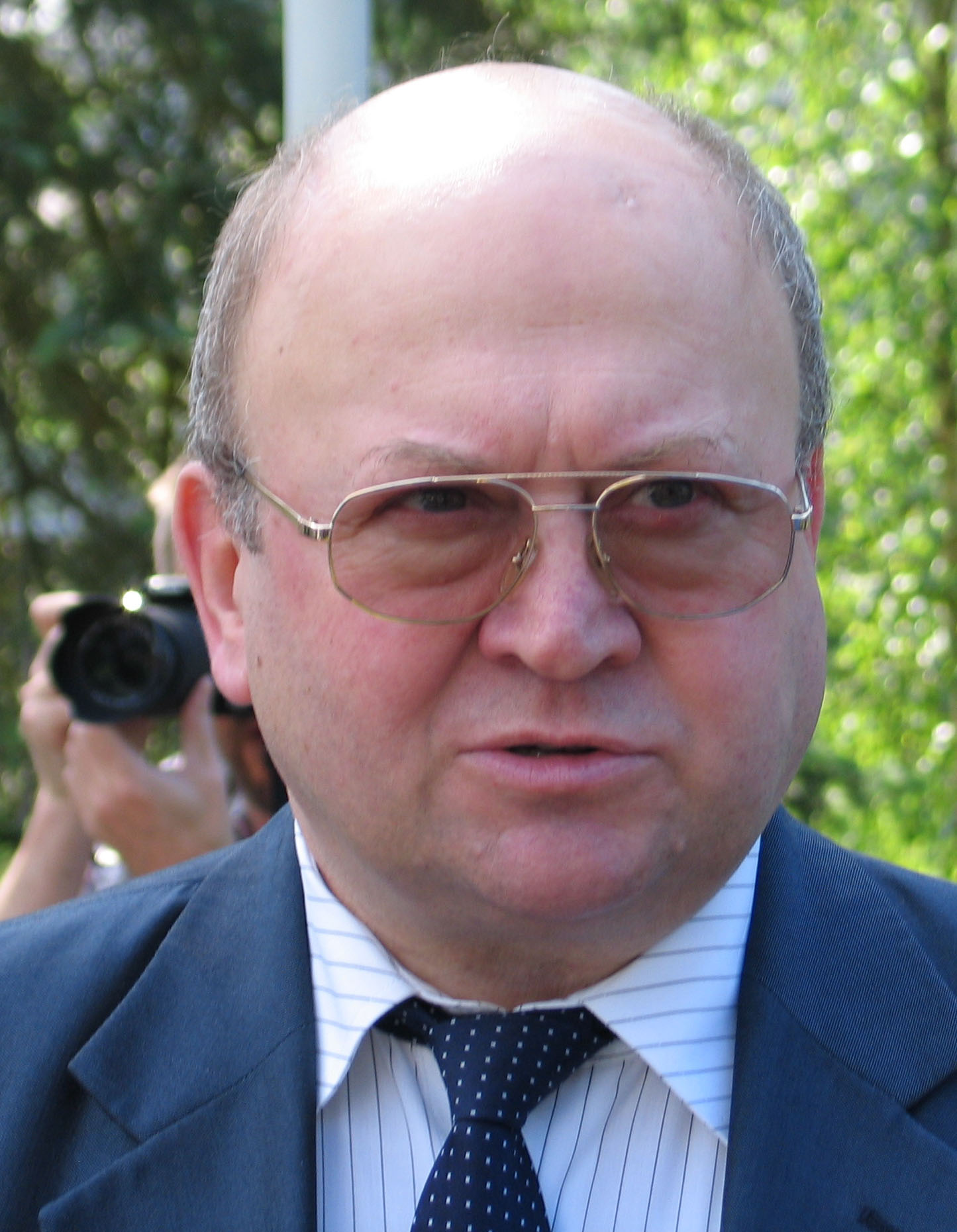
Vladimír Remek of Czechoslovakia, the first Czechoslovak national in space (1978)

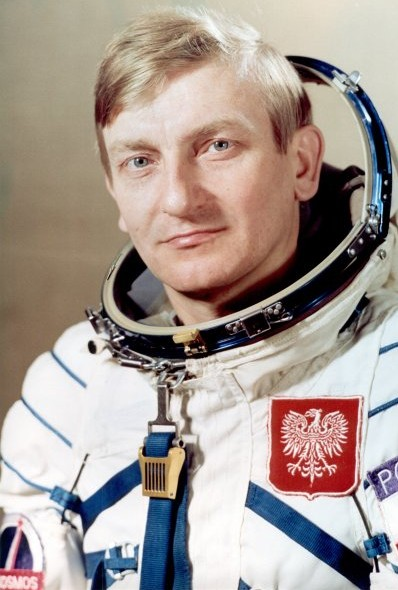
Mirosław Hermaszewski of Poland, the first Polish national in space (1978)

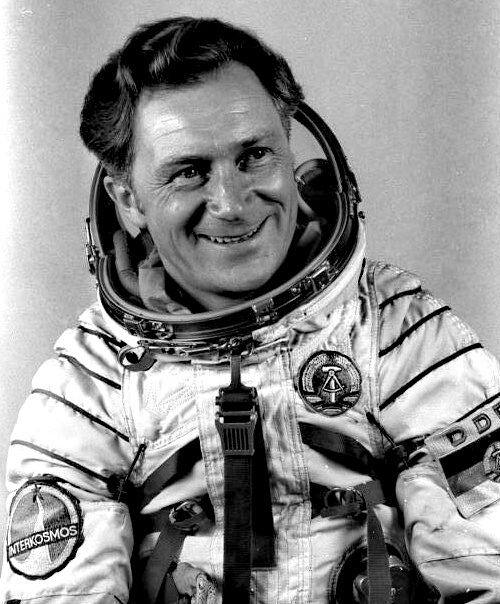
Sigmund Jähn of East Germany, the first German in space (1978)

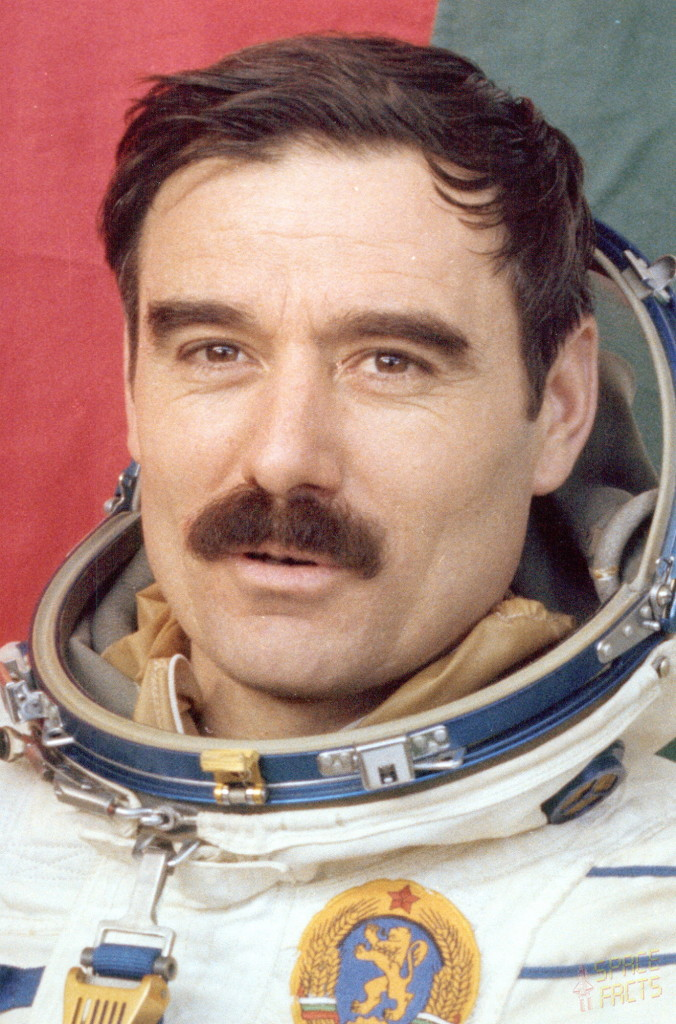
Georgi Ivanov of Bulgaria, the first Bulgarian in space (1979)

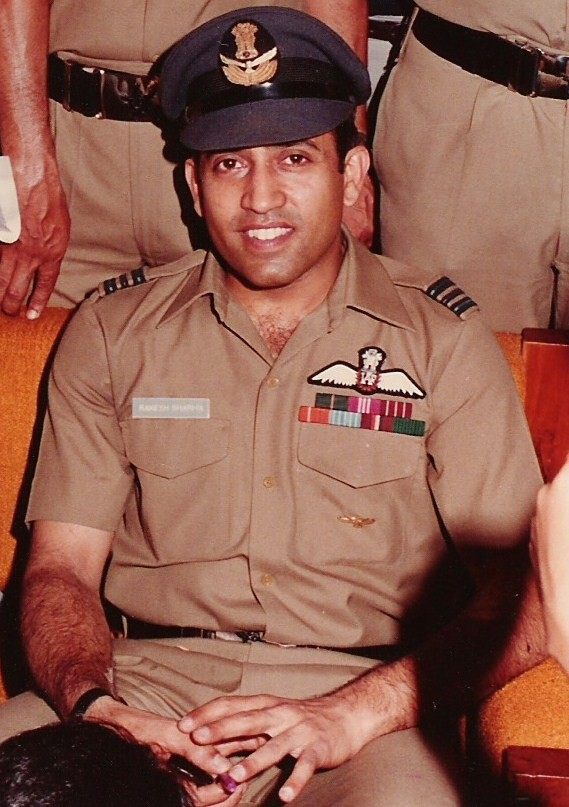
Rakesh Sharma, the first Indian in space (1984)

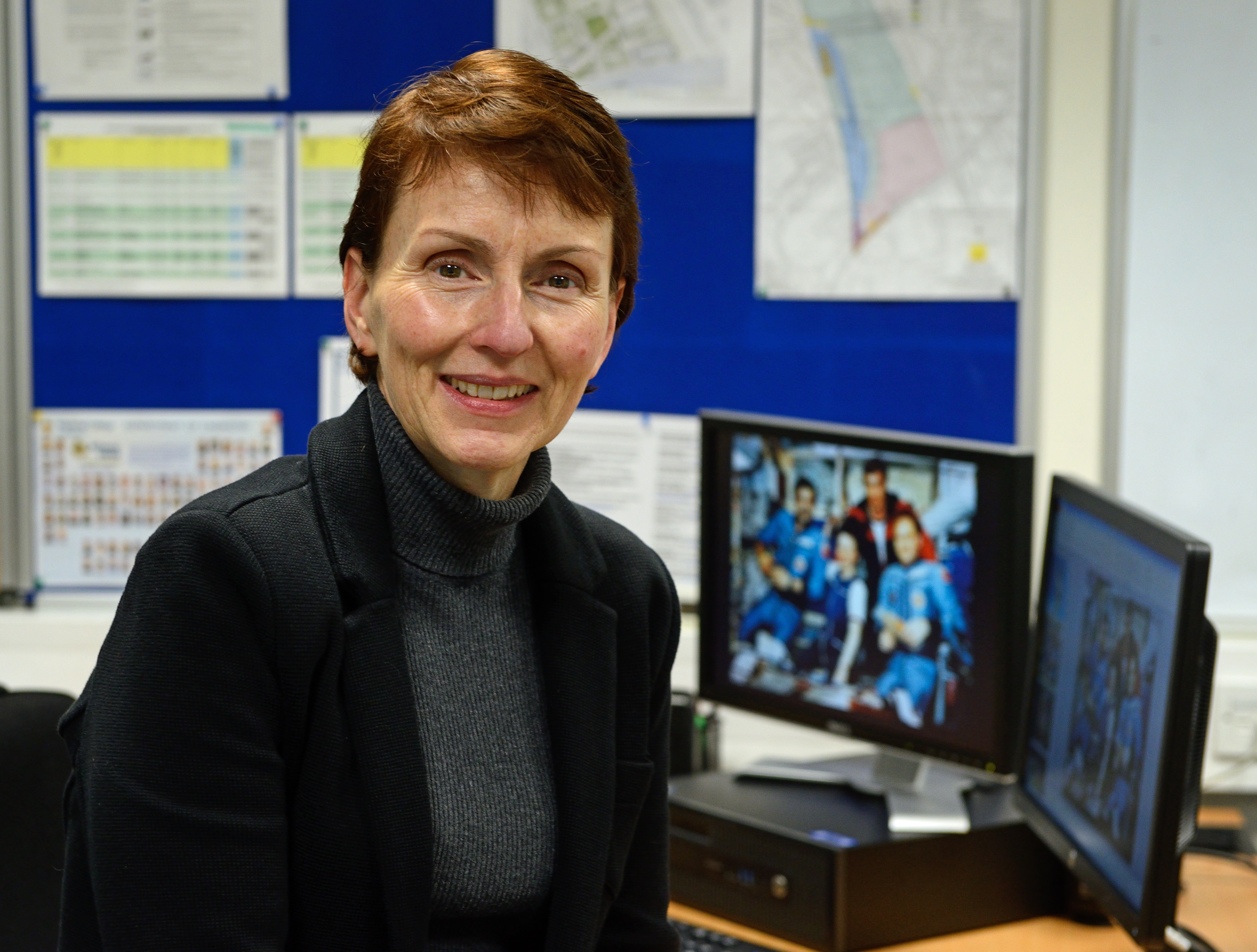
Helen Sharman, the first person from the United Kingdom in space (1991)

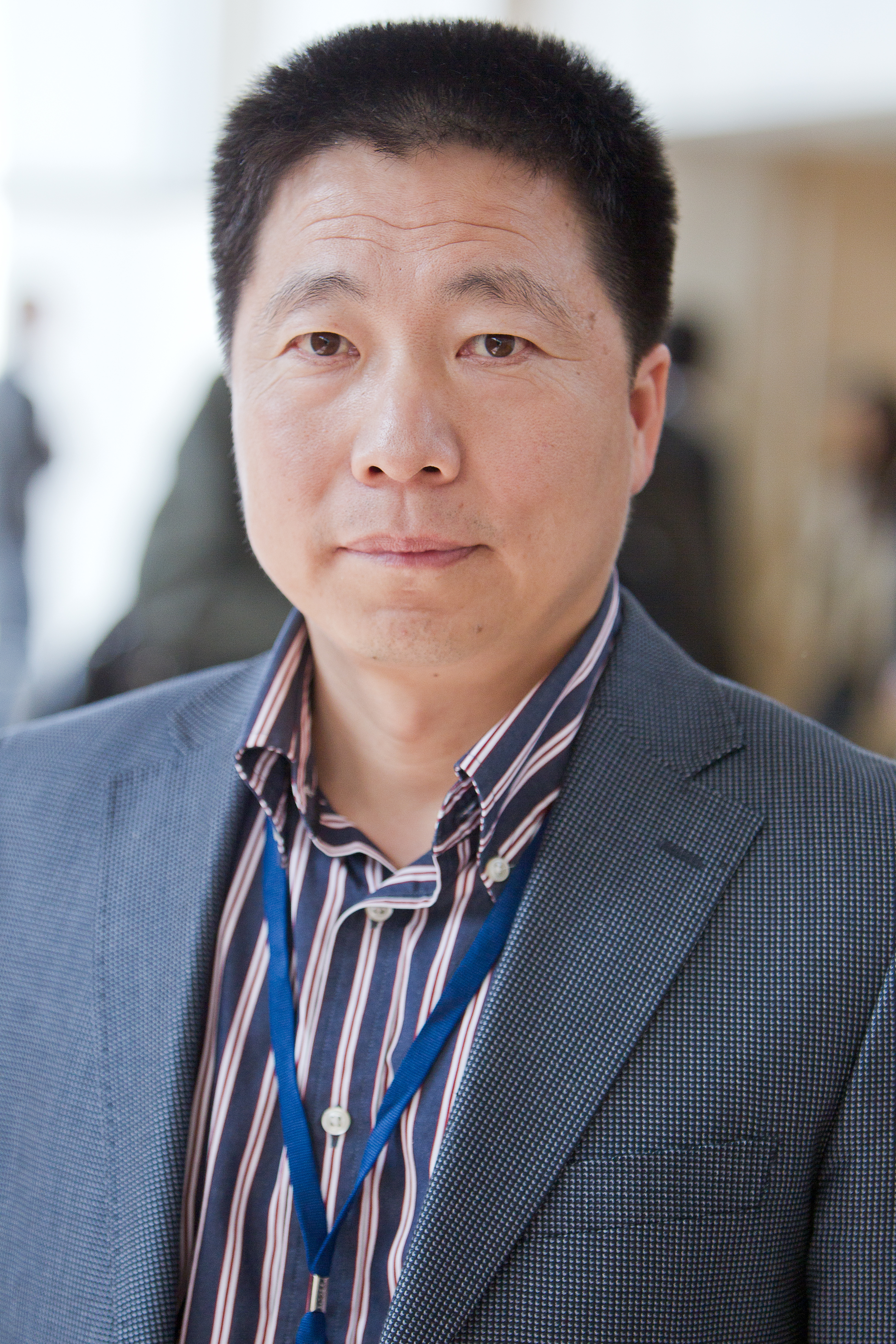
Yang Liwei of China, the third nation to launch a person into space (2003)

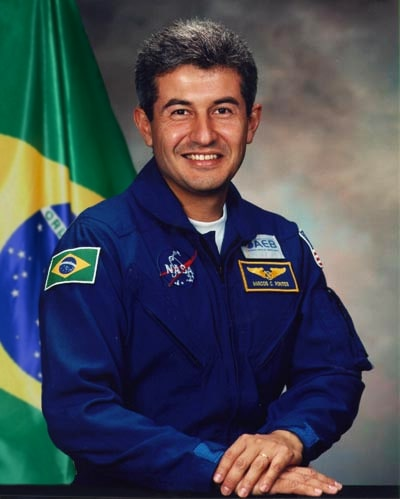
Marcos Pontes, of Brazil, the first South American and the first lusophone in space (2006)

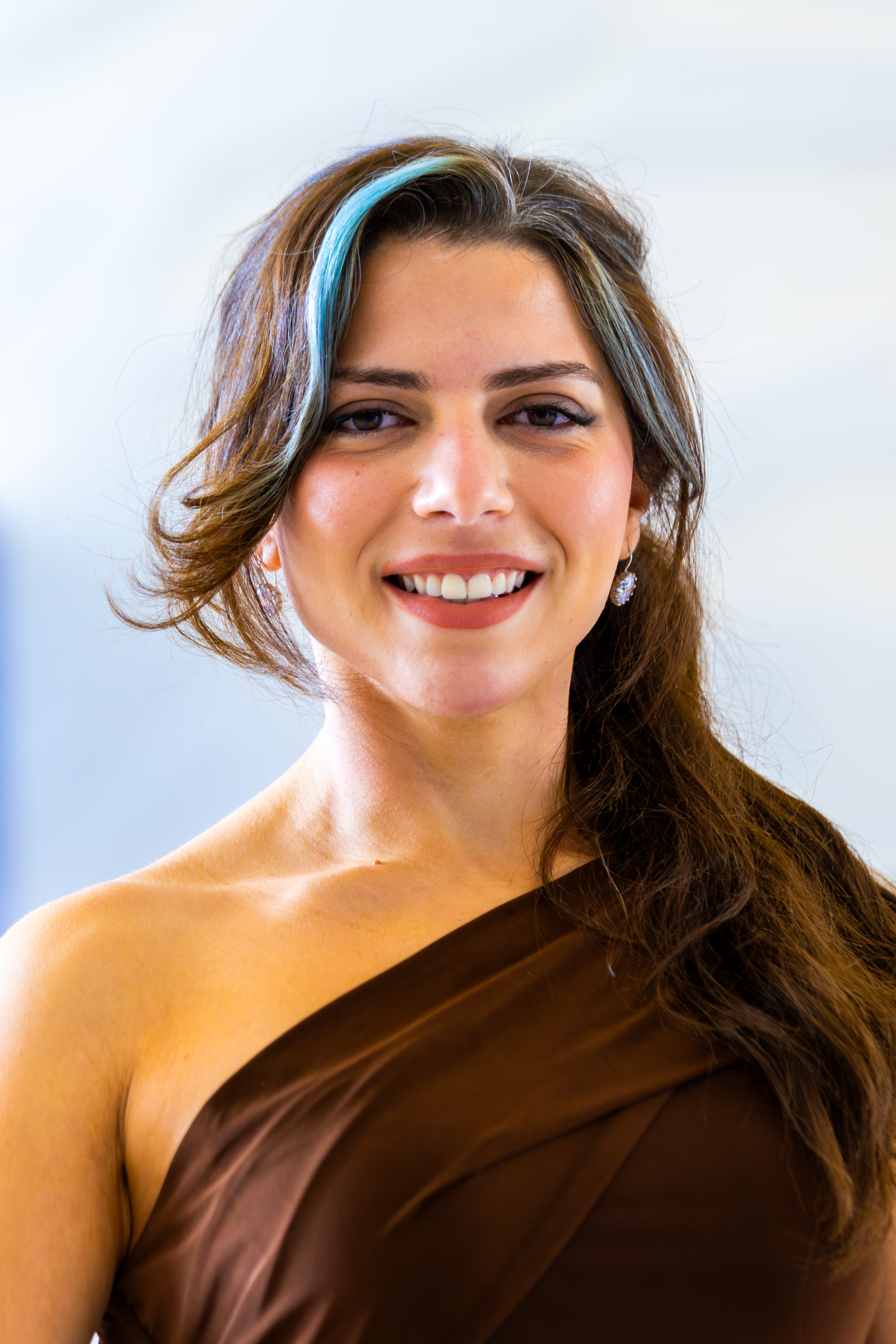
Sara Sabry, first Egyptian astronaut (2022)
