= Space traveller (disambiguation) =

A space traveller is a person who travels into or through outer space.

Space traveller may also refer to:

- Astronaut, a professional space traveller
- Space tourist, unofficial term for a non-professional space traveller
- Spaceflight participant, official term for a non-professional space traveller
