= Soyuz TMA-11 =

2007 Russian crewed spaceflight to the ISS

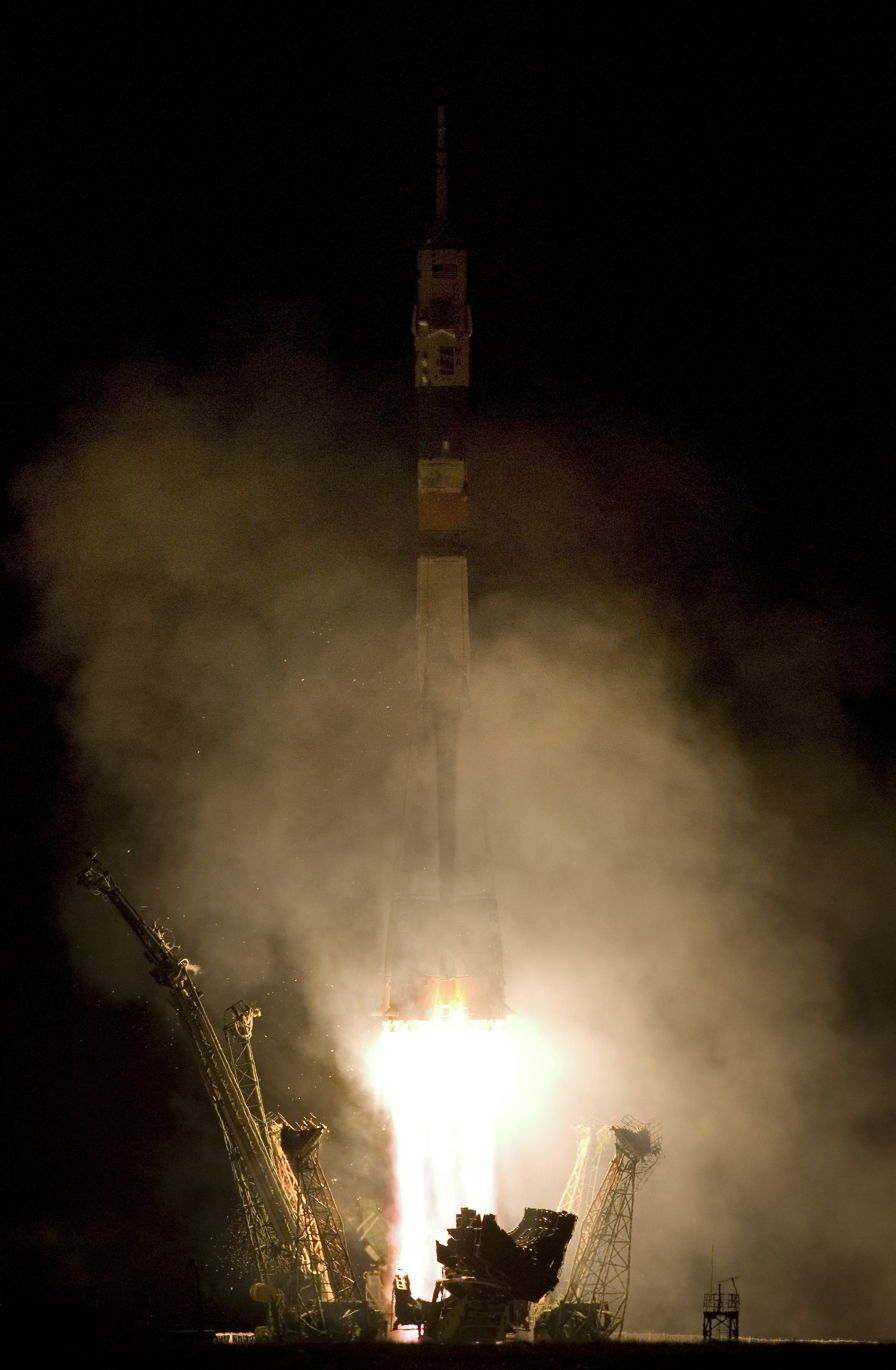
- Operator: Roscosmos
- COSPAR ID: 2007-045A
- SATCAT no.: 32256
- Mission duration: 191 days, 19 hours, 17 minutes

Spacecraft properties
- Spacecraft type: Soyuz-TMA 11F732
- Manufacturer: Energia

Crew
- Crew size: 3
- Members: Yuri Malenchenko; Peggy A. Whitson
- Launching: Sheikh Muszaphar Shukor
- Landing: Yi So-Yeon

Start of mission
- Launch date: October 10, 2007, 13:22:39 UTC
- Rocket: Soyuz-FG
- Launch site: Baikonur 1/5

End of mission
- Landing date: April 19, 2008, 08:30 UTC

Orbital parameters
- Reference system: Geocentric
- Regime: Low Earth
- Inclination: 51.6 degrees

Docking with ISS
- Docking port: Zarya
- Docking date: 12 October 2007; 14:50 UTC
- Undocking date: 19 April 2008; 05:06 UTC
- Time docked: 189d 14h 16m
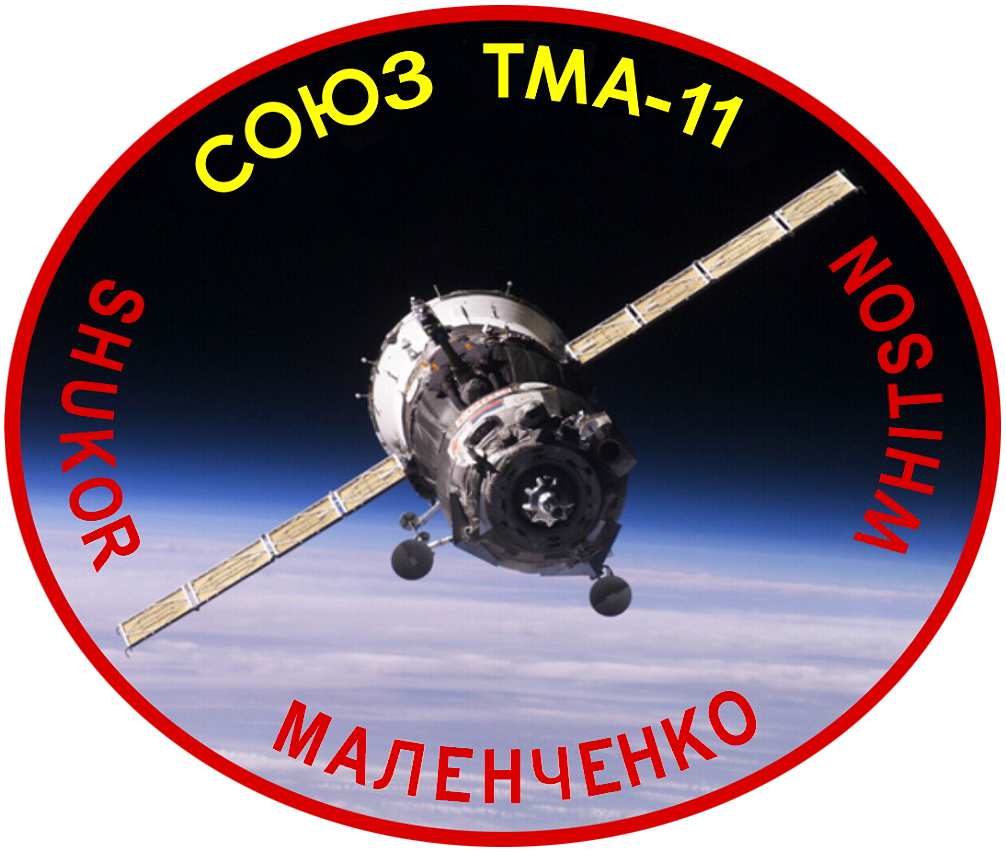
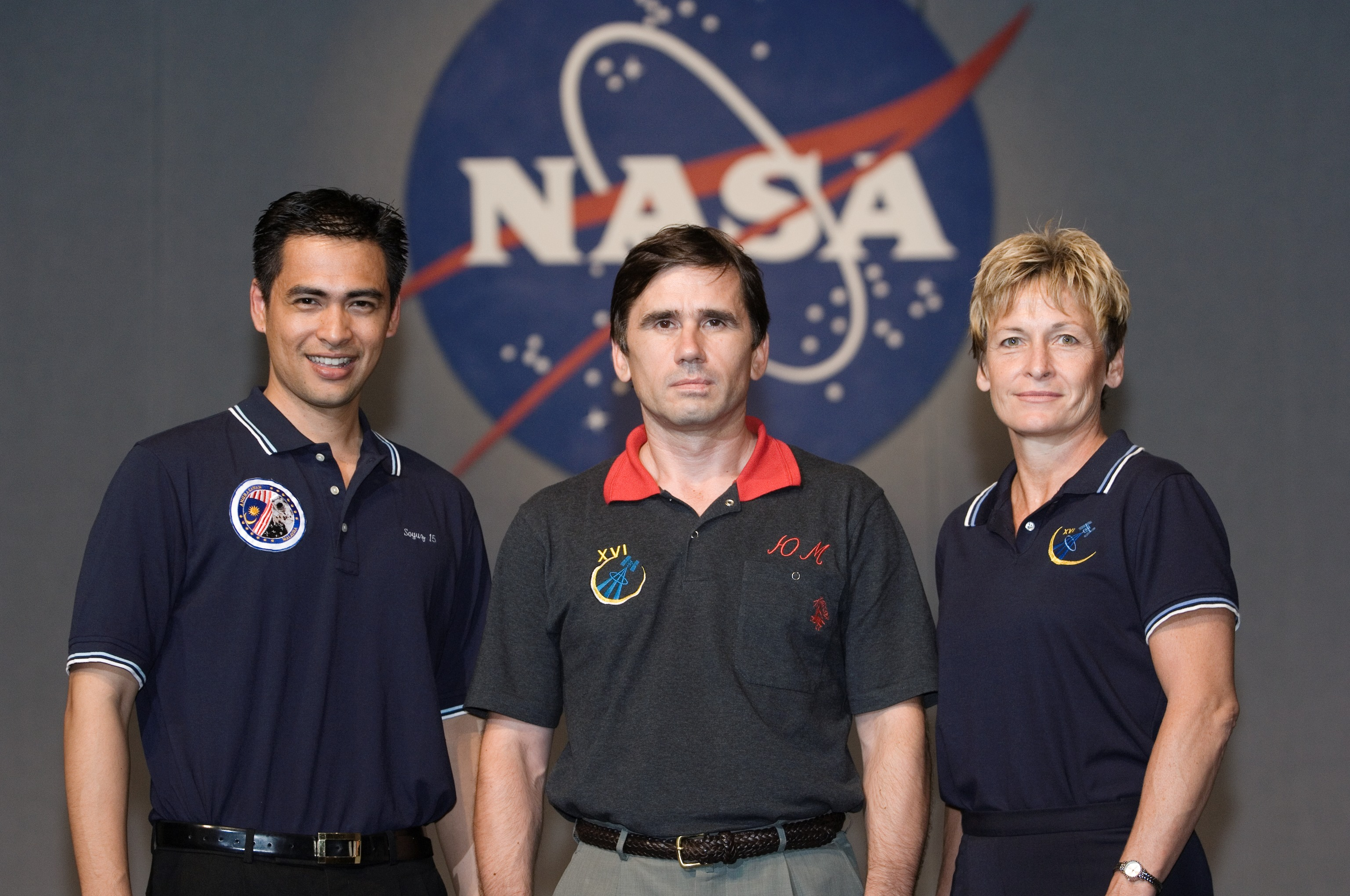
- From left to right: Sheikh Muszaphar Shukor, Yuri Malenchenko, Peggy Whitson Soyuz programme (Crewed missions)

Soyuz TMA-11 was a human spaceflight mission using a Soyuz-TMA spacecraft to transport personnel to and from the International Space Station (ISS). The mission began at 13:22 UTC on October 10, 2007, when the spacecraft was launched from the Baikonur Cosmodrome by a Soyuz FG launch vehicle. It brought to the station two members of the ISS Expedition 16 crew, as well as Sheikh Muszaphar, the first Malaysian in space. TMA-11 remained at the station as an escape craft, and returned safely to Earth on April 19, 2008, after it had been replaced by Soyuz TMA-12. Although the vehicle landed safely, it suffered a partial separation failure which caused a ballistic re-entry that in turn caused it to land 475 km from the intended landing point.

== Crew ==
Position	Launching crew	Landing crew
Commander	(Russia) Yuri Malenchenko, Roscosmos; Expedition 16; Fourth spaceflight	
Flight Engineer	(United States) Peggy Whitson, NASA; Expedition 16; Second spaceflight	
Spaceflight Participant	(Malaysia) Sheikh Muszaphar Shukor, ANGKASA; Only spaceflight	(South Korea) Yi So-Yeon, KAP; Only spaceflight

=== Backup crew ===
Position	Launching crew	Landing crew
Commander	(Russia) Salizhan Sharipov, Roscosmos	
Flight Engineer	(United States) Michael Fincke, NASA	
Spaceflight Participant	(Malaysia) Faiz Khaleed, ANGKASA	(South Korea) Ko San, KAP

=== Crew notes ===
Sheikh Muszaphar flew as a guest of the Russian government. Under this program, in exchange for the multi-billion purchase of fighter jets by Malaysia, the Russian Federation bore the cost of training two Malaysians for space travel and for sending one to the ISS.

Sheikh Muszaphar's role aboard the Soyuz is referred to as a Spaceflight Participant in English-language Russian Federal Space Agency and NASA documents and press briefings. This caused some confusion among the public, since the term Spaceflight Participant is also used for space tourists. Speaking to Malaysian media outlets, Alexander Karchava, the Russian ambassador to Malaysia, stated that Sheikh Muszaphar is a "fully-fledged cosmonaut". In an interview with the Malaysian Star newspaper, Robert Gibson, a retired NASA astronaut, shared his opinion that Sheikh Muszaphar is fully qualified as an astronaut, and as such, he should be called one. Gibson also said he regarded Sheikh Muszaphar as a peer.

== Mission highlights ==
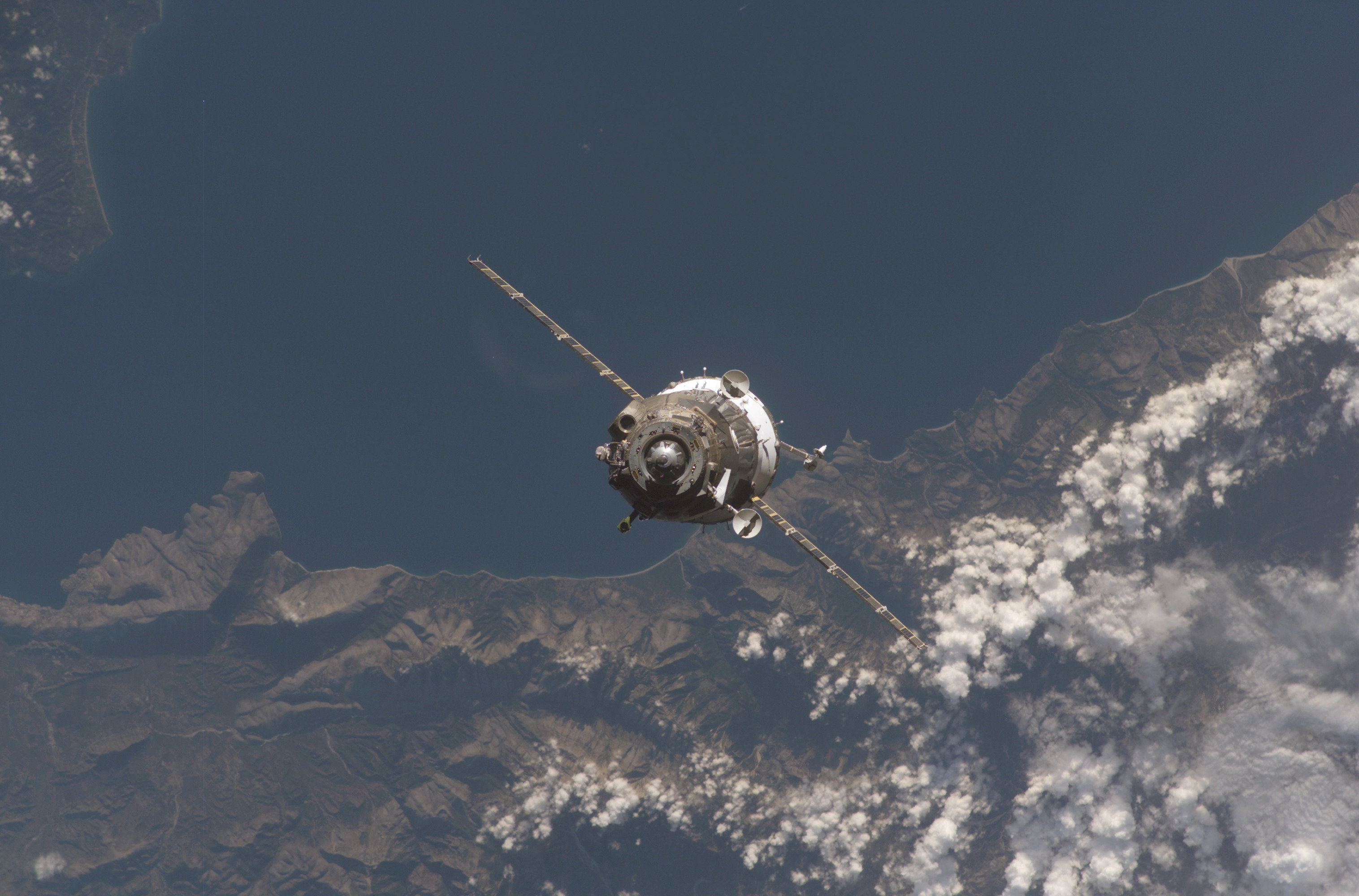
Soyuz TMA-11 spacecraft approaches the International Space Station.

The launch, which took place at 13:22 UTC (5:22 p.m. Moscow time) on October 10, 2007, "Went off successfully and without a hitch" according to a Russian official. In Malaysia, crowds in the capital city of Kuala Lumpur cheered as they watched the live launch broadcast on television sets in Dataran Merdeka (Independence Square). The giant screen originally set up for this purpose failed to function properly.

The Soyuz TMA-11 docking to the ISS occurred at 14:50 UTC on October 12, 2007.

=== Ballistic reentry ===
The spacecraft landed in Kazakhstan on April 19, 2008. Similar to Soyuz TMA-1 / Expedition 6 and Soyuz TMA-10 / Expedition 15, the Soyuz performed a ballistic reentry, a reentry steeper than a normal reentry, due to a malfunction and landed 475 km from the intended landing point. This was the second such event in a row for Soyuz TMA. Although the crew were recovered with no serious injuries, the spacecraft's hatch and antenna suffered burn damage during the unusual reentry. Yi So-yeon was hospitalized after her return to South Korea. The South Korean Science Ministry stated that the astronaut had a minor injury to her neck muscles and had bruised her spinal column. The Russian news agency Interfax reported the ship may have entered the atmosphere hatch-first.

Anatoly Perminov, the head of the Russian Federal Space Agency, speculated that the ballistic reentry was connected to a Russian nautical superstition that having more women than men on a craft was unlucky. The return flight of Soyuz TMA-11 was the first time two women flew together on board a Soyuz, and it was the first time women outnumbered men aboard a spacecraft since Valentina Tereshkova's solo flight in 1963. "This isn't discrimination," Perminov stated when challenged on the point. "I'm just saying that when a majority [of the crew] is female, sometimes certain kinds of unsanctioned behaviour or something else occurs." Perminov said he would try to ensure that the number of women would not exceed the number of men in the future.

On May 24, 2008, the Russian Federal Space Agency announced that it had determined that during reentry, the spacecraft's service module did not separate as a result of one of five pyro-bolts malfunctioning, so it entered the atmosphere nose-first. As the craft aerobraked, the service module was eventually detached, allowing the remaining descent module to flip around 180° and place its ablative heat shield towards the peak heating. The root cause of the pyro-bolt failure was not definitively determined, but the Russian investigation concluded that long-term exposure to the electrical environment surrounding the ISS may have damaged the firing system. A similar anomaly of a service module remaining attached during re-entry occurred during Soyuz 5 in 1969.

== See also ==
- Malaysian Angkasawan program
- Korean astronaut program
