= MYSA =

MYSA or variants may refer to:

- Mathare Youth Sports Association, in Nairobi, Kenya
- MySA, a daily news website based in San Antonio, Texas; sister organization to the San Antonio Express-News although editorially independent
- Malaysian Space Agency, the national space agency of Malaysia
- Mysa Nal, the name of the White Witch, a fictional comic book character in the DC Universe
- Mysa, a water buffalo character in The Jungle Book by Rudyard Kipling
