= Yi So-yeon =

South Korean astronaut (born 1978)

- 이소연
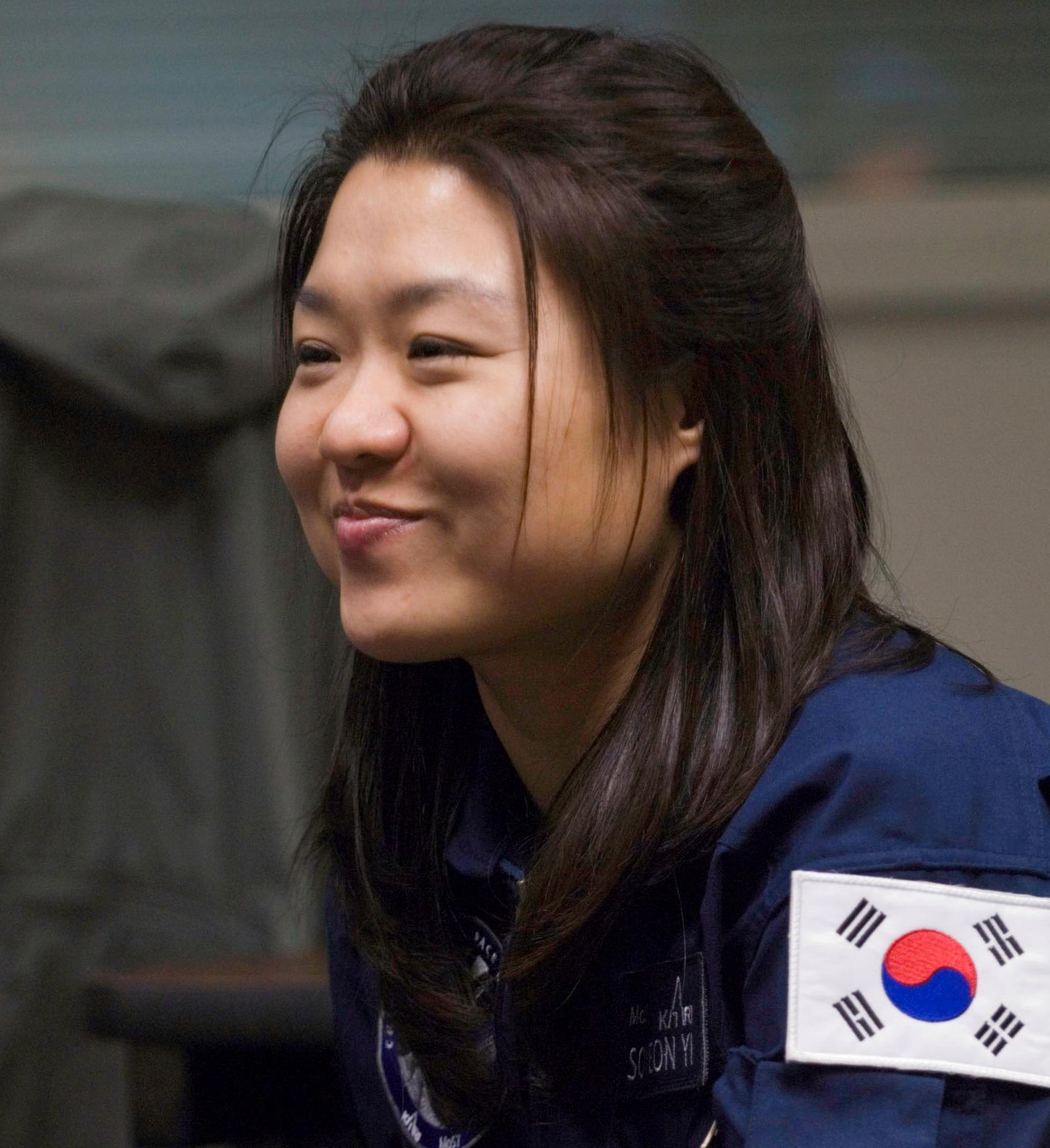
- Yi in 2008
- Born: June 2, 1978 (age 48); Gwangju, South Korea
- Occupation: Researcher
- Space career

KAP astronaut
- Time in space: 10 days, 21 hours, 13 minutes
- Selection: 2006 South Korean program
- Missions: Soyuz TMA-12/TMA-11

- Korean name
- Hangul: 이소연
- Hanja: 李素妍
- RR: I Soyeon
- MR: I Soyŏn
- IPA: [i so.jʌn]

Yi So-yeon (Korean: 이소연, born June 2, 1978) is a South Korean astronaut and biotechnologist who became the first South Korean to fly into space.

Yi was born and raised in Gwangju, South Korea and graduated from KAIST with a Master's degree in Mechanical Engineering. In 2006, she was selected as one of two finalists for the Korean Astronaut Program: a mission to send the first Koreans into space. A year later, it was announced that she was to be the backup candidate. However, on March 10, 2008, it was announced that she would be the primary one. On April 8, 2008, she was launched into space alongside two Russian cosmonauts. She spent around eleven days in space; on April 19, she returned to Earth.

Afterwards, Yi worked as a researcher at the Korea Aerospace Research Institute (KARI). She then attended the International Space University before resigning from KARI to pursue an MBA at the University of California, Berkeley Haas School of Business. She then moved to Washington and began teaching at Everett Community College and the University of Washington.

== Biography ==
Yi So-yeon's father is Yi Gil-soo and her mother is Jeong Geum-soon. She was raised in Gwangju, South Korea.

Yi studied at Gwangju Science High School. She then earned her bachelor's and master's degrees at KAIST with a focus on mechanics. Her doctorate in biotech systems was conferred on February 29, 2008, in a ceremony at KAIST though she could not attend due to her training commitments in Russia. In 2010, she started an MBA program at the Haas School of Business at the University of California, Berkeley. In 2015 she was hired to teach engineering and physics at Everett Community College in Washington State.

== Space career ==
=== Korean astronaut program ===
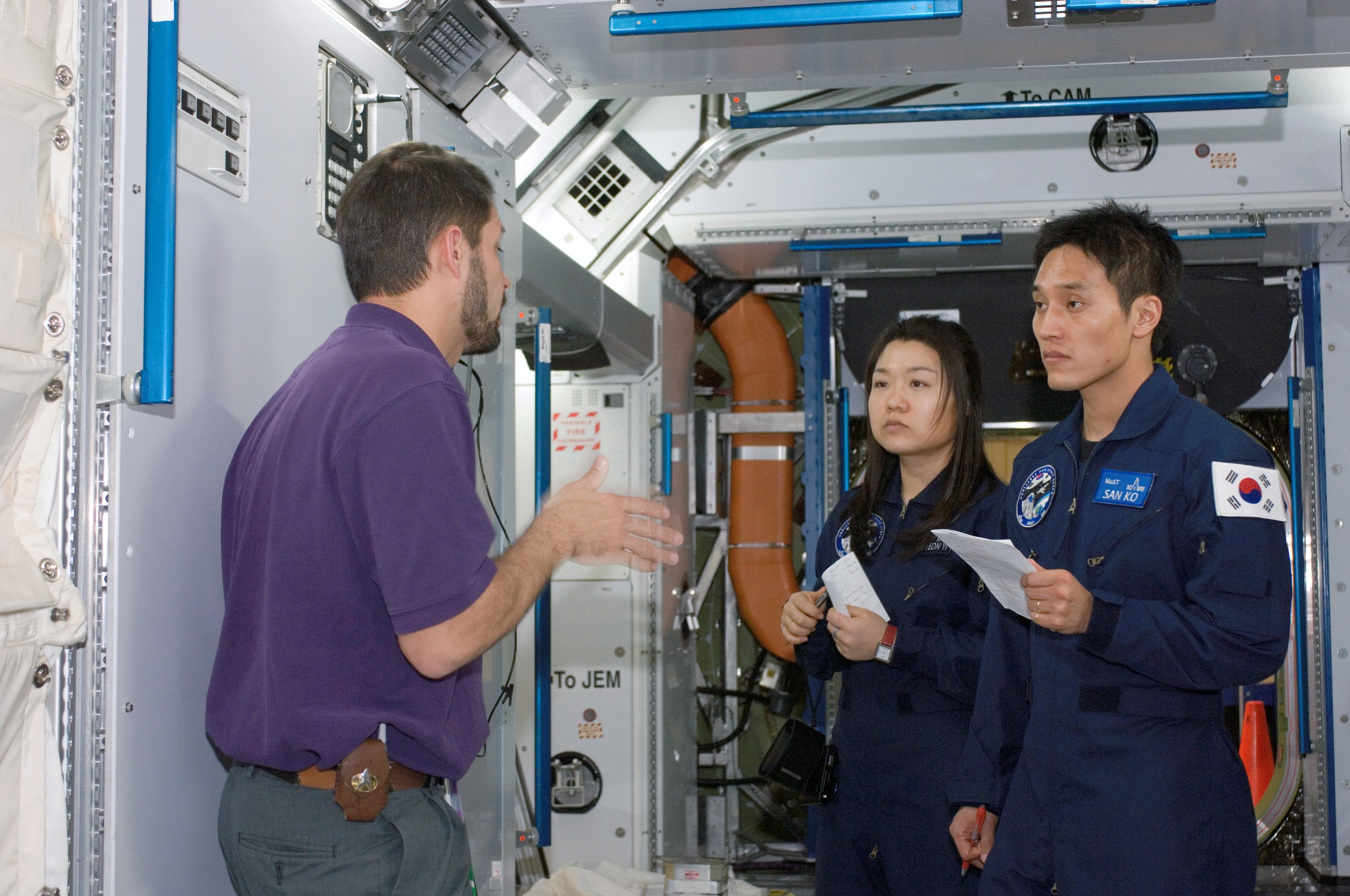
Yi So-yeon and Ko San participate in a space station hardware training session in the Space Vehicle Mockup Facility at the Johnson Space Center by Crew Systems instructor Glenn Johnson.

Yi was one of the two finalists chosen on December 25, 2006 in the Korean Astronaut Program. On September 5, 2007, the Korean Ministry of Science and Technology selected Ko San as the primary astronaut, and Yi So-yeon as the backup, following performance and other tests during their training in Russia.

A change was made on March 7, 2008, when Yi was selected to train with the primary crew, which decision was confirmed by the Ministry of Education, Science and Technology announced on March 10. This was after the Russian Federal Space Agency requested a replacement because Ko violated regulations several times at a Russian training center by removing sensitive reading materials and mailing some of the reading materials back to Korea. On April 8, 2008, Yi was launched into space on board Soyuz TMA-12 with two Russian cosmonauts. South Korea is reported to have paid Russia $20 million for Yi's space flight. She is the third woman, after Helen Sharman of the United Kingdom and Anousheh Ansari an Iranian American, to be the first national from their country in space.

==== Terminology ====
Flying as a guest of the Russian government through a commercial agreement with South Korea, Yi's role aboard Soyuz and the ISS was referred to as a spaceflight participant (Russian: uchastnik kosmicheskovo poleta) in Russian Federal Space Agency and NASA documents and press briefings.

=== Mission ===
During her mission, Yi So-yeon carried out eighteen science experiments for KARI and conducted interviews and discussions with media. One aspect of her work involved bringing 1,000 fruit flies in a special air-conditioned container box (Konkuk University experiment). She monitored the way gravitational changes and other changes in environmental conditions altered the behaviour of the flies or their genome. Other experiments involved the growth of plants in space, the study of the behaviour of her heart, and the effects of gravitational changes on pressure in her eyes and the shape of her face. With a specially designed three-dimensional Samsung camera, Yi took six shots of her face every day to see how it swelled in different gravitational conditions. She further observed the Earth, and the movement of dust storms from China to Korea.She also measured the noise levels on board the ISS.

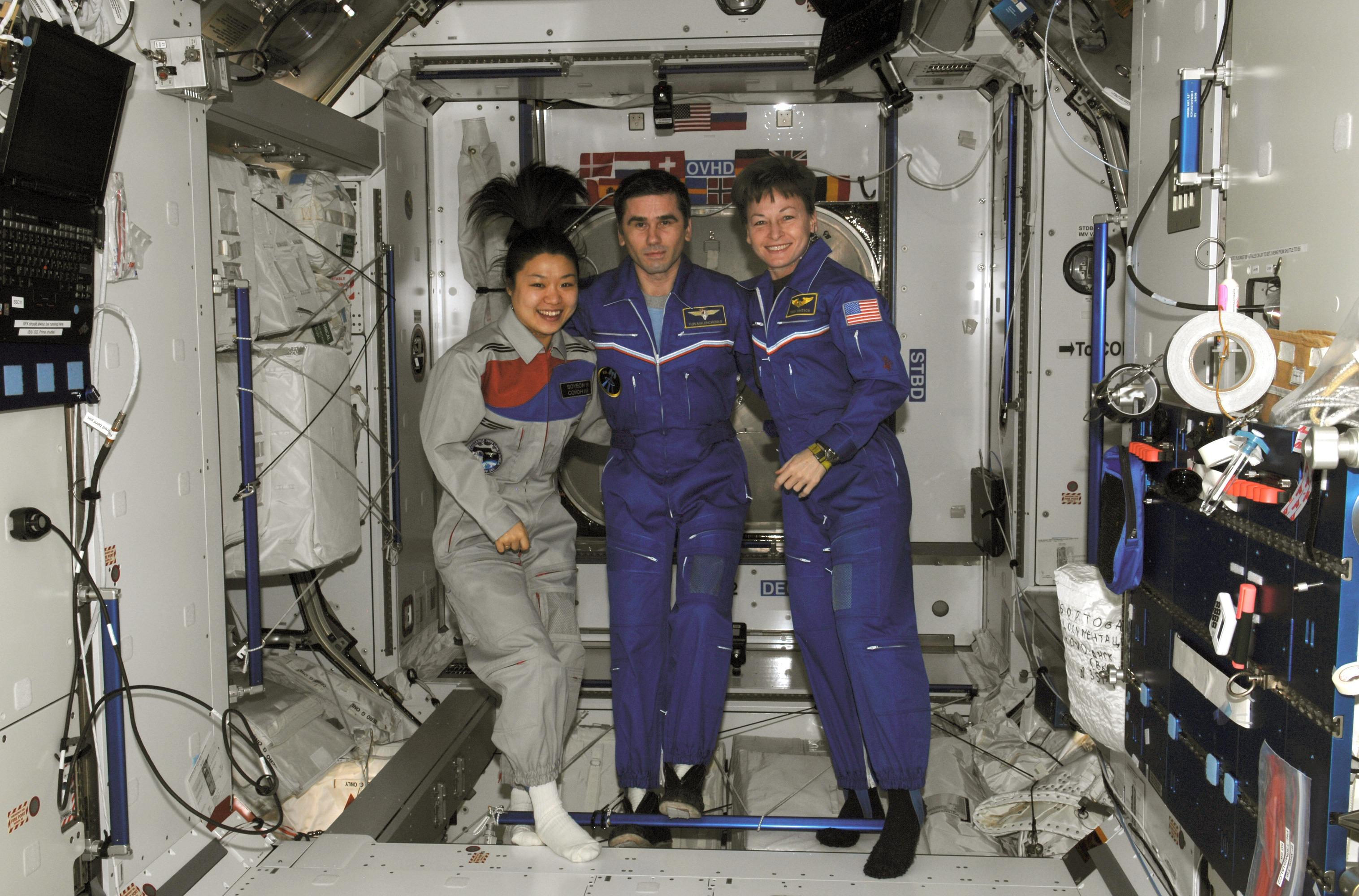
Yi So-yeon with NASA astronaut Peggy Whitson (right), Expedition 16 commander, and Russian Federal Space Agency cosmonaut Yuri Malenchenko (middle), flight engineer, at the International Space Station.

South Korean scientists created a special low-calorie and vitamin-rich version of kimchi for Yi.

=== Return flight ===
At the end of the mission, Yi returned to Earth along with ISS crew members Peggy Whitson and Yuri Malenchenko aboard Soyuz TMA-11, on April 19, 2008. Due to a malfunction with the Soyuz, the craft followed a ballistic re-entry which subjected the crew to severe gravitational forces up to 10 times the amount experienced on Earth. As a result of the re-entry, the TMA-11 craft used in the return flight landed 420 kilometres (260 mi) off-course from its target in Kazakhstan. All three survived, although they required medical observation upon landing. Yi was hospitalized after her return to Korea due to severe back pains.

=== Post-flight ===
Post space flight, Yi worked as a researcher at KARI and as Korea's space ambassador with Ko San. She received income from subsequent TV commercials. On October 4, 2008, Yi launched the International Institute of Space Commerce at a ceremony held in Douglas, Isle of Man.

In 2009, Yi became the first astronaut to attend the International Space University (ISU) Space Studies Program (SSP) at NASA Ames Research Center, held in conjunction with the inaugural class of the Singularity University (SU) Graduate Studies Program (GSP).

Based on her early career success, Yi was listed as one of the Fifteen Asian Scientists To Watch by Asian Scientist Magazine in May 2011.

== Career after flight ==
On August 13, 2014, the Korean Aerospace Research Institute announced Yi's resignation for personal reasons. In an interview, she said she resigned to study for an MBA.

After receiving her MBA from the University of California, Berkeley Haas School of Business, Yi joined the Association of Spaceflight Professionals. She has lived in Washington state, United States and taught physics at the Everett Community College in Washington, United States since 2016. She has also lectured at the University of Washington. In 2021, she was selected as a Karman Project Fellow for her work in space.

== See also ==
- Timeline of space travel by nationality
- ARISS (Amateur Radio on the International Space Station)
