= Malaysian Remote Sensing Agency =

- Agensi Remote Sensing Malaysia

Agency overview
- Abbreviation: MRSA
- Formed: 1988
- Superseding agency: MYSA
- Type: Space agency
- Status: Merged with National Space Agency (ANGKASA)
- Headquarters: Kuala Lumpur
- Owner: Malaysia

The Malaysian Remote Sensing Agency (Malay: Agensi Remote Sensing Malaysia), abbreviated MRSA or ARSM, was a department responsible for remote sensing under the Ministry of Science, Technology and Innovation (Malaysia). On 20 February 2019, the Malaysian Cabinet had approved the merging of the Malaysian Remote Sensing Agency (MRSA) and National Space Agency (ANGKASA) to establish the Malaysian Space Agency (MYSA).

== Background ==
Malaysian Centre of Remote Sensing (MACRES) or Pusat Remote Sensing Negara was established in August 1988 as a research and development centre in remote sensing and related technologies. It was recognised as a federal institute of research in the field of remote sensing and related technologies. On 15 February 2008, MACRES was upgraded as a full government department and known as Malaysian Remote Sensing Agency (MRSA). MRSA started with a team of 17 professionals and supporting staff. By 2018, the total post has been increased to 226 professionals.

== Facilities ==
MRSA is equipped with computer system for satellite data image processing, geographic information system and global positioning system, a satellite ground receiving station for real time data acquisition, microwave remote sensing laboratory (anechoic chamber, mobile scatterometer), remote sensing digital photographic laboratory and remote sensing data archiving and retrieval centre.

== Organisation structure ==
- Director General
  - Management Division
  - Strategic and Public Relations Directorate
  - Deputy Director General (Research and Development)
    - Remote Sensing Application Development Division
    - Geospatial Data Development and Analysis Division
    - Sensor System Development Division
  - Deputy Director General (Technical Services)
    - Remote Sensing Data Processing and Distribution Division
    - Geospatial ICT Management Division
    - Remote Sensing Data Reception Division

== Major programme ==
There are two main programme in MRSA:

=== Research and development (R&D) ===
The R&D programme involves research on remote sensing, GIS and related technology applications in the field of agriculture, natural resources, environment, disaster, national security as well as management of land development. It also focuses on spatial data analysis and GIS modelling, computer system and sensors and provide technical advice on the use of remote sensing technology in the country.

=== Technical services ===
Technical Services is focused on maintaining the operation and services or MRSA as a one stop centre in remote sensing technology.

== Services offered by MRSA ==
MRSA accepts application for satellite remote sensing data for 3 categories:

- Non-restricted Remote Sensing Satellite Images for image resolution of more than 5m
- Restricted Remote Sensing Satellite Images
- Free Remote Sensing Satellite Images under the Category of Research and Education

Further information and application forms can be downloaded here.

The Remote Sensing Data Web Catalogue can be accessed here.

== See also ==
- Malaysian Space Agency (MYSA)
- National Space Agency (ANGKASA)
