= Angkasawan programme =

Malaysian government initiative

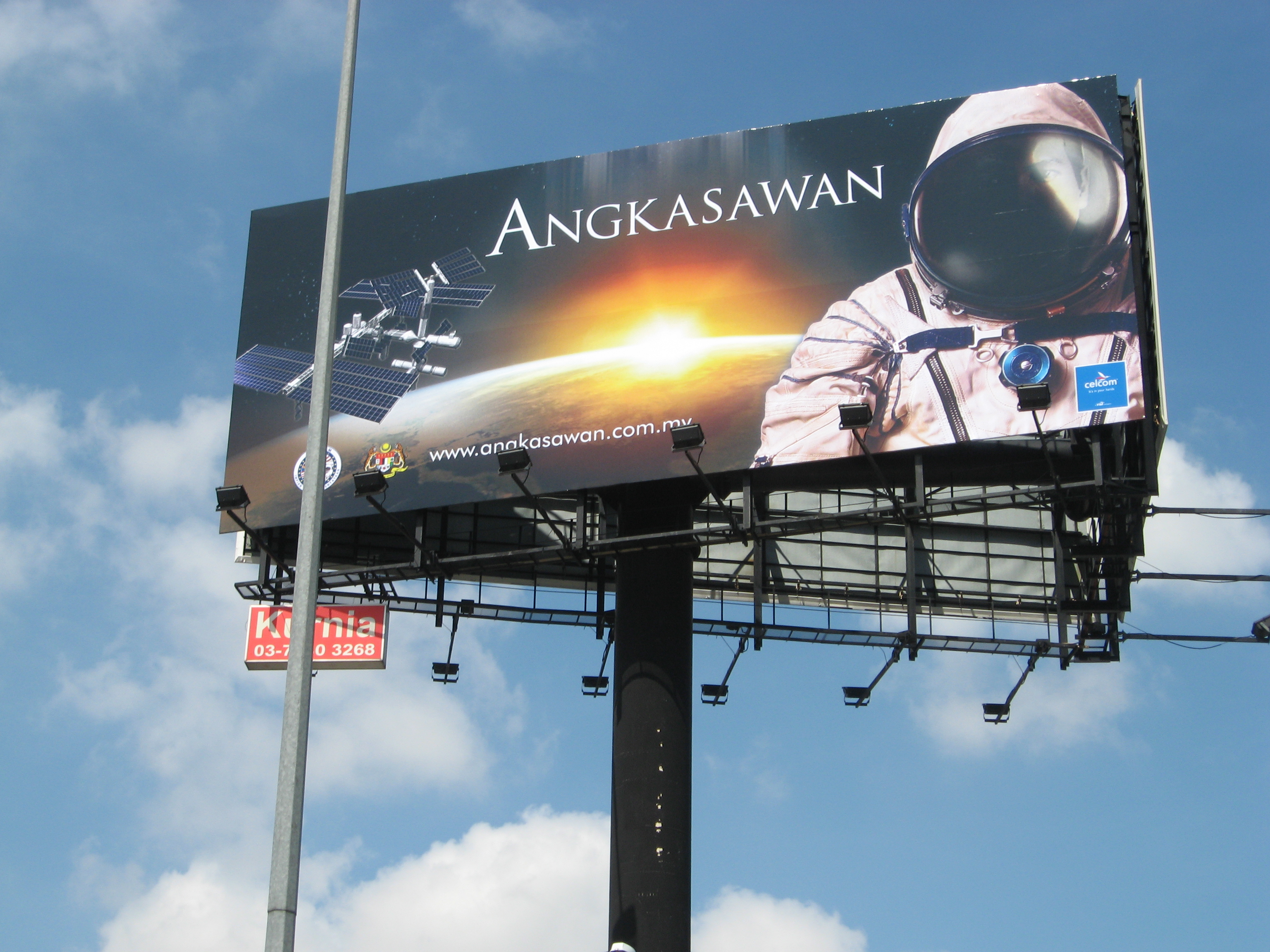
- A billboard advertising the Angkasawan program

Program overview
- Country: Malaysia / Russia
- Organisation: National Space Agency (ANGKASA)
- Purpose: Astronaut training

The Angkasawan programme was an initiative by the Malaysian government to send a Malaysian to the International Space Station on board Soyuz TMA-11. The programme was named after the Malay word for astronaut, Angkasawan. It resulted in Sheikh Muszaphar Shukor becoming the first Malaysian in space.

== Background and objectives ==
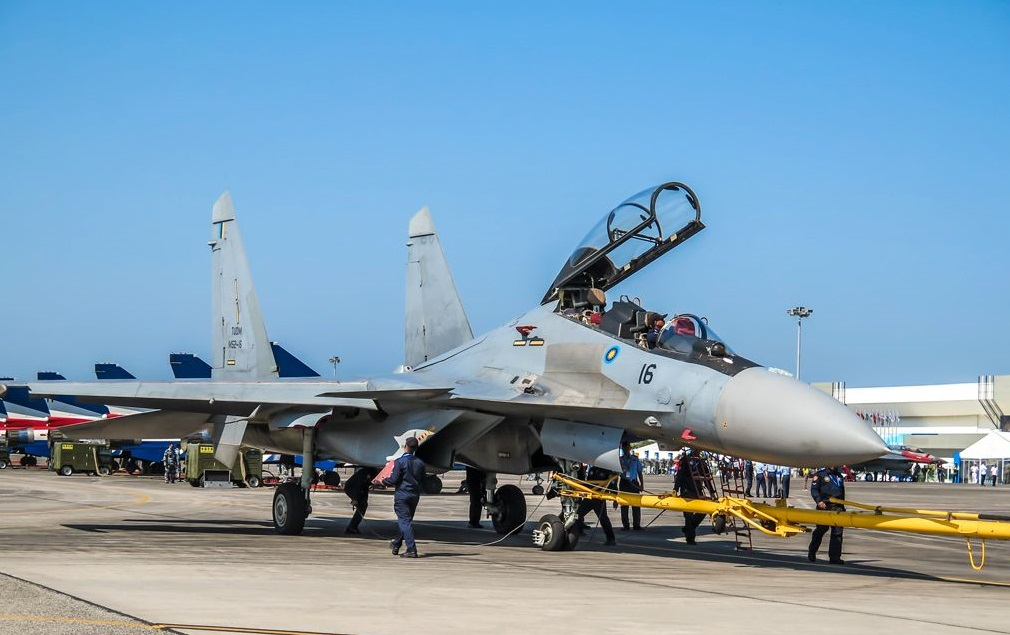
Russian Federation bore the cost for the training of Malaysian astronaut for the purchase of 18 Sukhoi Su-30MKM fighter jets.

The programme was officially announced by Prime Minister of Malaysia, Mahathir Mohamad as a project under the offset agreement with the Russian Government through the purchase of Sukhoi Su-30MKM fighter jets for the Royal Malaysian Air Force. Under this agreement, the Russian Federation bore the cost of training two Malaysians for space travel and for sending one to the International Space Station (ISS) in October 2007.

The National Space Agency (ANGKASA), Ministry of Science, Technologies and Innovations was given the responsibility of selecting the candidates. Two candidates were then sent to the Cosmonaut Training Programme in Star City, Russia for 18 months of training.

The government set the main objectives of the programme as uplifting the national image and instilling in the younger generation greater interest in mathematics and science. At the launch, the Malaysian Science, Technology and Innovation Minister Jamaluddin Jarjis said: "It is not merely a project to send a Malaysian into space. After 50 years of independence, we need a new shift and a new advantage to be more successful as a nation. "We want to awe and inspire, and spur Malaysians to attain greater success by embracing science and technology." The space programme is part of the Ninth Malaysia Plan which also included 217 space science research activities conducted by various universities and agencies in Malaysia.

Later, Jamaluddin Jarjis was more specific as to the objective of the program when he said that it "was to create awareness among Malaysians the importance of science, technology and the space industry, which could help develop the economy further."

Sheikh Muszaphar Shukor himself said that "I am not seeking fame or looking forward to be welcomed like a celebrity, but my quest is to inspire Malaysians, especially schoolchildren to like learning the subject of science and the space industry."

== Selection ==
Selection of the astronaut was done in 9 stages:

Stage	Date	Activities
1 and 2	27 August and 3 September 2005	Selected 435 candidates out of 11,000 applicants took part in a 3.5km run that must be completed within 20 minutes at RMAF Subang Air Base. Finishing the run was strictly mandatory to advance; those who passed had to immediately report to Sultan Idris Shah Serdang Hospital within two hours for further medical screening, while slower candidates were cut on the spot. Eventually, 194 people passed first stage, while only 59 people passed the second stage.
3 and 4	25 and 30 September 2005	Aeromedical Test 1 (including blood, nose & ear, X-ray, heart (ECG) test) was done at the Sultan Idris Shah Serdang Hospital. 59 candidates were tested with 27 passed. Aeromedical Test 2 (including bone, air passage and centrifuge test) was done at the Subang Air Base Institute of Aviation Medicine (IAM). 27 candidates were tested with 18 passed.
5 and 6	From 14 to 26 January 2006	The 18 finalists were then sent to the Lumut Naval Base, to train with the elite PASKAL commandos. After further Medical Examinations (including CT Scan, endoscopy and blood analysis), just 8 finalists remained.
7	February 2006	The candidates faced formal interviews.

=== Stage 8 and 9 ===
On 14 March 2006 at the RMAF base, Deputy Prime Minister Najib Razak formally announced the four finalists:

- Siva Vanajah, 45
- Mohammed Faiz Kamaludin, 44
- Faiz Khaleed, 36
- Sheikh Muszaphar Shukor, 44

They were sent to Russia for medical examinations. On 4 September 2006, Prime Minister Tun Abdullah Ahmad Badawi announced that Sheikh Muszaphar Shukor and Faiz Khaleed had been chosen to undergo 18 months of intensive training at the Yuri Gagarin Cosmonauts Training Center.

=== Prelude and Launch ===
On 23 July 2007, Sheikh Muszaphar participated in a NASA news conference with the Expedition 16 crew. Faiz Khaleed served as backup to Sheikh Muszaphar.

Sheikh Muszaphar Shukor was launched on Soyuz TMA-11 on 10 October 2007 and became the first Malaysian in space. He returned on Soyuz TMA-10 after a ten-day stay on the ISS.

== Experiments ==
#	Experiment	Code	Description
1	Cells in Space	CIS	Study of the effects of microgravity and space radiation on eukaryotic cells focusing on changes in the structure and function at the cellular and molecular levels
2	Microbes in Space	MIS	Study of the effects of microgravity on motility of bacteria, drug resistances as well as changes in gene expression (using the microarray approach). Expect to show some effects of bacterial growth using a pre-determined minimum inhibitory concentration (MIC).
3	Protein Crystallisation in Space	PCS	The purpose of this experiment is to compare the crystal growth of lipases on Earth with that grown in microgravity. Several test conditions will also be tested to improve the protein crystallisation process on Earth as well as in space.
4	Malaysian Food in Space	FIS	Increase the variety and quality of food available to space travellers by identifying new food items (specifically typical Malaysian dishes) that are appropriate for consumption during space flight.
5	Study of spinning motions in microgravity environment	TOP	A physics demonstration to show the effect of microgravity on the motions of spinning object using a top.
6	PR and Symbolics	PAS	PR and Symbolics activities.

On 15 November 2006, in a response to a question in the Dewan Rakyat, Agriculture and Agro-based Industry Ministry parliamentary secretary Rohani Abdul Karim (representing the Science, Technology and Innovation Ministry) stated that the Malaysian astronaut would, "spin top and toss Batu Seremban (five-stone game) as part of an experiment during his space travel". She added, "The astronaut will also paint a batik motif and make "teh tarik" ("pulled" tea) which would be shared with his fellow astronauts".

However, on 18 December 2006, Science, Technology and Innovation Minister Jamaluddin Jarjis said that making teh tarik in space would not happen. Various experiments drawn up by selected Malaysian institutes would be carried out by the Malaysian astronaut while in zero-gravity. In the planned physics education (live class in space) portion of the spaceflight, the astronaut will also be, "demonstrating the behaviour of fluids" and "observing the effects of a spinning object", to show Malaysian students on the ground the effects of zero-gravity on selected physical phenomena.

During the mission, Sheikh Muszaphar performed experiments on board the International Space Station relating to the characteristics and growth of liver cancer and leukaemia cells, the crystallisation of various proteins and microbes in space.

The experiments relating to liver cancer, leukaemia cells and microbes were aimed at benefitting general science and medical research, while the experiments relating to the crystallisation of proteins, lipases in this case, were designed to benefit local industries. After the space programme, Malaysia continue to participate in protein research in the Japanese JAXA programme and medical research in Russian MARS-500 programme. Besides, eight patents were filed in Malaysia and abroad. Malaysia also registered a trademark named 1-RAP-NHOst (re-adapted normal human Osteoblast) which has the potential for commercialisation as of 2014.

== Criticism ==
The cost of sending Sheikh Muszaphar into space has been estimated at RM105 million (approximately US$26 million). The Malaysian space program has been criticised as a waste of money for a developing nation that could ill afford such indulgences. Officials defended the funding of the programme as part of a US$900 million defence deal struck with Moscow in 2003 to buy 18 Sukhoi Su-30MKM fighter aircraft. In 2023, Chang Lih Kang clarified that Malaysian government only spent RM 16 million in the programme, including the process of vetting for astronaut candidates, to carry out scientific missions, educational programmes, training at the National Aeronautics and Space Administration (NASA), and insurance for the astronaut. The return on value (ROV) for the government are in the form of knowledge generation, talent development, and knowledge transfer by the experts.

Numerous individuals, especially residents of Malaysia, displayed opposition and ambiguity towards Sheikh Muszaphar's title as a spaceflight participant, citing the fact that he had trained alongside his crew for spaceflight and is fully qualified, arguing that he should be considered an astronaut.
