= Sheikh Muszaphar Shukor =

Malaysian medical officer and spaceflight participant (born 1972)

Yang Berbahagia Dato' Sheikh Muszaphar Shukor
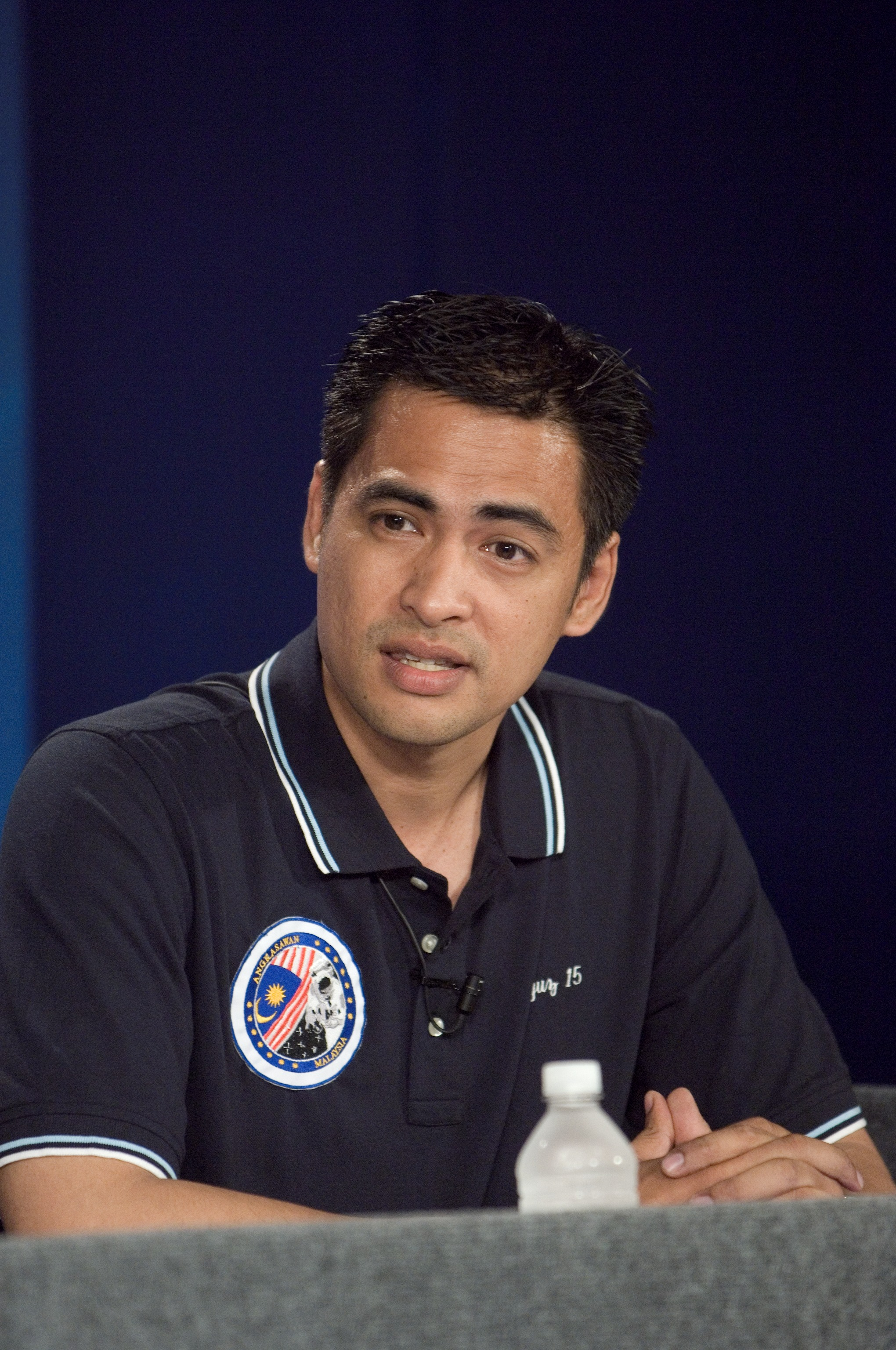
- Sheikh in 2007
- Born: Sheikh Muszaphar Shukor Al Masrie bin Sheikh Mustapha; 27 July 1972 (age 54); Kuala Lumpur, Malaysia
- Education: Manipal Academy of Higher Education (MBBS)
- Occupations: Orthopedic medical officer; model
- Years active: 1998–present
- Spouse: Halina Mohd Yunos (m. 2010)
- Children: 7
- Space career

ANGKASA astronaut
- Time in space: 10d 20h 14m
- Selection: 2006 Angkasawan program
- Missions: Soyuz TMA-11/Soyuz TMA-10
- Website: nasa.gov

Sheikh Muszaphar Shukor Al Masrie bin Sheikh Mustapha (born 27 July 1972) is a Malaysian doctor. He launched to the International Space Station aboard Soyuz TMA-11 with the Expedition 16 crew on 10 October 2007. Sheikh Muszaphar flew under an agreement with Russia through the Angkasawan program, and returned to Earth on 21 October 2007, aboard Soyuz TMA-10 with the Expedition 15 crew members, Fyodor Yurchikhin and Oleg Kotov.

== Family background ==
Shukor was born on 27 July 1972 in Kuala Lumpur, Malaysia to Sheikh Mustapha bin Abdul Shukor and Zuraidah Sheikh Ahmad. His parents are Malays with distant Egyptian roots. Muszaphar's father Mustapha was a businessman.

== Education ==
He attended high school at Maktab Rendah Sains MARA in Muar. He then earned a Bachelor of Medicine and Surgery degree from Kasturba Medical College, an affiliated college of Manipal University, in Manipal, India.

== Career ==
Sheikh Muszaphar previously worked as an orthopaedic medical officer (MO) but never completed his specialisation. at the Universiti Kebangsaan Malaysia. In 1998, Sheikh Muszaphar worked at Hospital Seremban, followed by a move to Kuala Lumpur General Hospital in 1999, and was on staff at Hospital Selayang from 2000 through 2001. Sheikh Muszaphar is also a part-time model.

== Angkasawan program ==
Sheikh Muszaphar and three other finalists were selected at the beginning of 2006 for the Malaysian Angkasawan spaceflight program. The program arose after Russia agreed to transport one Malaysian to the ISS as part of a multi-billion purchase of 18 Russian Sukhoi Su-30 MKM fighter jets by Malaysia. After completing initial training at Star City in Russia, Sheikh Muszaphar and Faiz Khaleed were selected to undergo an 18-month training program in Russia, at the end of which Sheikh Muszaphar was chosen as the prime crew member, while Faiz Khaleed served as back-up. Following the final medical tests and training examinations, on 17 September, it was announced that Sheikh Muszaphar would be flying on the Soyuz TMA-11 mission.

During a NASA news conference with the Expedition 16 crew on 23 July 2007, and news conferences following his selection, Sheikh Muszaphar said he hoped to be able to take various live cell cultures to study during his flight.

=== Terminology ===
Flying as a guest of the Russian government, Sheikh Muszaphar's role aboard Soyuz and the ISS is referred to as a spaceflight participant in English-language Russian Federal Space Agency and NASA documents and press briefings.

Speaking to Malaysian media outlets, Alexander Karchava, the Russian ambassador to Malaysia, stated that Sheikh Muszaphar is a "fully-fledged cosmonaut". In an interview with the Malaysian Star newspaper, Robert Gibson, a retired NASA astronaut, shared his opinion that Sheikh Muszaphar is fully qualified as an astronaut, and as such, he should be called one. Gibson also said he regarded Sheikh Muszaphar as a peer.

== Spaceflight ==
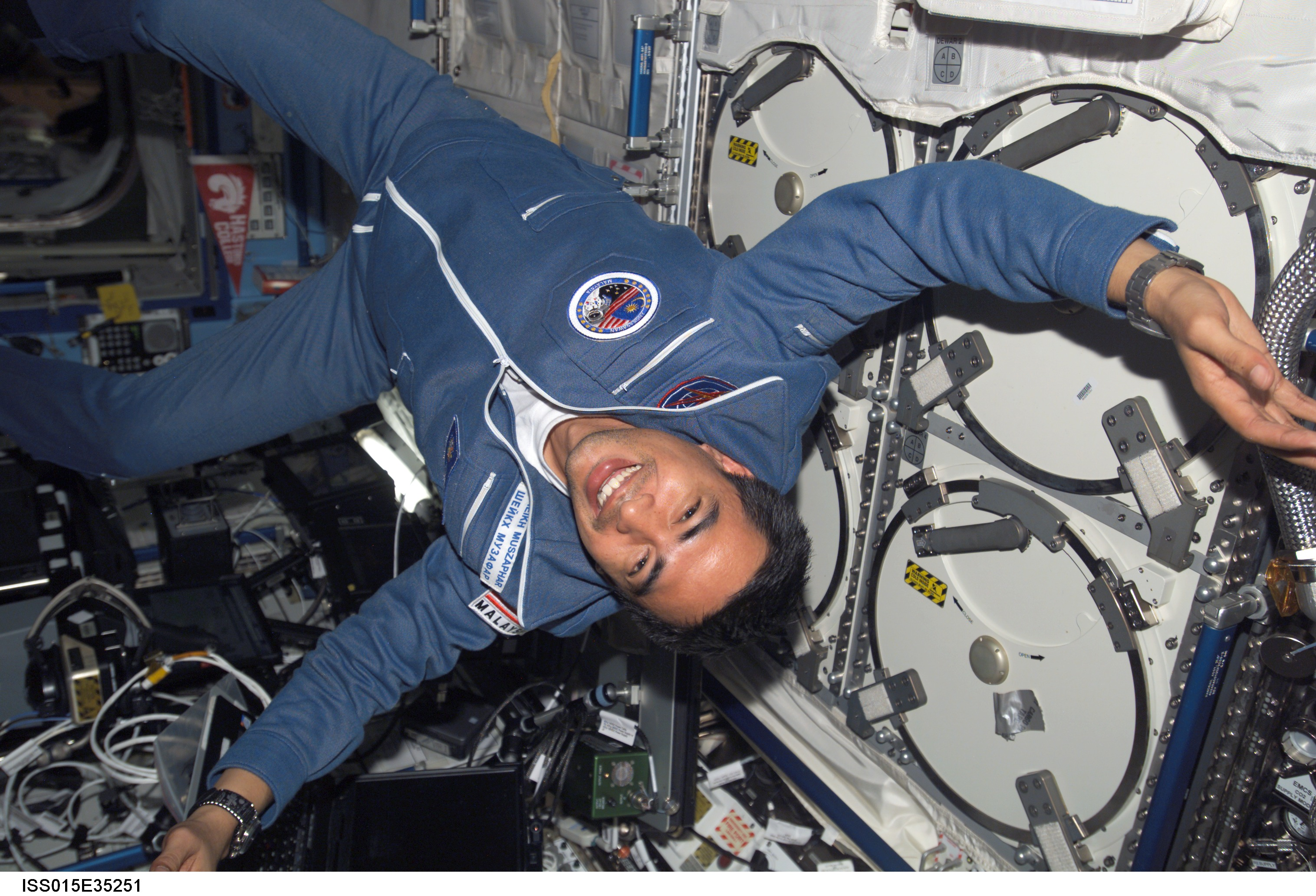
Sheikh Muszaphar Shukor in the Destiny (ISS module).

Soyuz TMA-11 carrying Yuri Malenchenko, Peggy Whitson and Sheikh Muszaphar successfully launched at 13:22 UTC, Wednesday, 10 October 2007.

After 10 days in space, Sheikh Muszaphar boarded Soyuz TMA-10 for his return. TMA-10 undocked from the ISS at 07:14 UTC on 21 October, and deorbit occurred at 09:47. During atmospheric re-entry, the spacecraft transitioned to a ballistic reentry, resulting in it landing west of Arkalyk, approximately 340 km (210 mi) northwest of the intended Kazakhstan landing site. The trajectory was reported by the crew as soon as they came out of the communications blackout caused by plasma surrounding the spacecraft. A ballistic trajectory is a backup re-entry mode that takes over if something fails during normal re-entry. A Commission of Inquiry determined that the ballistic re-entry was caused by damage to a cable in the spacecraft's control panel, which connected the control panel with the Soyuz descent equipment. Landing occurred at 10:36 GMT, the duration of his flight is 10d 20h 14m.

== Space experiments ==
Sheikh Muszaphar performed experiments on board the International Space Station relating to the characteristics and growth of liver cancer and leukaemia cells, the crystallisation of various proteins and microbes in space.

== Spaceflight and religion ==
Since Sheikh Muszaphar is a Muslim, and as his time in space coincided with the last part of Ramadan, the Islamic National Fatwa Council drew up the first comprehensive guidebook for Muslims in space. The 18-page guidebook is titled "Guidelines for Performing Islamic Rites (Ibadah) at the International Space Station", and details issues such as how to pray in a low-gravity environment, how to locate Mecca from the ISS, how to determine prayer times, and issues surrounding fasting. The orbit of the ISS results in one day/night cycle every 90 minutes, so the issues of fasting during Ramadan are also addressed. Sheikh Muszaphar celebrated Eid ul-Fitr aboard the station, and packed some satay and cookies to hand out to the rest of the crew on 13 October 2007 to mark the end of Ramadan.

== Legacy ==
In honour of Sheikh Muszaphar Shukor being the first Malaysian sent into space, the 2008 ASEAN University Games organising committee had chosen an astronaut as the games mascot, which is named A1 Angkasawan.

== Honours ==
=== Honours of Malaysia ===
- Negeri Sembilan
  - Knight Companion of the Order of Loyalty to Negeri Sembilan (DSNS) - Dato' (2008)

== See also ==
- Timeline of space travel by nationality
- List of Muslim astronauts
- Manipal University alumni
