= Ko San =

South Korean entrepreneur (born 1976)

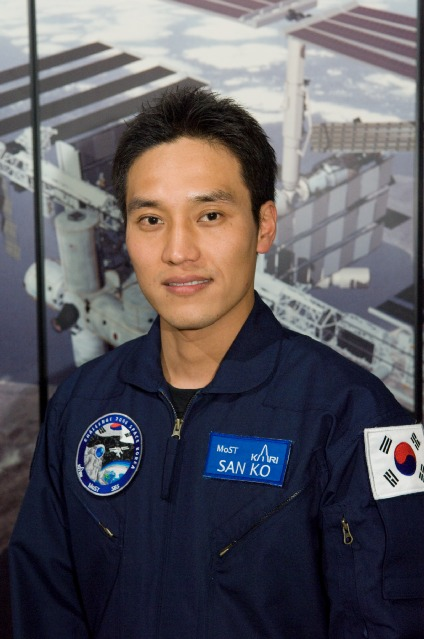
- Born: October 19, 1976 (age 49); Busan, South Korea
- Occupations: Entrepreneur, researcher
- Space career

KAP astronaut
- Selection: 2006 South Korean program
- Missions: None

- Ko San
- Hangul: 고산
- Hanja: 高山
- RR: Go San
- MR: Ko San

Ko San (born October 19, 1976) is a Korean businessman and former astronaut who is CEO and founder of TIDE Institute and ATEAM Ventures. Ko was a crew-member on the Soyuz TMA-12 space flight which took place in April 2008.

Born in Busan, Ko later became a researcher working in the field of computer vision. He was selected as a finalist in the Korean Astronaut Program in December 2006 and after his 2008 spaceflight continued to work at the Korea Aerospace Research Institute. He later founded the NGO TIDE Institute in 2011.

== Biography ==
Ko, San was born in Busan, South Korea. A graduate of Hanyoung Foreign Language High School, Ko studied mathematics and cognitive science at Seoul National University. He won a bronze medal at a national amateur boxing tournament in 2004 and climbed a 7,546-meter high mountain in China's Xinjiang Province, Muztagh Ata, the same year. After graduating at Seoul National University, he started working at Samsung Advanced Institute of Technology as a researcher. His research topic was computer vision.

On December 25, 2006, he was chosen as one of two finalists in the Korean Astronaut Program, set to fly as a crew on the Russian Soyuz TMA-12 in April 2008. On September 5, 2007, the Korean Ministry of Science and Technology chose Ko San over Yi So-Yeon based on performance in tests during training in Russia. However, on March 10, 2008, this decision was reversed, after the Russian Federal Space Agency asked for a replacement because Ko apparently violated security protocol for maintaining secret information twice at the Yuri Gagarin Cosmonaut Training Center.

After returning from Russia he continued working at Korea Aerospace Research Institute.

He started studying public policy at the John F. Kennedy School of Government at Harvard University in 2010. Now he is taking a leave of absence from the John F. Kennedy School of Government to run an NGO, TIDE Institute, which he founded in February 2011. In April 2013 he opened Fab Lab Seoul, a public open space where tools for digital fabrication such as 3D printers, CNCs and laser cutters are available for startups and makers.

== See also ==
- Timeline of space travel by nationality
- Yi So-yeon
