= National Space Agency (Malaysia) =

Malaysian National Space Agency

- Agensi Angkasa Negara

Agency overview
- Abbreviation: ANGKASA
- Formed: 2002
- Superseding agency: MYSA
- Type: Space agency
- Status: Merged with Malaysian Remote Sensing Agency (MRSA)
- Headquarters: Banting
- Owner: Malaysia
- Website: www.mysa.gov.my

The National Space Agency (Malay: Agensi Angkasa Negara), abbreviated ANGKASA, was the national space agency of Malaysia. It was established in 2002 and its charter aims to upgrade, stimulate and foster the country's space programme through integrated and coordinated efforts by developing and applying space technologies.

In 2019, the National Space Agency (ANGKASA) was merged with the Malaysian Remote Sensing Agency (MRSA) and renamed the Malaysian Space Agency (MYSA) for greater synergy.

== Angkasawan program ==
=== Crewed programs ===
The Angkasawan program was an initiative by the Malaysian government to send a Malaysian to the International Space Station on board Soyuz TMA-11. The program was named after the Malay word for astronaut, Angkasawan. It resulted in Sheikh Muszaphar Shukor becoming the first Malaysian in space on 10 October 2007.

The program was officially announced by the former Prime Minister of Malaysia, Mahathir Mohamad, as a joint programme with the Russian Federation. It was a project under the government-to-government offset agreement through the purchase of Sukhoi Su-30MKM fighter jets for the Royal Malaysian Air Force.

Under this agreement the Russian Federation bore the cost of training two Malaysians for space travel and for sending one to the International Space Station (ISS) in October 2007. It resulted in Sheikh Muszaphar Shukor becoming the first Malaysian in space on 10 October 2007.

The evidence suggests that the main objectives of the program are to uplift the national image and to instill in the younger generation greater interest in mathematics and science. At the launch, the then Malaysian Science, Technology and Innovation Minister Datuk Seri Dr Jamaluddin Jarjis said: "It is not merely a project to send a Malaysian into space. After 50 years of independence, we need a new shift and a new advantage to be more successful as a nation. "We want to awe and inspire, and spur Malaysians to attain greater success by embracing science and technology."

Later, Dr Jamaluddin Jarjis was more specific as to the objective of the program when he said that it "was to create awareness among Malaysians the importance of science, technology and the space industry, which could help develop the economy further."

Sheikh Muszaphar Shukor himself said that "I am not seeking fame or looking forward to be welcomed like a celebrity, but my quest is to inspire Malaysians, especially school children to like learning the subject of science and the space industry."

=== Muslims in space ===
In April 2006, ANGKASA sponsored a conference of scientists and religious authorities, addressing the issue of how the circumstances of space travel would affect the obligations faced by Muslim astronauts (for instance, how can one face the qibla while orbiting the Earth).

The Malaysian National Space Agency, in co-operation with other Malaysian agencies, developed the "Guidelines for Performing Islamic Rites at the International Space Station" with the help of 150 scientists and clerics. The handbook details how Muslim astronauts may observe Islamic rites while in orbit. Daily prayer times are aligned with those at the point of departure and if Mecca cannot be located, the astronauts may pray toward the Earth itself. Female Muslim astronauts are required to cover everything but the palms of their hands and their faces.

== Satellite programs ==
Malaysia uses both satellites purchased abroad and developed in country by Astronautic Technology Sdn Bhd (ATSB). All of Malaysia's satellites are launched abroad.

=== TiungSAT ===
TiungSAT is the first Malaysian microsatellite. The satellite was developed through the technology transfer and training programme between Astronautic Technology Sdn Bhd (ATSB) and Surrey Satellite Technology of the United Kingdom. TiungSAT-1 was launched aboard the Dnepr rocket from the Baikonur Cosmodrome in Kazakhstan on 26 September 2000. The satellite was developed for experiments in Earth imaging, observation of meteorology, detection of cosmic rays, data storage and communications.

=== MEASAT ===
MEASAT (Malaysia East Asia Satellite) is the name of a family of communications satellites owned and operated by MEASAT Satellite Systems Sdn. Bhd. (MYX: 3875, formerly Binariang Satellite Systems Sdn. Bhd.), a Malaysian communications satellite operator.

As of 2006, the MEASAT satellite network consisted of three geostationary satellites designed and built by Boeing Satellite Systems. MEASAT-1 and MEASAT-2 were launched in 1996 and MEASAT-3 in 2006.

The MEASAT-1 and 2 satellites were designed to provide 12 years of both direct-to-user television service in Malaysia and general communications services in the region from Malaysia to the Philippines and from Beijing to Indonesia. With the launch of MEASAT-3, the coverage has extended to an area encompassing 70% of the world's population.

=== RazakSAT ===
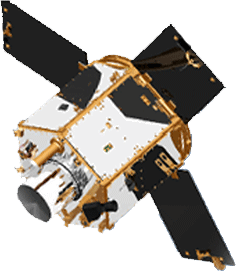
RazakSAT, one of the Malaysian satellite made by ATSB

RazakSAT is a high-resolution Malaysian Low Earth Orbit (LEO) satellite made by Astronautic Technology Sdn Bhd (ATSB) that was launched on board a Falcon 1 on 14 July 2009. It was placed into a unique near equatorial orbit that presents many imaging opportunities for the equatorial region. RazakSAT is an Earth-observing satellite developed in Malaysia and launched in 2009. Its primary instrument is a medium-aperture camera. Images from the camera are relayed to an Image Receiving and Processing ground station in Malaysia. It failed barely more than 1 year after launch, according to an audit report from October 2011.

=== InnoSAT ===
Developed by ATSB. The cubesat InnoSAT-2 (COSPAR 2018-096V, SATCAT 43738) was launched on 29 Nov 2018 by ISRO. InnoSAT-2 carried a dosimeter, a CMOS camera and an experimental reaction wheel. The satellite bus was locally developed. InnoSAT-2 decayed from orbit on 9 December 2022.

== Space launch plans ==
In 2001, ANGKASA collaborated with Japan to develop a space launch site in either the East Malaysian state of Sabah or Sarawak.

== Infrastructure ==
ANGKASA has few satellite-linked ground stations and main Malaysia Space Centre including acting multi-laboratorial Mission Operation Centre, Optical Calibration Laboratory and currently building multi-facilitated Assembly, Integration and Test Centre.

For performing of starts of future indigenous space launchers and foreign operators of space launch services (usual launch pads or air-space systems like Russian air launch etc.), Malaysia is planning to found energy-advantageous near-Equatorial spaceport in Tawau in Sabah in Malaysian part of Borneo island.

== See also ==
- Malaysian Space Agency (MYSA)
- Malaysian Remote Sensing Agency (MRSA)
