= Soyuz TMA-12 =

2008 Russian crewed spaceflight to the ISS

- Operator: Roscosmos
- COSPAR ID: 2008-015A
- SATCAT no.: 32756
- Mission duration: 198d 16h 21m

Spacecraft properties
- Spacecraft type: Soyuz-TMA
- Manufacturer: Energia

Crew
- Crew size: 3
- Members: Sergey Volkov; Oleg Kononenko
- Launching: Yi So-Yeon
- Landing: Richard Garriott
- Callsign: Eridan

Start of mission
- Launch date: April 8, 2008, 11:16:39 UTC
- Rocket: Soyuz-FG
- Launch site: Baikonur 1/5

End of mission
- Landing date: October 24, 2008, 03:37 UTC

Orbital parameters
- Reference system: Geocentric
- Regime: Low Earth

Docking with ISS
- Docking port: Pirs nadir
- Docking date: 10 April 2008; 12:57 UTC
- Undocking date: 24 October 2008; 00:16 UTC
- Time docked: 196d 11h 19m
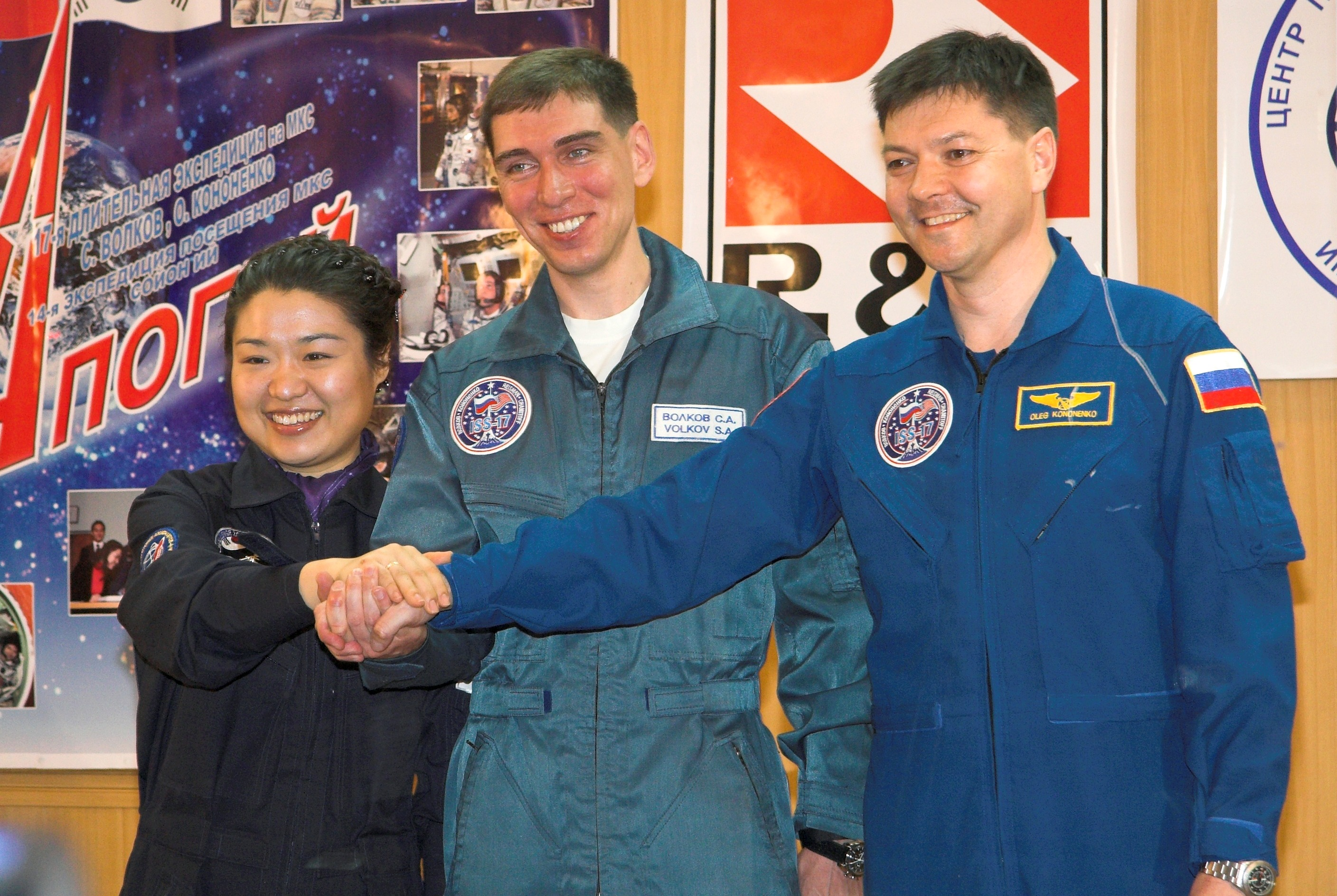
- From left to right: Yi So-yeon, Sergey Volkov, Oleg Kononenko Soyuz programme (Crewed missions)

Soyuz TMA-12 was a Soyuz mission to the International Space Station (ISS) which was launched by a Soyuz FG rocket at 11:16 UTC on 8 April 2008. It docked to the Pirs module of the station on 10 April 2008. Landing occurred at 03:37 on 24 October. It was the first nominal landing in three missions, following separation failures on the Soyuz TMA-10 and 11 spacecraft.

== Crew ==
Position	Launching crew	Landing crew
Commander	(Russia) Sergey Volkov, Roscosmos; Expedition 17; First spaceflight	
Flight Engineer	(Russia) / (Turkmenistan) Oleg Kononenko, Roscosmos; Expedition 17; First spaceflight	
Spaceflight Participant	(South Korea) Yi So-Yeon, KAP; Only spaceflight	(United Kingdom) / (United States) Richard Garriott, SA; Only spaceflight

=== Backup crew ===
Position	Launching crew	Landing crew
Commander	(Russia) Maksim Surayev, Roscosmos	
Flight Engineer	(Russia) Oleg Skripochka, Roscosmos	
Spaceflight Participant	(South Korea) Ko San, KAP	(Australia) Nik Halik, SA

=== Crew Notes ===
Yi So-yeon flew as a guest of the Russian government through the Korean Astronaut Program after the Korean government paid the Russian government 25 million US dollars in agreement to support the first Korean astronaut in space. Her role aboard the Soyuz is referred to as a Spaceflight Participant in English-language Russian Federal Space Agency and NASA documents and press briefings. Ko San was originally scheduled to fly, with Yi as his backup. On 10 March 2008, it was announced that Ko breached regulations surrounding removal of books from the training centre in Russia, and therefore would not be allowed to fly.

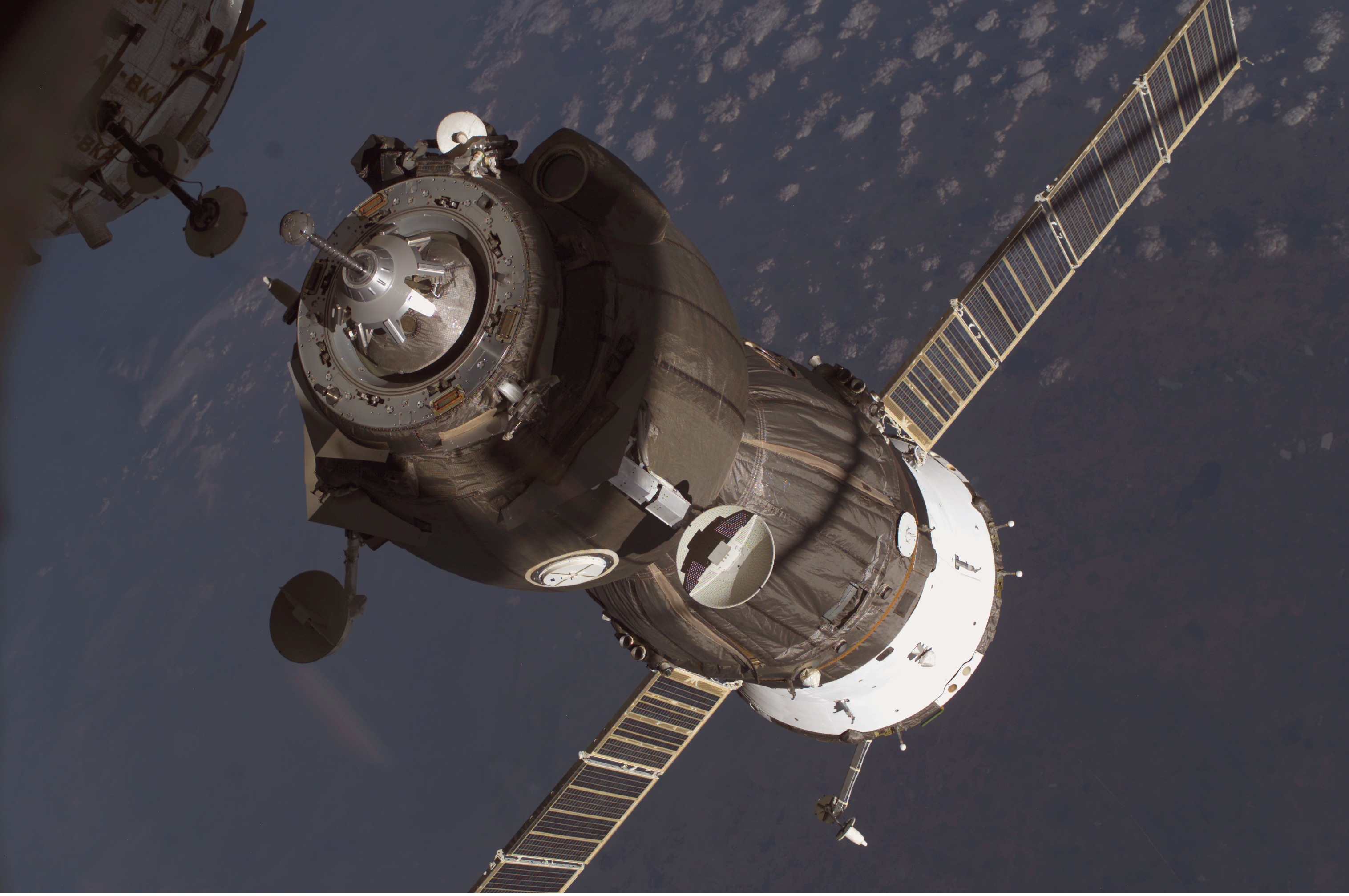
Soyuz TMA-12 approaches the International Space Station for docking on 10 April 2008.

Richard Garriott flew as a private astronaut through a program run by Space Adventures. He is also referred to as a Spaceflight Participant in English-language Roscosmos and NASA documents.

Soyuz TMA-12 saw the joined landing of the world's first two second-generation space travellers, Sergey Volkov and Richard Garriott. Volkov's father, Aleksandr Volkov, flew to space three times and visited the Salyut 7 and Mir space stations. Garriott's father, Owen Garriott, flew to space twice and visited the Skylab space station.
