= Faiz Khaleed =

Malaysian dentist and astronaut

Faiz bin Khaleed
- Born: September 15, 1980 (age 46); Kuala Lumpur, Malaysia
- Occupation: Military dentist
- Space career

ANGKASA Astronaut
- Status: Active
- Rank: Major
- Selection: 2006 Angkasawan program
- Missions: None

Faiz bin Khaleed (born September 15, 1980 in Kuala Lumpur, Malaysia) is a Malaysian military dentist with the Malaysian Armed Forces. In September 2006, he was selected as one of two final candidates to undergo astronaut training in Star City as part of the Angkasawan program. The other candidate was Sheikh Muszaphar Shukor.

Faiz received his early education in St. John's Institution, Kuala Lumpur.

In 2007, Sheikh Muszaphar was selected to fly to the International Space Station with Expedition 16 on board the Soyuz TMA-11 in October 2007.

Faiz still might go to space if Malaysia decides to proceed with a second space flight.

On 22 October 2007, Faiz was promoted to a Major in the Malaysian Armed Forces. Faiz retired from Malaysian Armed Forces with last rank Major late 2013.
