= Korean Astronaut Program =

Program that sent first South Korean to space in 2008

- Hangul: 한국 우주인 배출 사업
- Hanja: 韓國宇宙人輩出事業
- RR: Hanguk ujuin baechul saeop
- MR: Han'guk ujuin paech'ul saŏp

The Korean Astronaut Program (Korean: 한국 우주인 배출 사업) was an initiative by the South Korean government to send the first Korean into space via the Russian space program. A ten-day flight to the International Space Station (ISS) with astronaut Yi So-yeon occurred in 2008.

== First astronaut class ==
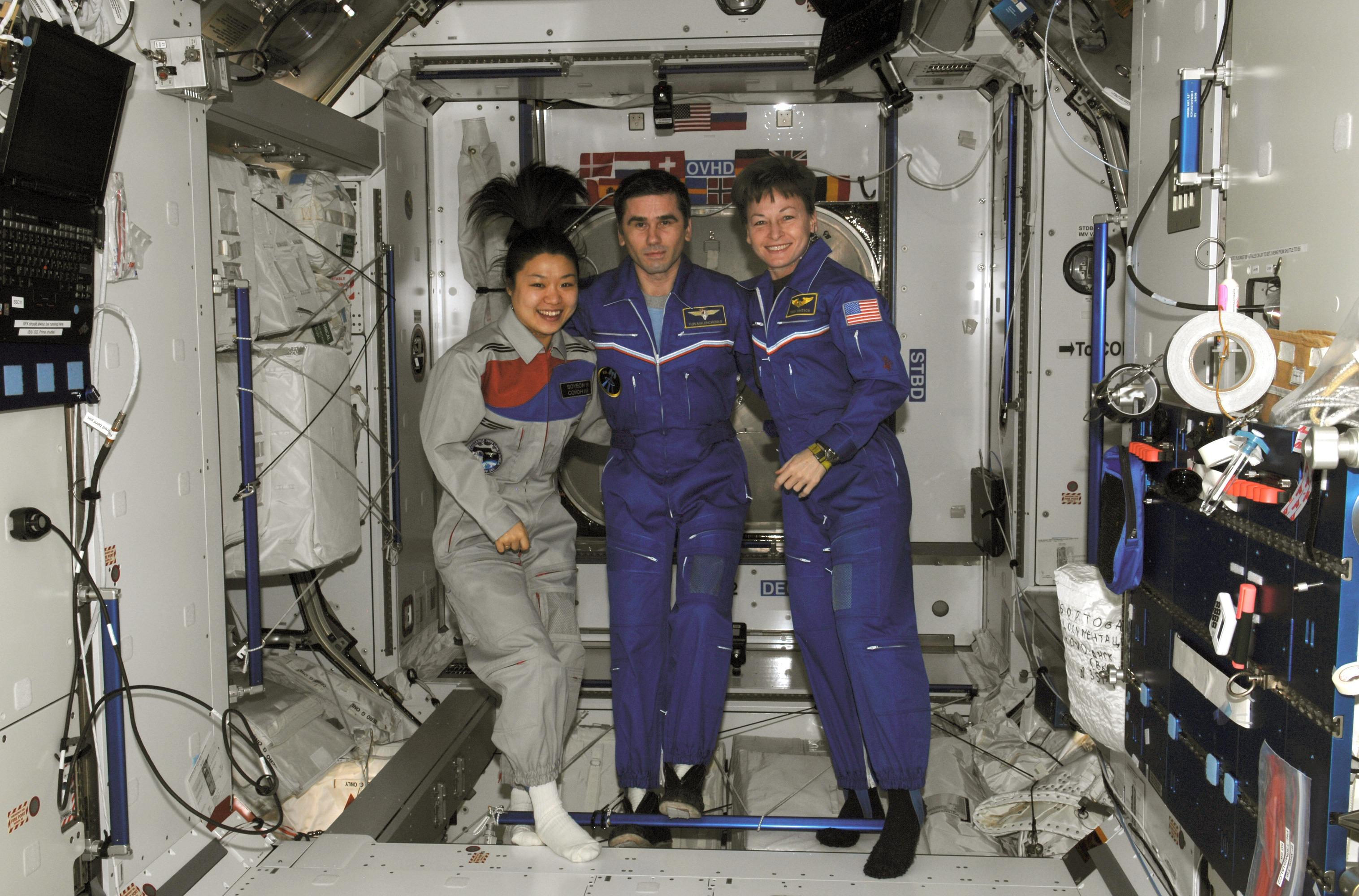
Yi So-yeon with NASA astronaut Peggy Whitson (right), Expedition 16 commander, and Russian Federal Space Agency cosmonaut Yuri Malenchenko (middle), flight engineer, at the International Space Station in April 2008.

On December 25, 2006, two candidates—one woman and one man—were selected by South Korea during a ceremony held at SBS television center in Dungchon-dong, Seoul. This choice was the result of a comprehensive selection process which started with the screening of 36,000 applications.

- Ko San (36, male, unmarried, researcher at Samsung Advanced Institute of Technology)
- Yi So-yeon (34, female, unmarried, researcher at the KAIST)

=== Other finalists ===
The eight other finalists were:

- Park Ji-young (23, female, master's course student at the Korea Advanced Institute of Science and Technology)
- Yun Seok-oh (29, male, unmarried, official at Hanyang University)
- Lee Jin-young (36, male, married, squadron leader at Republic of Korea Air Force)
- Jang Joon-sung (25, male, unmarried, lieutenant at Bucheon Nambu Police Station)
- Ryu Jeong-won (33, male, married, chief technology officer at IT Magic Co.)
- Lee Han-gyu (33, male, unmarried, researcher at Samsung SDI)
- Choi Ah-jeong (24, female, unmarried, master's course student at Seoul National University)
- Kim Young-min (33, male, married, researcher at Korea Basic Science Institute)

=== First space mission ===
The winning pair was sent to Russia in early 2007 to undergo a 15-month training course at the Gagarin Cosmonaut Training Center near Moscow.

On September 5, 2007, Ko San was named as the prime candidate, whilst Yi So-yeon served as his backup. However, on March 10, 2008, it was announced that the prime candidate would be changed to Yi So-yeon due to several violations of training protocol by Ko San. Ko San served as backup.

On April 8, 2008 Yi So-yeon took off from the Baikonur space center in Kazakhstan at 11:16 GMT aboard Soyuz TMA-12. She spent ten days conducting scientific experiments aboard the International Space Station.

It cost South Korea approximately 26 billion won (US$28 million) to pay for the training and spaceflight.

=== Post-first mission ===
In 2014, Yi So-yeon resigned from the program to pursue an MBA, which was incompatible with continuing as an astronaut.
