= Malaysian Space Agency =

National space agency of Malaysia

- Agensi Angkasa Malaysia (Malay)

Agency overview
- Formed: February 20, 2019
- Preceding agencies: National Space Agency (ANGKASA); Malaysian Remote Sensing Agency (MRSA)
- Jurisdiction: Malaysia
- Headquarters: No. 13, Jalan Tun Ismail, 50480 Kuala Lumpur, Malaysia; 3.1667°N 101.7000°E
- Minister responsible: Minister of Science, Technology and Innovation
- Parent agency: Ministry of Science, Technology and Innovation (MOSTI)
- Website: mysa.gov.my

The Malaysian Space Agency (Malay: Agensi Angkasa Malaysia), abbreviated MYSA, is the national space agency of Malaysia. On 20 February 2019, the Malaysian Cabinet had approved the establishment of MYSA through the merging of Malaysian Remote Sensing Agency (MRSA) and National Space Agency (ANGKASA).

In March 2019, the Minister of Energy, Science, Technology, Environment and Climate Change, Yeo Bee Yin said MYSA would focus on technology, infrastructure and strategic space application development. It would be tasked with gathering comprehensive satellite data and information systems to assist various public agencies effectively in terms of environment, natural resources, food security, disaster management and climate change management. The collected data and information can be shared with the private sector, to help them develop and achieve their own modelling system. The merge of MRSA and ANGKASA into one agency would improve work efficiencies by optimising the use of existing resources and facilities.

As of 2020, the director general is Tuan Haji Azlikamil Napiah.

== Function ==
- Develop the nation's capability in comprehensive and coordinated manner in the field of technology, application and space science
- Implement research and development and provide total solution in space technology and applications, and space science
- Acquire and provide satellite data specifically received through the national ground receiving station and generate related information for the requirement and use in various fields
- Implement the National Space Policy and value add the existing related national policy
- Coordinate and promote international cooperation in space technology research and development to strengthen the local expertise

== Space launch plans ==
In 2023, Ministry of Science, Technology and Innovation (MOSTI) developed a guideline for feasibility study for space launch site. MYSA collaborates with the Russian Roscosmos space agency to develop a launch site in Sabah. A feasibility study was done and Lahad Datu was identified as a suitable rocket launch site.

Lundu and Sematan, located in the state of Sarawak were identified as a satellite launch site in 2024.

== See also ==
- List of government space agencies
- Malaysian Remote Sensing Agency (MRSA)
- National Space Agency (ANGKASA)
