= Daisuke =

- Pronunciation: IPA: [daꜜisɯ̥ke]
- Gender: Male

Origin
- Origin: Japanese
- Meaning: different meanings depending on the kanji used
- Region of origin: Japan

Daisuke (だいすけ, ダイスケ) is a common masculine Japanese given name.

== Written forms ==
Daisuke can be written using different kanji characters and can mean:

- 大輔, "big, assist"
- 大介, "big, mediate"
- 大祐, "big, bless"
- 大助, "big, help"
- 大典, "big, law/rule/ceremony"

The name can also be written in hiragana or katakana.

== Manga artists ==
- Daisuke Higuchi (樋口 大輔), a Japanese female manga artist best known for her work on Whistle!
- Daisuke Igarashi (五十嵐大介), a Japanese manga artist known for his bold, detailed art style and innovative storytelling
- Daisuke Moriyama (森山大輔), a Japanese manga artist best known for creating the Chrono Crusade series

== Sportspeople ==
- Daisuke Arakawa (荒川 大輔; born 1981), Japanese long jumper
- Daisuke Ejima (江島 大佑; born 1986), Japanese Paralympic swimmer
- Daisuke Houki (宝亀 大輔; born 1961), Japanese water polo player
- Daisuke Ikeshima (池島 大介), retired Japanese race walker
- Daisuke Kataoka (片岡 大育; born 1988), Japanese golfer
- Daisuke Maeda (前田 大介), Japanese Paralympic swimmer
- Daisuke Matsuzaka (松坂 大輔), retired Japanese professional baseball pitcher
- Daisuke Murakami (snowboarder), (村上 大輔), Japanese snowboarder who competed in the 2002 Winter Olympics
- Daisuke Naito (内藤 大助), retired Japanese professional boxer
- Daisuke Nakajima (中嶋 大祐), retired Japanese racing driver
- Daisuke Nakata (中田大輔), Japanese trampolinist who competed in the 2000 Summer Olympics
- Daisuke Obara (小原 大輔; born 1981), Japanese ice hockey player
- Daisuke Ohata, (大畑大介), Japanese rugby player
- Daisuke Usami, (宇佐美 大輔), Japanese volleyball player

=== Football players ===
- Daisuke Ichikawa (市川 大祐), Japanese football player who plays as a defender and midfielder for the Fujieda MYFC team
- Daisuke Ishizu (石津 大介; born 1990), Japanese football player
- Daisuke Kanzaki (神崎 大輔; born 1985), Japanese footballer
- Daisuke Kikuchi (菊池 大介; born 1991), Japanese footballer
- Daisuke Matsui (松井 大輔), Japanese footballer who plays for Lechia Gdańsk of Ekstraklasa in Poland
- Daisuke Nakamori (中森 大介; born 1974), Japanese footballer and manager
- Daisuke Nasu (那須 大亮), Japanese football player who plays for the Urawa Red Diamonds
- Daisuke Nishiguchi (西口 大輔; born 1988), Japanese footballer
- Daisuke Oku, Japanese former football player
- Daisuke Sakata, (坂田 大輔), Japanese football (soccer) player who plays for Avispa Fukuoka in the J. League
- Daisuke Takahashi (footballer) (高橋 大輔; born 1983), Japanese footballer

=== Skaters ===
- Daisuke Murakami (figure skater) (村上 大介), Japanese figure skater
- Daisuke Takahashi (髙橋 大輔; born 1986), Japanese figure skater

=== Wrestlers ===
- Daisuke Harada (原田 大輔), professional wrestler signed to Pro Wrestling Noah
- Daisuke Ikeda (池田大輔), professional wrestler competing in the Independent circuit in Japan
- Daisuke Sasaki (佐々木 大輔), professional wrestler
- Daisuke Sekimoto (関本 大介), professional wrestler
- Daisuke Tochiazuma, retired sumo wrestler

== Actors & voice actors ==
- Daisuke Gōri (郷里 大輔, 1952–2010), Japanese voice actor, actor and narrator
- Daisuke Hirakawa (平川 大輔, born 1973), Japanese voice actor
- Daisuke Kishio (岸尾 だいすけ), Japanese voice actor
- Daisuke Nakamura (actor) (中村 大輔), Japanese voice actor
- Daisuke Namikawa (浪川 太亮, born 1976), Japanese voice actor
- Daisuke Nakagawa (中川 大輔; born 1998), Japanese actor and model
- Daisuke Ono (小野 大輔, born 1978), Japanese voice actor well known for voicing Sebastian Michaelis in the anime adaptation of Black Butler and Jotaro Kujo in JoJo's Bizarre Adventure
- Daisuke Sakaguchi (阪口 大助, born 1973), Japanese voice actor affiliated with Aoni Production
- Daisuke Tsuji (辻 大介), Japanese-American actor and voice actor

== Other ==
- Daisuke Amaya (天谷 大輔; born 1977), Japanese independent game developer
- Daisuke Asakura (浅倉 大介; born 1967), Japanese pop artist, songwriter and producer
- Daisuke Ban (伴 大介; born 1947), Japanese actor
- Daisuke Enomoto (榎本 大輔; born 1971), Japanese businessman and former livedoor executive
- Daisuke Inoue (井上 大佑; born 1940), Japanese businessman who invented Karaoke
- Daisuke Inoue (井上大輔; (1941–2000)), Japanese singer, composer and multi-instrumentist
- Daisuke Ishiwatari (石渡 太輔; born 1973), Japanese video game developer and musician
- Daisuke Katagami (片上 大輔; born 1986), Japanese shogi player
- Daisuke Katō (加東 大介; 1911–1975), Japanese actor
- Daisuke Kobayashi (小林 大祐; born 1987), Japanese basketball player
- Daisuke Matsumoto (politician) (松本 大輔; born 1971), Japanese politician
- Daisuke Miyagawa (宮川 大輔; born 1973), Japanese comedian and actor
- Daisuke Murakawa (村川大介; born 1990), Japanese professional Go player
- Daisuke Nakagawa (中川 大輔; born 1968), Japanese shogi player
- Daisuke Nakagawa (中川 大輔; born 1998), Japanese actor (Kamen Rider Zero-One)
- Daisuke Nakamura (fighter) (中村 大介; born 1980), Japanese mixed martial artist
- Daisuke Namba (難波 大助; 1899–1924), Japanese student who tried to assassinate Hirohito in 1923
- Daisuke Shima (嶋 大輔; born 1964), Japanese actor
- Daisuke Suzuki (鈴木 大介; born 1974), Japanese shogi player
- Daisuke Takahashi (mathematician), Japanese mathematician
- Daisuke Tsuda (musician) (津田 大介; born 1977), vocalist of the Japanese band Maximum the Hormone
- Daisuke Tsuda (journalist) (津田 大介; born 1973), Japanese IT, music journalist, and writer
- Daisuke Ueda (上田 太輔; born 1987), Japanese male model
- Daisuke Watanabe (渡辺 大祐; born 1974), Japanese video game scenario writer
- Daisuke Watanabe (actor) (渡辺 大輔; born 1982), Japanese stage/screen/TV actor
- Daisuke Yokota (横田 大輔; born 1983), Japanese photographer
- Daisuke Yokoyama (横山 だいすけ, 横山 大介; born 1983), Japanese singer and actor

== Fictional characters ==
- Daisuke Aoki (青木 大介), in the manga Kodomo no Jikan
- Daisuke Aramaki (荒巻 大輔), from the manga Ghost in the Shell
- Daisuke Aurora (ダイスケ・アウローラ), from Heat Guy J.
- Daisuke Hayami (速見 ダイスケ), from the anime Rockman.exe NT Warrior
- Daisuke Hyuuga (日向 大介), from the anime Futari wa Pretty Cure Splash Star
- Daisuke Jigen (次元 大介), from Lupin III manga
- Daisuke Kazama (風間 大介), from Kamen Rider Kabuto
- Daisuke Motomiya (本宮 大輔) (Davis Motomiya in English dub), from Digimon
- Daisuke Niwa (丹羽 大助), of manga and anime series, D.N.Angel
- Daisuke Serizawa, eyepatch-wearing character in Godzilla
- Daisuke, from the film Urduja
- Daisuke, from the film The Grudge 3
- Daisuke Izumo (出雲 大介), from the tokusatsu series, Ninja Captor
- Daisuke Umon (宇門 大介), from the anime/manga series, UFO Robot Grendizer
- Daisuke Kanbe (神戸 大助), from anime series The Millionaire Detective Balance: Unlimited
- Daisuke Ido (イド ダイスケ), from the manga Battle Angel Alita
- Daisuke, from the game Mouthwashing
- Daisuke, from the dating sim game Date Everything!

== See also ==
- Dice-K
