= Daisuke Enomoto =

Japanese businessman

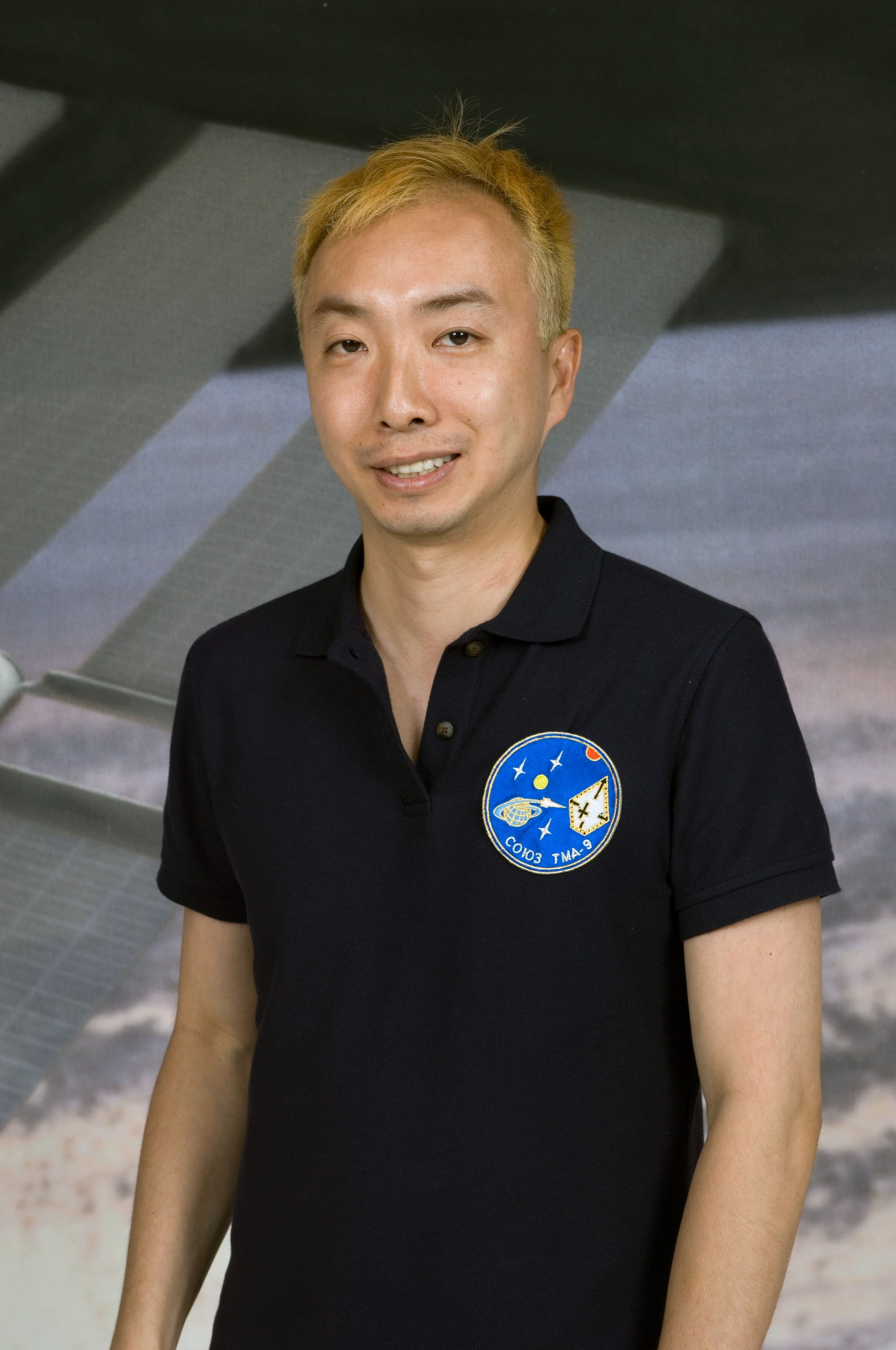
- Enomoto in 2006
- Born: April 22, 1971 (age 55); Matsudo, Japan
- Occupation: Businessman
- Space career

Spaceflight participant Candidate
- Selection: 2005
- Missions: None

Daisuke Enomoto (榎本 大輔, Enomoto Daisuke; born April 22, 1971, nicknamed Dice-K) is a Japanese businessman, entrepreneur and former senior executive of the Japanese internet company livedoor. During the 1990s he founded and built up several technology businesses in Japan and Hong Kong, including the software company Pro-G Group, which became part of livedoor; he then served at livedoor as executive vice president, chief strategic officer and board member until 2003.

Enomoto later drew international attention as a prospective private space traveller. In 2005 he was selected by Space Adventures as its next private space explorer, and he trained in Russia for a planned 2006 flight to the International Space Station that would have made him the fourth space tourist and the first self-funded one from Japan and Asia. Weeks before launch he was withdrawn from the mission on medical grounds, a decision that led to a lawsuit against Space Adventures, which the two parties settled in 2009.

== Business career ==
In 1994 Enomoto founded EXA Co., Ltd. in Tokyo, which sold Taiwanese and Hong Kong computer peripherals such as modems in Japan; the company was later sold. In 1996 he set up EXasia Hong Kong Limited, an internet service provider and systems consultancy serving Japanese residents of Hong Kong, which was also sold. In 1998 he founded Pro-G Group Co. Ltd. in Tokyo, which sold and localized international software for the Japanese market; it was acquired by livedoor.

Pro-G was established in 1998 as a limited company and reorganized as Pro-G Group in 2000; in 2002 it became a wholly owned subsidiary of On the Edge, the company later renamed livedoor. Enomoto made his fortune from the sale of the business to livedoor president Takafumi Horie.

Until 2003 Enomoto was executive vice president, chief strategic officer and a board member of livedoor, where he led the group's mergers and acquisitions as well as strategic licensing in its software, online game and IT service divisions.

After leaving livedoor he worked as an independent investor. As of 2006 he provided investment and strategic advisory services to companies including the mobile content provider NetVillage and the venture capital firm Astrix Capital Partners. He was then based in Hong Kong and also founded DICE-K.com.

== Spaceflight training ==
Enomoto signed with Space Adventures in November 2004. The company announced him as its next spaceflight candidate on November 3, 2005, when he began full training at Star City. In March 2006 Russia's medical commission found him fit for training and the final contract for his flight aboard Soyuz TMA-9 was signed. His red flight costume was developed with partners including a unit of JAXA's Space Open Lab, Japan Women's University, Toray, Goldwin, Shima Seiki and Bandai.

Enomoto trained at the Yuri Gagarin Cosmonaut Training Center in Star City, near Moscow, where he prepared to fly alongside two members of Expedition 14, Mikhail Tyurin and Michael López-Alegría, aboard Soyuz TMA-9, which was launched on September 18, 2006.

Enomoto would have been the first self-funded space tourist from Japan and Asia (journalist Toyohiro Akiyama flew on Soyuz TM-11 in 1990, and could be regarded as the first space business traveller). Enomoto's flight would have taken him to the International Space Station (ISS) after lifting off from the Baikonur Cosmodrome in Kazakhstan, the world's oldest spaceport.

Enomoto made international news when it was revealed that he intended to go into space wearing a costume akin to that of Char Aznable, a character from the anime series Mobile Suit Gundam. His planned experiment was to put together one or more Gundam models in zero gravity.

== Medical disqualification and lawsuit ==
On August 21, 2006, less than a month before the scheduled launch, a Russian Federal Space Agency spokesman announced that Enomoto was "deemed not ready to fly for exclusively medical reasons", although he hinted that Enomoto might recover and join a later mission. His place on the flight was taken by his backup, Iranian-American businesswoman Anousheh Ansari, who thereby became the first woman to travel to the station as a self-funded spaceflight participant.

Enomoto lodged a lawsuit against Virginia-based Space Adventures in which he hoped to reclaim the $21 million he paid the company over a two-year span. During the lawsuit, it was revealed that the "medical reason" was chronic kidney stones. Space Adventures claims it advised Enomoto to treat the kidney stones aggressively and when he did not, they had to disqualify him from spaceflight. Enomoto claims that he was misled about the kidney stones issue, and that the real reason for his disqualification was his refusal to provide additional funds to Space Adventures.

The complaint alleged that Space Adventures had given Enomoto a misleading picture of his chances of making a spacewalk and had pushed him into payments that committed him to the $20 million contract even though his kidney stones were already known. Space Adventures rejected the claims and said the contract provided a refund only if the company or the Russian space agency could not deliver the flight. U.S. District Judge James C. Cacheris heard arguments on Space Adventures' motion to dismiss in November 2008. In March 2009 the court dismissed some of Enomoto's claims but allowed the case to proceed. The parties settled in July 2009.
