= Expedition 14 =

Expedition to a space station in 2006

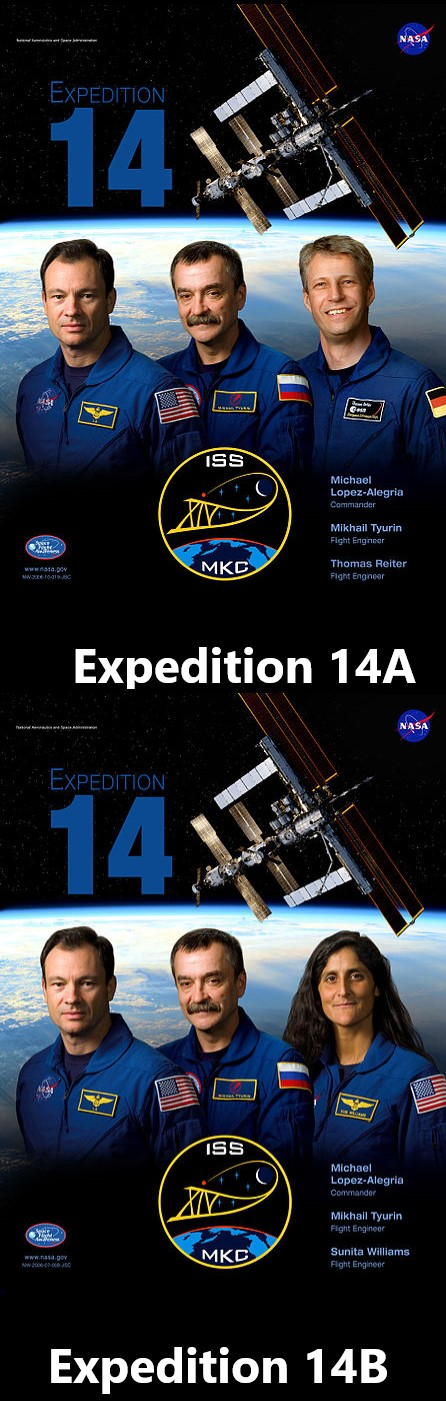
- Promotional Poster
- Mission type: Long-duration expedition
- Mission duration: 213 days, 3 hours and 50 minutes (at ISS) 215 days, 8 hours and 23 minutes (launch to landing) (for Soyuz TMA-9)
- Orbits completed: 3,401 (López-Alegría/Tyurin)

Expedition
- Space station: International Space Station
- Began: 18 September 2006, 04:09 UTC
- Ended: 21 April 2007, 12:31 UTC
- Arrived aboard: Soyuz TMA-9; Reiter: STS-121; Space Shuttle Discovery; Williams STS-116; Space Shuttle Discovery
- Departed aboard: Soyuz TMA-9; Reiter: STS-116; Space Shuttle Discovery; Williams STS-117; Space Shuttle Atlantis

Crew
- Crew size: 3
- Members: Michael López-Alegría; Mikhail Tyurin; Thomas Reiter* (until December); Sunita Williams† (from December) * – transferred from Expedition 13 † – transferred to Expedition 15
- EVAs: 5
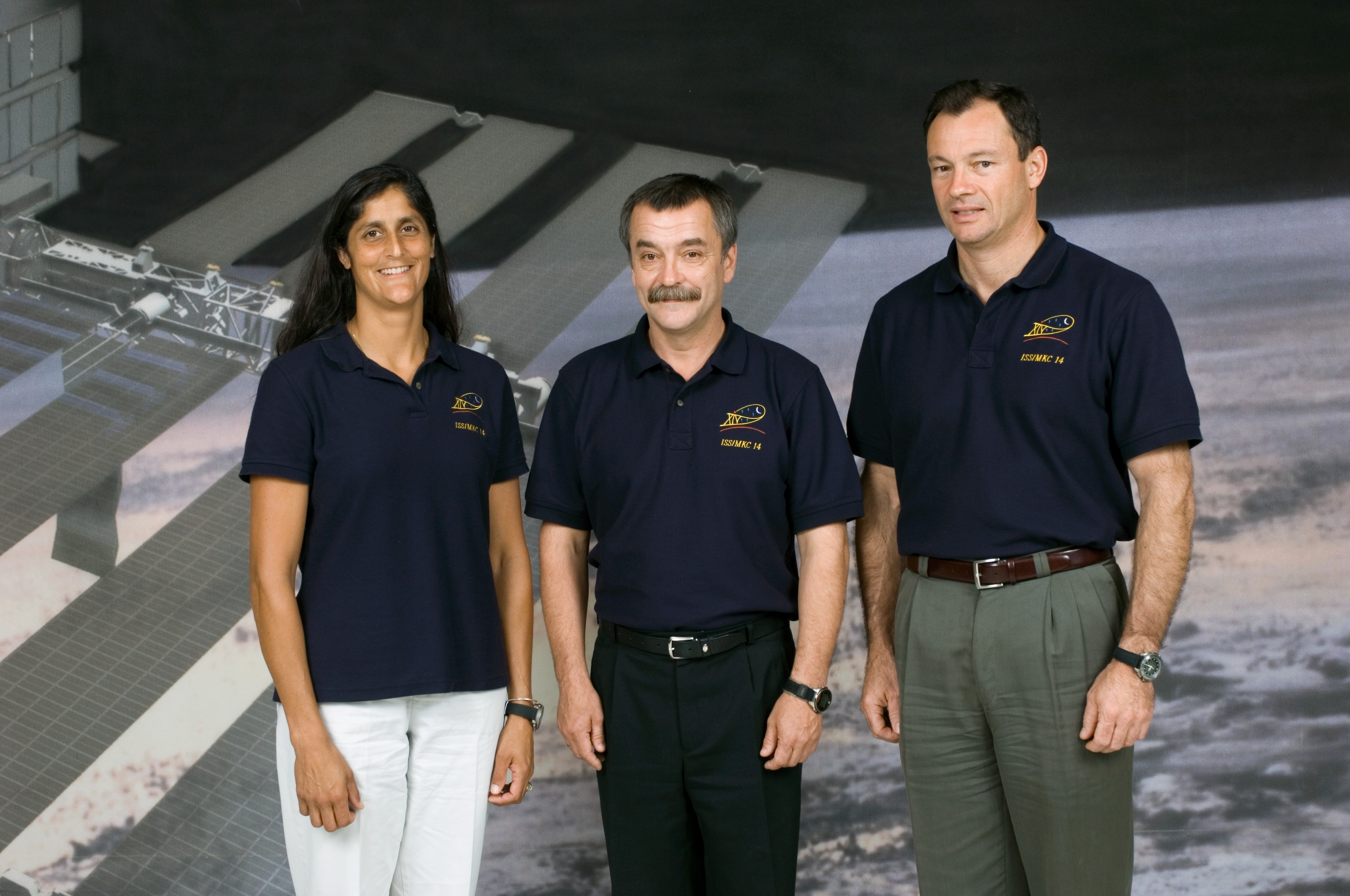
- Expedition 14 mission patch Sunita Williams, Mikhail Tyurin and Michael López-Alegría, mission commander of Expedition 14. ISS expeditions

Expedition 14 was the 14th expedition to the International Space Station (ISS). Commander Michael López-Alegría, and flight engineer Mikhail Tyurin launched from Baikonur Cosmodrome on 18 September 2006, 04:09 UTC, aboard Soyuz TMA-9. They joined Thomas Reiter, who had arrived at the ISS on 6 July 2006 aboard Space Shuttle Discovery during mission STS-121. In December 2006, Discovery mission STS-116 brought Sunita Williams to replace Reiter as the third member of Expedition 14. On 21 April 2007, López-Alegría and Tyurin returned to Earth aboard TMA-9. Landing occurred at 12:31:30 UTC.

== Crew ==
Position	First Part (September to December 2006)	Second Part (December 2006 to April 2007)
Commander	Michael López-Alegría, NASA; Fourth (last NASA) spaceflight	
Flight Engineer 1	Mikhail Tyurin, RSA; Second spaceflight	
Flight Engineer 2	Thomas Reiter, ESA; Second and last spaceflight	Sunita Williams, NASA; First spaceflight

== Backup crew ==
- Peggy Whitson Commander – NASA
- Yuri Malenchenko Flight Engineer – RSA
- Leopold Eyharts Flight Engineer – ESA (for Reiter)
- Clayton Anderson Flight Engineer – NASA (for Williams)

== Mission objectives ==
- To continue assembly of the International Space Station with three assembly spacewalks and a Space Shuttle mission: STS-116 (Discovery).
- To relocate Soyuz TMA-9 from the aft port of the Zvezda module to the nadir port of the Zarya module.
- To service three Progress visits to the ISS, filled with food, fuel, water and supplies to augment supplies delivered by the visiting Space Shuttles.
- Reconfigure power from solar arrays and cooling system.
- Remove and jettison shrouds covering the truss system.

== Mission highlights ==
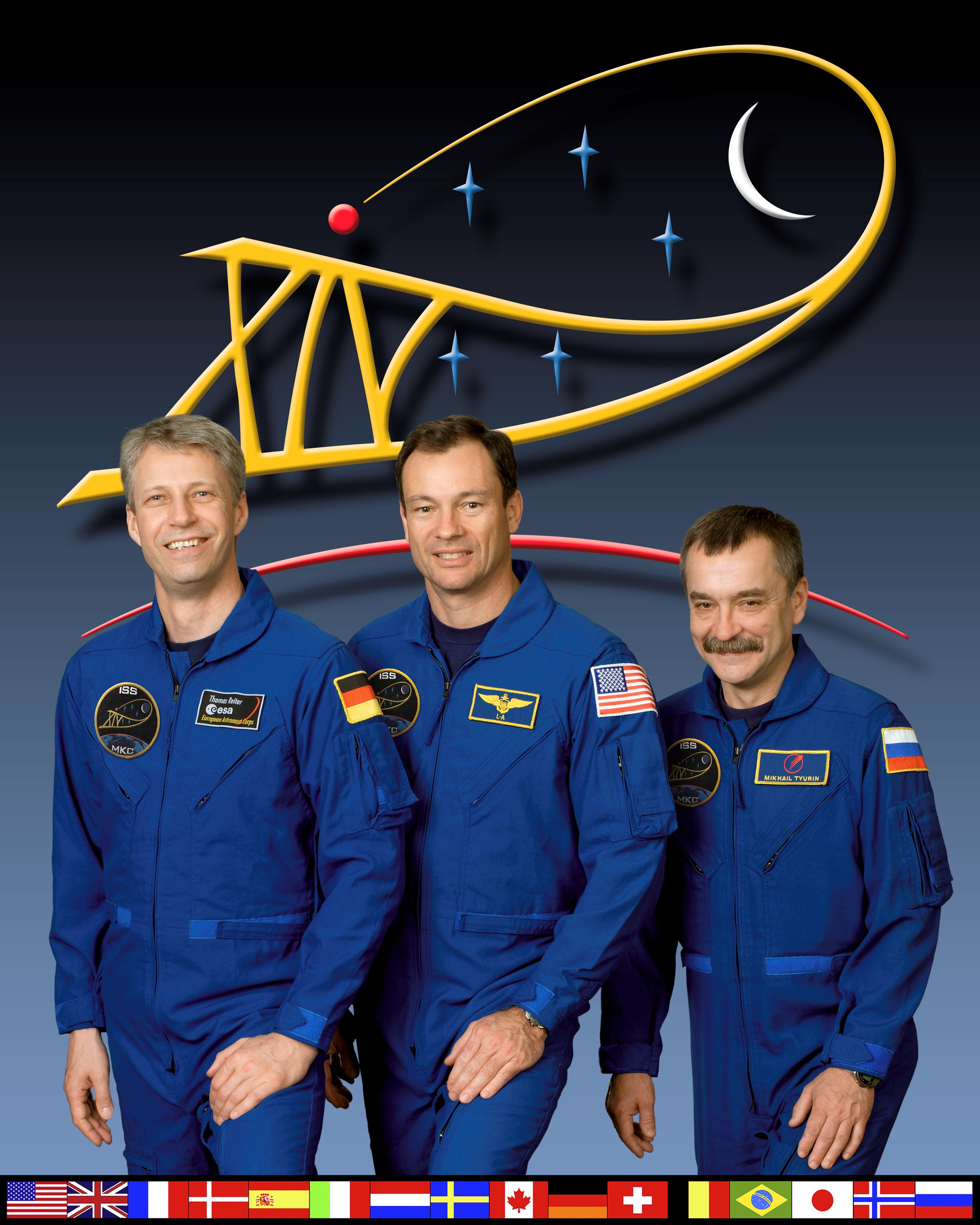
Expedition 14 during the first part of the mission

=== Launch and docking ===
The first crew of Expedition 14 launched, alongside spaceflight participant Anousheh Ansari, in Soyuz TMA-9, from Baikonur Cosmodrome in Kazakhstan aboard a Soyuz Rocket at 04:10 UTC on 18 September 2006. Cosmonaut Tyurin piloted the capsule in for a perfect docking two days later at 05:21 UTC on 20 September, with the hatch to the ISS opening at 08:30 UTC. The members of Expedition 14 (along with Ansari) were greeted warmly by Expedition 13 crew Pavel Vinogradov & Jeff Williams, and also by the third member of their own expedition, ESA astronaut Thomas Reiter, who officially switched from a member of Expedition 13 to membership of Expedition 14 when his soyuz seat-liner was switched.

=== Atlantis reentry ===
The day after docking, with the expedition crew working joint operations with Expedition 13, the ISS was positioned in such a way that the station's inhabitants were able to observe the re-entry of Space Shuttle Atlantis at the end of STS-115. As they watched Atlantis create a glowing contrail during its plunge into the atmosphere, López-Alegría and Williams provided commentary of the re-entry to the Mission Control Center in Houston. The station was a few hundred miles ahead of the shuttle at the time.

=== EVA 1 ===
The expedition's first spacewalk took place on 22 November 2006, starting at 19:17 EST (23:17 UTC), having been delayed from its scheduled 18:00 EST (20:00 UTC) start time due to a cooling issue in Tyurin's suit. Tyurin got out of the suit and straightened a suspect hose which apparently had become kinked.

During the spacewalk, Tyurin hit a golf ball from the exterior of the Pirs airlock. This "experiment" was sponsored by a Toronto-based commercial company, Element 21, which manufactures golf clubs made of scandium. The ball weighs just 3 grams, compared with 48 grams for a standard golf ball. At that weight, it was unlikely to damage any station components which might accidentally have been hit. There were three balls allowing two options for repeating the shot if required, but only one shot was actually taken. Taken with a one-handed grip by Tyurin (with López-Alegría stabilising Tyurin by holding his legs), the shot was a substantial slice, with the ball flying off to the right of the station instead of the rear. In 2006, there were plans for the video from the shot to be used in a TV commercial. The progress of the ball, which contains tracking equipment, could be followed on E21's Track the Ball in Space web site which was set up in 2006. Although, the site simply calculates an assumed distance of the ball based on a constant speed and does not perform any real tracking of the ball. The stunt was carried out around 35 years after Alan Shepard hit two golf balls on the moon during Apollo 14.

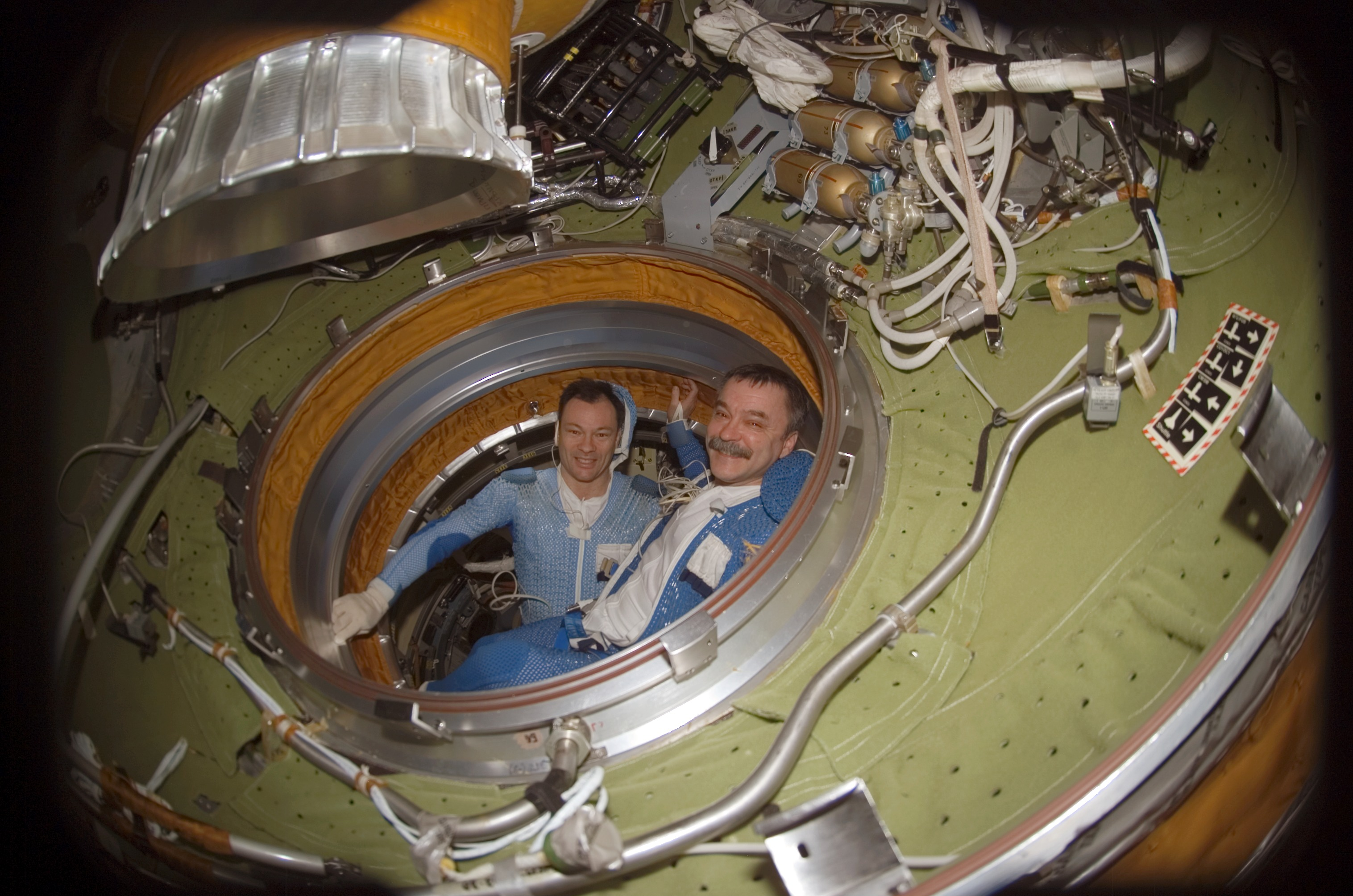
Commander Michael E. López-Alegría (left) and cosmonaut Mikhail Tyurin conduct pre-spacewalk operations in the Pirs airlock (February 2007)

Inspection of a Kurs antenna on the Progress 23 unpiloted cargo carrier that docked at the aft end of the station's Zvezda Service Module on 26 October 2006 was the next task. Final latching of the spacecraft to the station during the docking procedure was delayed by more than three hours because Mission Control Moscow was not sure the antenna was completely retracted. Tyurin and López-Alegría moved to the rear of Zvezda and photographed the antenna. It was still fully extended, so Tyurin used a screwdriver to release a latch and tried to retract the antenna. Russian flight controllers also tried to retract it by activating a motor. Neither succeeded, and the task was abandoned.

Next they relocated a WAL antenna, which was later used to guide the unpiloted European cargo carrier, the Automated Transfer Vehicle, when it docked with the station. The first ATV, Jules Verne, eventually docked with the ISS on 3 April 2008. In its previous position the antenna interfered with a cover for a Zvezda booster engine.

Then the two installed a BTN neutron experiment, which characterises charged and neutral particles in low Earth orbit. Atop Zvezda, its readings during solar bursts continue to be of special interest to scientists as of 2010. Two thermal covers from the BTN were jettisoned before the spacewalkers returned to the Pirs airlock at 00:55 EST (04:55 UTC) on the morning of 23 November, bringing the 5-hour, 38-minute EVA to a close .

A final scheduled task, an inspection of bolts on one of two Strela hand-operated cranes on the docking compartment, was postponed to a future EVA.

=== Conclusion ===
This mission was the longest expedition to the ISS thus far. Also, the Soyuz capsule was the oldest one ever used. López-Alegría, already the U.S. recordholder for spacewalks, now also holds the record for longest spaceflight by a NASA astronaut.

== Spacewalks ==
There were five spacewalks conducted during Expedition 14, totaling 33 hours and 42 minutes. Michael López-Alegría participated in all five space walks, while Sunita Williams took part in three, and Mikhail Tyurin participated in 2. López-Alegría's five spacewalks set a record for EVA's during an ISS mission. This was matched by Peggy Whitson during Expedition 16, who also performed five spacewalks.

Note: ‡ indicates a spacewalk conducted from the Pirs airlock.

Mission	Spacewalkers	Start (UTC)	End (UTC)	Duration
EVA 1‡	Mikhail Tyurin; Michael López-Alegría	22 November 2006; 23:17	23 November 2006; 04:55	5 hours, 38 minutes
EVA 1‡	"Orbiting golf shot" event sponsored by a Canadian golf company through the Russian Federal Space Agency. López-Alegría put the tee on the ladder outside Pirs, while Tyurin set up a camera, and then performed the golf shot. Inspected and photographed a Kurs antenna on Progress 23, relocated an Automated Transfer Vehicle (ATV) WAL antenna, installed a BTN neutron experiment, and jettisoned two thermal covers from the BTN.			
EVA 2	Michael López-Alegría; Sunita Williams	31 January 2007; 15:14	31 January 2007; 23:09	7 hours 55 minutes
EVA 2	Reconfigured one of the two cooling loops serving Destiny from the temporary to permanent system, connected a cable for the Station-to-Shuttle Power Transfer System (SSPTS), installed six cable cinches and two winch bars to secure the starboard radiator of the P6 Truss, and then installed a shroud over it. Removed one of two fluid lines from the Early Ammonia Servicer (EAS) on the P6 Truss. The EAS would be jettisoned during a later EVA.			
EVA 3	Michael López-Alegría; Sunita Williams	4 February 2007; 13:38	4 February 2007; 20:49	7 hours, 11 minutes
EVA 3	Reconfigured the second of the two cooling loops serving Destiny from the temporary to permanent system, completed work with the Early Ammonia Servicer (EAS) on the P6 Truss, photographed the inboard end of the P6 starboard solar wing in preparation for its retraction during STS-117, removed a sunshade from a multiplexer-demultiplexer data relay device, and continued work on the SSPTS.			
EVA 4	Michael López-Alegría; Sunita Williams	8 February 2007; 13:26	8 February 2007; 20:06	6 hours, 40 minutes
EVA 4	Removed two thermal shrouds on two Rotary Joint Motor Controllers (RJMC) on the P3 truss, removed two large shrouds from P3 Bays 18 and 20, and jettisoned the shrouds away from the station. Deployed an Unpressurized Cargo Carrier Assembly Attachment System (UCCAS) on the upper face of the P3 truss, removed two launch locks from the P5 truss, and connected four cables of the SSPTS to the Pressurized Mating Adapter (PMA-2) at the forward end of Destiny where shuttles dock.			
EVA 5‡	Mikhail Tyurin; Michael López-Alegría	22 February 2007; 10:27	22 February 2007; 16:45	6 hours, 18 minutes
EVA 5‡	Retracted the antenna of the Progress cargo carrier at the aft port of the Zvezda service module, photographed a Russian satellite navigation antenna, and replaced a Russian materials experiment, inspected and photographed an antenna for the Automated Transfer Vehicle (ATV), photographed a German robotics experiment, and inspected, remated, and photographed hardware connectors.			
