= Dice-K =

Dice-K may refer to:

- a nickname for Daisuke

It may more specifically refer to:

- Daisuke Enomoto (榎本 大輔; born 1971), Japanese businessman
- Daisuke Matsuzaka (松坂 大輔; born 1980), Japanese pro-baseball player, who also pitched in North American MLB
- Daisuke Takahashi (髙橋 大輔; born 1986), Japanese figure skater, in men's singles and ice dance; who was men's world champion
