= Soyuz TMA-9 =

2006 Russian crewed spaceflight to the ISS

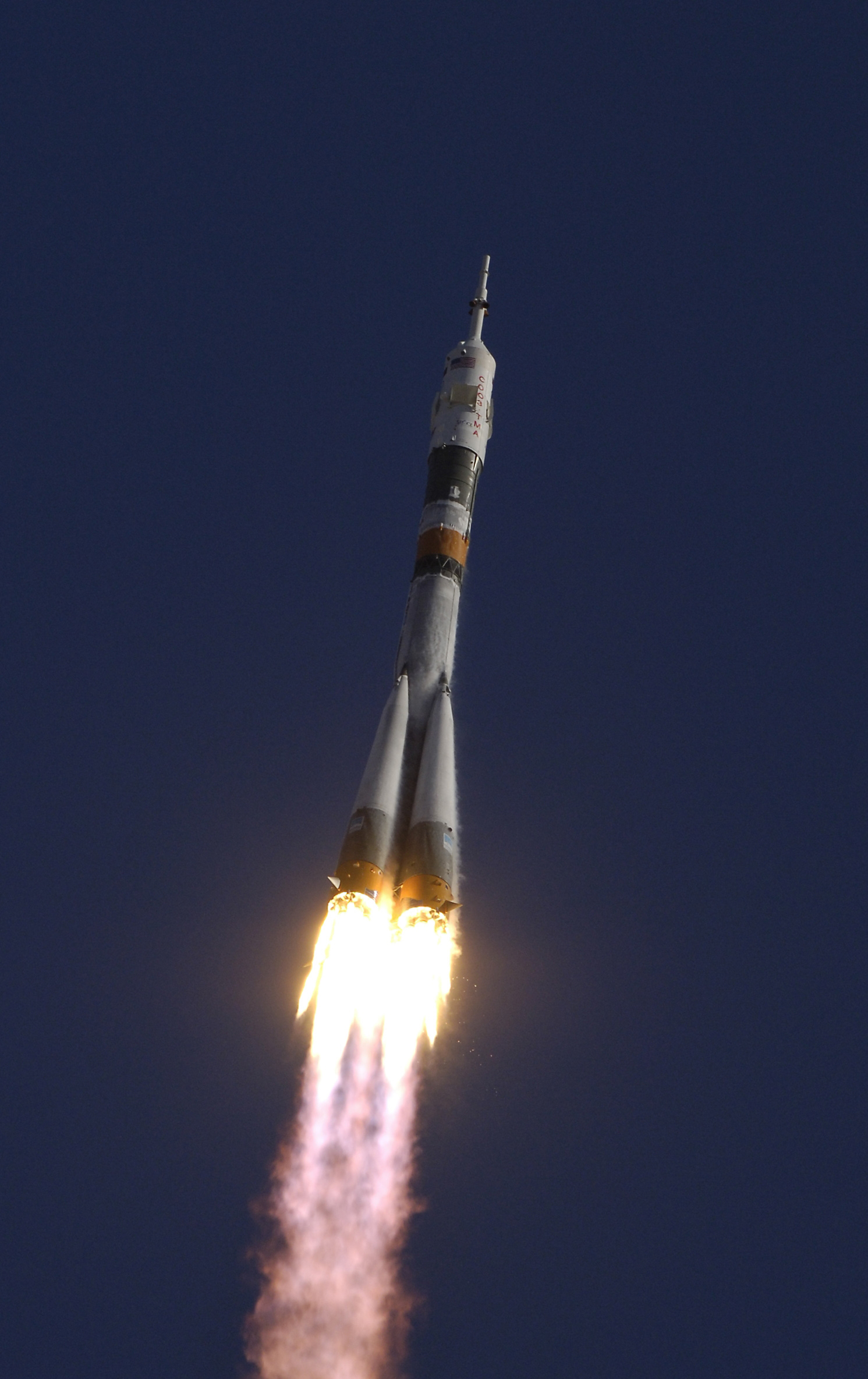
- Operator: Roscosmos
- COSPAR ID: 2006-040A
- SATCAT no.: 29400
- Mission duration: 215 days, 8 hours, 22 minutes

Spacecraft properties
- Spacecraft type: Soyuz-TMA 11F732
- Manufacturer: Energia
- Launch mass: 7,270 kilograms (16,030 lb)

Crew
- Crew size: 3
- Members: Mikhail Tyurin; Michael López-Alegría
- Launching: Anousheh Ansari
- Landing: Charles Simonyi
- Callsign: Vostok

Start of mission
- Launch date: 18 September 2006, 04:08 UTC
- Rocket: Soyuz-FG
- Launch site: Baikonur 1/5

End of mission
- Landing date: 21 April 2007, 12:31 UTC

Orbital parameters
- Reference system: Geocentric
- Regime: Low Earth
- Perigee altitude: 200 kilometres (120 mi)
- Apogee altitude: 242 kilometres (150 mi)
- Inclination: 51.67 degrees
- Period: 88.64 minutes

Docking with ISS
- Docking port: Zvezda aft
- Docking date: 20 September 2006; 05:21 UTC
- Undocking date: 10 October 2006; 19:14 UTC
- Time docked: 20d 13h 53m

Docking with ISS (Relocation)
- Docking port: Zarya nadir
- Docking date: 10 October 2006; 19:34 UTC
- Undocking date: 29 March 2007; 23:30 UTC
- Time docked: 170d 3h 56m

Docking with ISS (Relocation)
- Docking port: Zvezda aft
- Docking date: 29 March 2007; 23:54 UTC
- Undocking date: 21 April 2007; 09:11 UTC
- Time docked: 22d 9h 17m
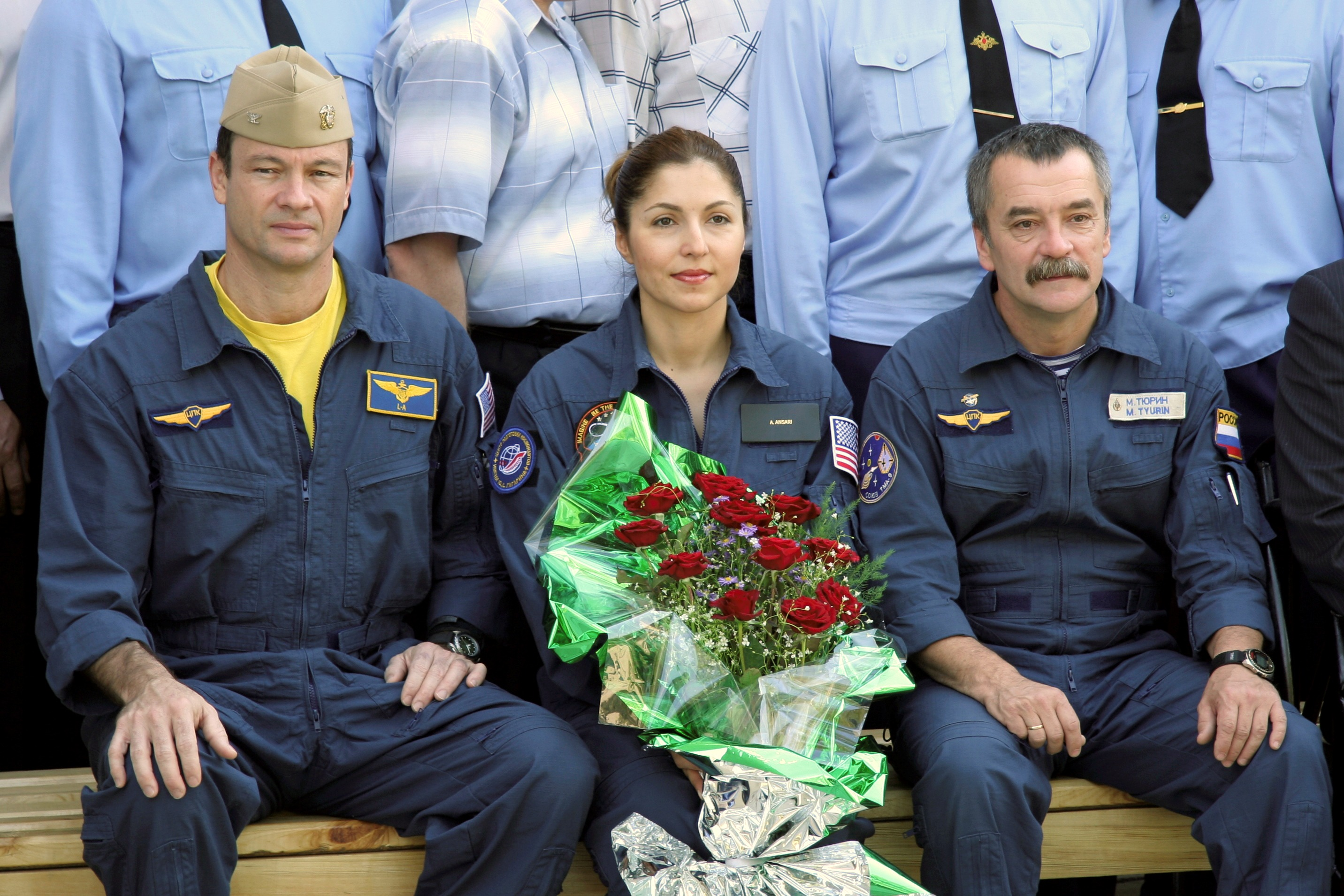
- Crew of Soyuz TMA-9: (l-r) López-Alegría, Ansari, Tyurin Soyuz programme (Crewed missions)

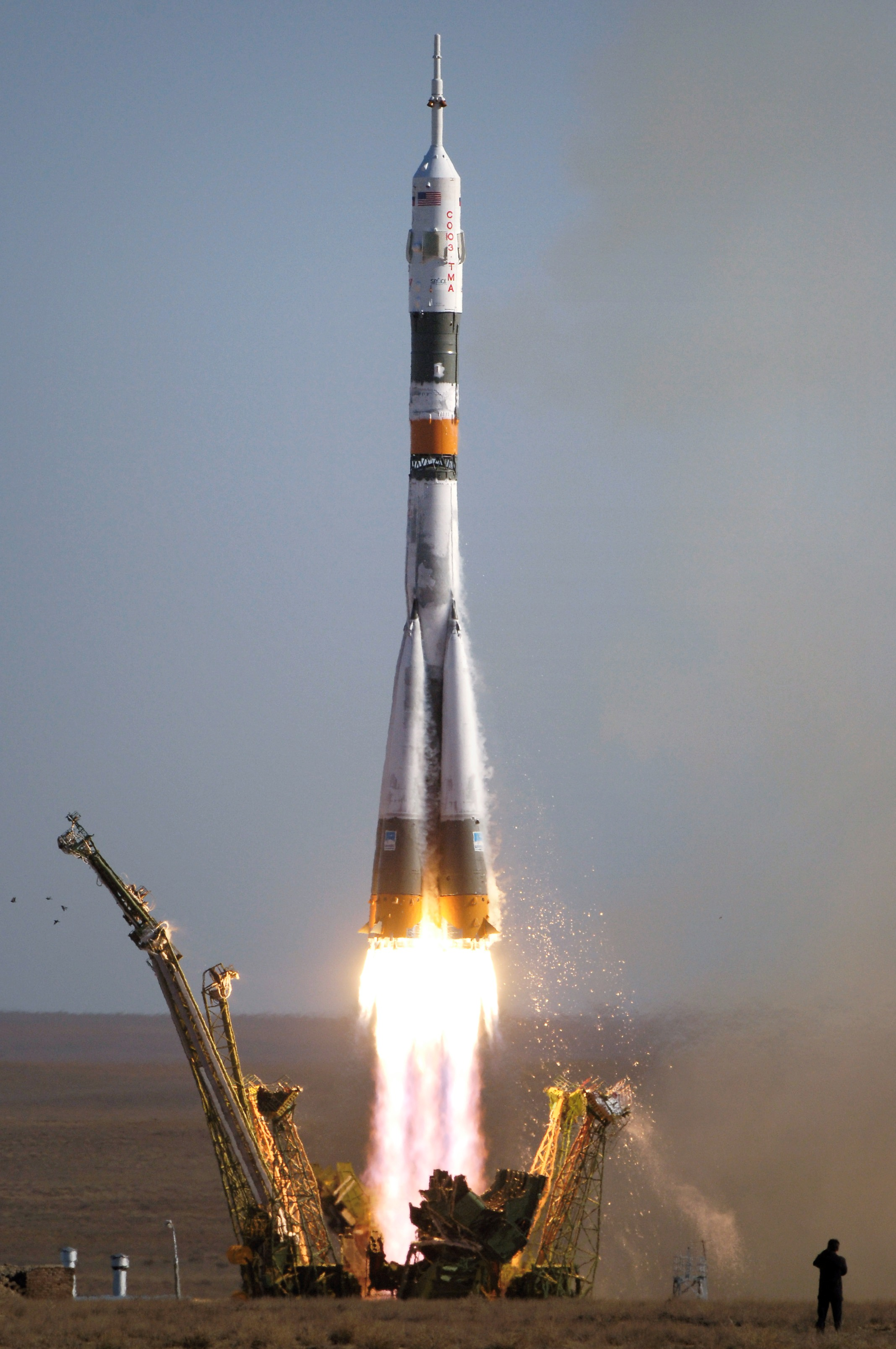
Soyuz TMA-9 launch.

Soyuz TMA-9 was a Soyuz mission to the International Space Station (ISS) launched by a Soyuz FG launch vehicle. It was a human spaceflight mission transporting personnel to and from the ISS. It launched from the Baikonur Cosmodrome on 18 September 2006 at 08:09 MSD (04:09 UTC), docked with the ISS at 09:21 MSD (05:21 UTC) on 20 September, and returned to Earth on 21 April 2007. Soyuz TMA-9 transported two-thirds of ISS Expedition 14 to the space station along with one "spaceflight participant" who performed several experiments on behalf of the European Space Agency.

== Crew ==
Position	Launching crew	Landing crew
Commander	(Russia) Mikhail Tyurin, Roscosmos; Expedition 14; Second spaceflight	
Flight Engineer	(United States) Michael López-Alegría, NASA; Expedition 14; Fourth (last NASA) spaceflight	
Spaceflight Participant	(Iran) / (United States) Anousheh Ansari, SA; Only spaceflight Tourist	(Hungary) / (United States) Charles Simonyi, SA; First spaceflight Tourist

=== Crew notes ===
Daisuke Enomoto was originally scheduled to be the spaceflight participant, but on 21 August 2006, he was determined to be unfit for the flight for medical reasons, and replaced by Anousheh Ansari, his back-up crew member.

== Docking with ISS ==
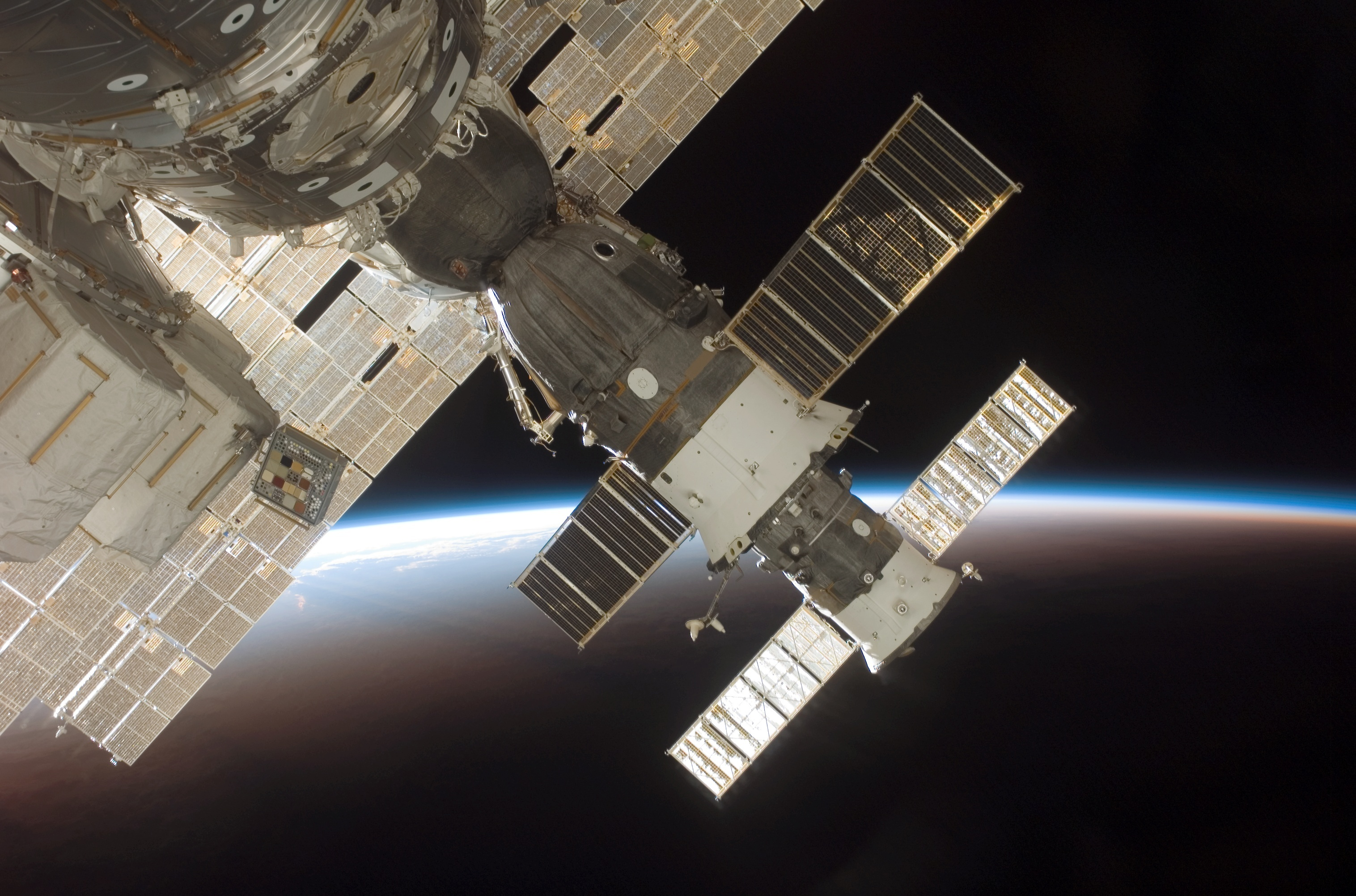
The docked Expedition 13 / Soyuz TMA-9 (foreground) and Progress 22 resupply vehicle are featured in this image photographed by an STS-116 crewmember from a window on the International Space Station while Space Shuttle Discovery was docked with the station in December 2006. The blackness of space and Earth's horizon provide the backdrop for the scene.

- Docked to ISS: 20 September 2006, 05:21 UTC (to aft port of Zvezda)
- Undocking from ISS: 10 October 2006 19:14 UTC (from aft port of Zvezda)
- Docking to ISS: 10 October 2006 19:34 UTC (to nadir port of Zarya)
- Undocking from ISS: 29 March 2007 23:30 UTC (from nadir port of Zarya)
- Docking to ISS: 29 March 2007 23:54 UTC (to aft port of Zvezda)
- Undocking from ISS: 21 April 2007 09:11 UTC (from aft port of Zvezda)

== Mission highlights ==
Soyuz TMA-9, known within the International Space Station program as ISS Soyuz 13, was the 32nd crewed flight to the ISS. It is of note because for three days, from 18–21 September 2006, it marked the first time since before the Columbia accident that twelve humans have been in space simultaneously; three aboard the International Space Station (Expedition 13), three aboard Soyuz TMA-9, and six aboard Space Shuttle Atlantis, flying mission STS-115.

The capsule launched from Baikonur Cosmodrome in Kazakhstan on a Soyuz-FG rocket at 09:08 MDS (04:08 UTC) on Monday 18 September 2006. It docked with the ISS on Wednesday 20 September to begin a six-month stay on the orbiting laboratory.

Anousheh Ansari, the spaceflight participant launched by TMA-9, returned to Earth alongside Commander Pavel Vinogradov and Flight Engineer Jeffrey Williams of the Expedition 13 crew aboard Soyuz TMA-8 on 29 September 2006 at 01:13 UTC. Undocking from the ISS took place at 21:53 UTC on 28 September. López-Alegría and Tyurin undocked from ISS on 21 April 2007, 09:11 UTC, and landed at 12:31:30 UTC, after a seven-month stay on the station.
