= Mikhail Tyurin =

Russian cosmonaut (born 1960)

- Михаил Тюрин
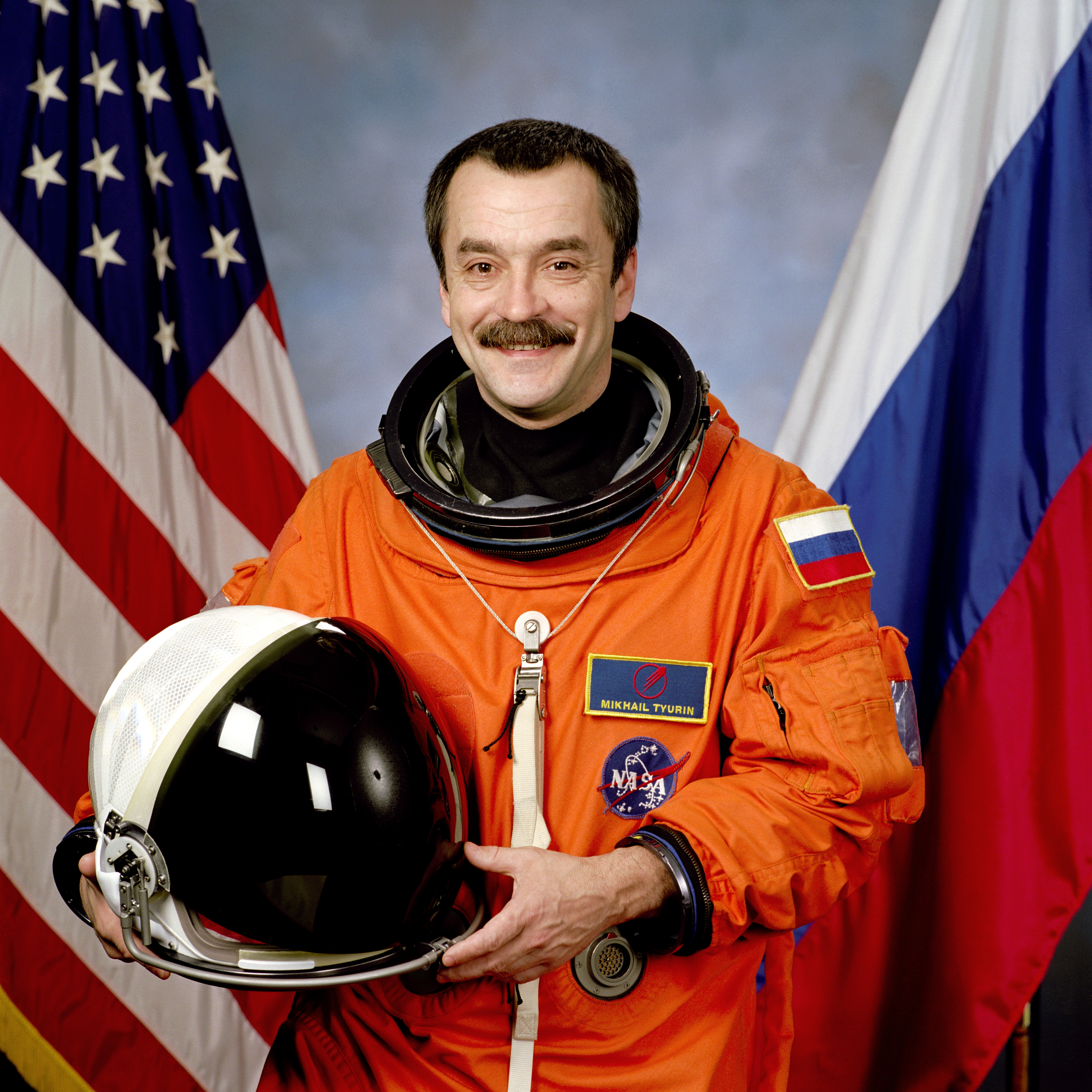
- Born: March 2, 1960 (age 66); Kolomna, Russia, USSR
- Occupation: Mechanical Engineer
- Awards: Hero of the Russian Federation
- Space career

Roscosmos cosmonaut
- Status: Retired
- Time in space: 532 days, 2 hours, 50 minutes
- Selection: 1994 Cosmonaut Group
- Total EVAs: 5
- Total EVA time: 25h, 31m
- Missions: STS-105/STS-108 (Expedition 3), Soyuz TMA-9 (Expedition 14), Soyuz TMA-11M (Expedition 38/39)
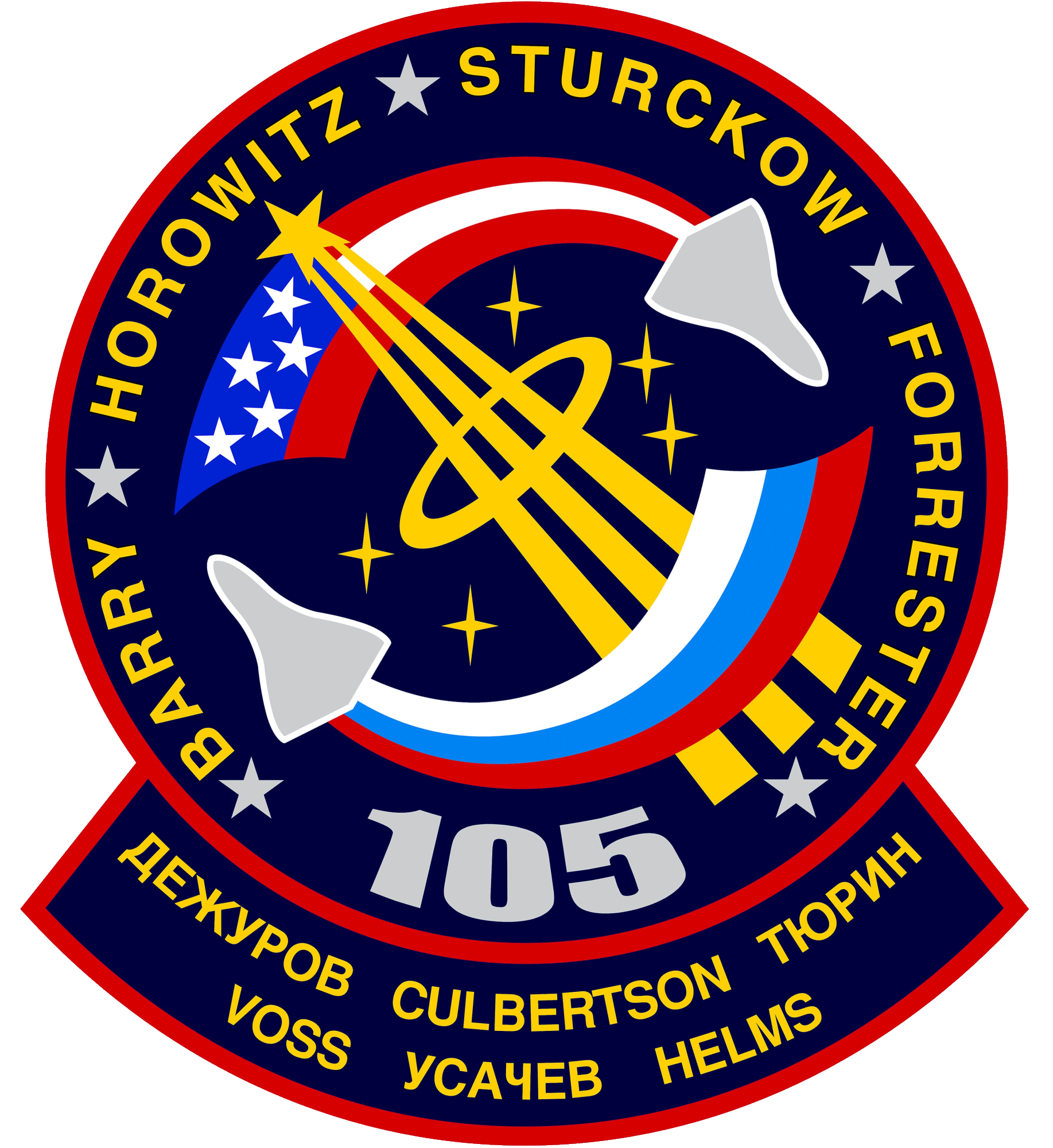
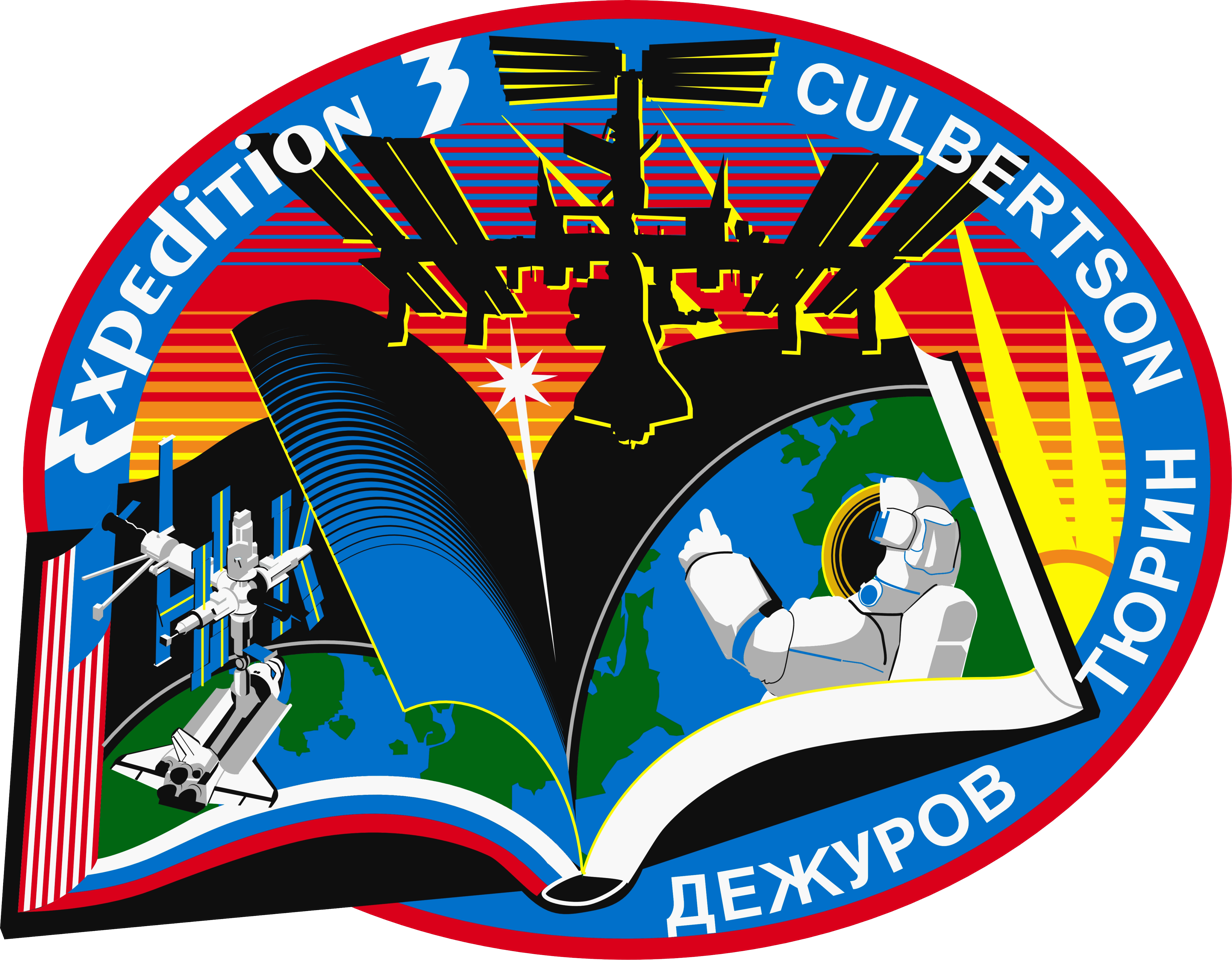
- Mission insignia
- Retired: January 18, 2016

Mikhail Vladislavovich Tyurin (Russian: Михаил Владиславович Тюрин; born March 2, 1960) is a former Russian cosmonaut who flew three missions to the International Space Station and completed five spacewalks during his career. He was awarded the title Hero of the Russian Federation for his work as a cosmonaut.

== Personal data ==
Michael Tyurin lives in Korolev, a small city outside Moscow. He was born March 2, 1960, in Kolomna, Russia (then part of the Soviet Union) (about 60 miles from Moscow) where his parents still reside. He is married to Tatiana Anatoleyvna Tyurina. They have a daughter, Alexandra, born in 1982. He enjoys sailing in his free time.

== Education ==
He graduated from the Moscow Aviation Institute in 1984 with a degree in engineering and a specialization in creating mathematical models related to mechanical flight. He is currently doing graduate work in his field of research.

== Experience ==
After graduating from the Aviation Institute he began working at the Energia corporation as an engineer. The main subjects of his job have been dynamics, ballistics, and software development. His personal scientific research is connected with the psychological aspects of cosmonauts' training for the manual control of spacecraft motion.

== Awards ==
- By decree of the President of the Russian Federation dated April 12, 2003, he was awarded the title of Hero of the Russian Federation "For courage and heroism shown during space flight on the International Space Station." On the same day, by another decree, he was awarded the title of "Pilot-Cosmonaut of the Russian Federation".
- He was awarded the Order For Merit to the Fatherland, 3rd degree (2016).
- He was awarded the Order For Merit to the Fatherland, 4th degree (2008).
- Medal "For Merits in Space Exploration" (April 12, 2011) — for great achievements in the field of research, exploration and use of outer space, long-term conscientious work, active social activities.
- Alexey Leonov Medal (Kemerovo Region, 2015) — for five perfect spacewalks.

== Cosmonaut career ==
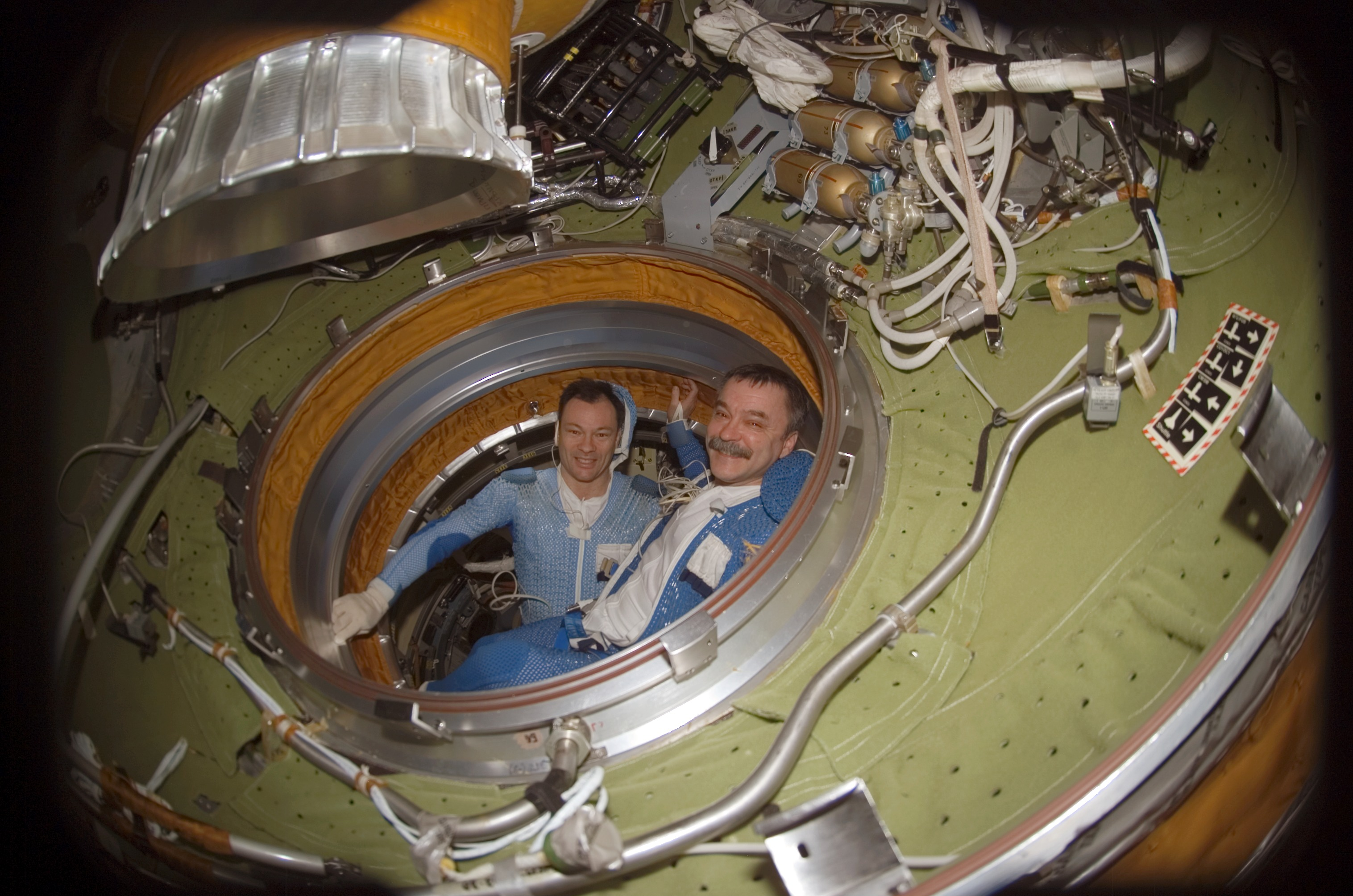
Mikhail Tyurin (right) and Michael E. Lopez-Alegria conduct pre-spacewalk operations in the Pirs Docking Compartment

In 1994 he was selected to begin cosmonaut training, and in 1998 he started training as a flight engineer for the Expedition 3 crew. He also served as a backup crew member for the first ISS mission.

=== Expedition 3 ===
Tyurin lived and worked aboard the International Space Station as part of the Expedition 3 crew. Space Shuttle Discovery carrying Tyurin and six other crewmembers on STS-105 mission blasted off to space from the Kennedy Space Center (KSC) on August 10, 2001. The shuttle docked with the ISS on 12 August at 18:41 UTC. Tyurin spent approximately 4 months aboard the station as flight engineer 1. During the long-duration mission, the Expedition 3 crew enjoyed a unique view of the 2001 Leonid meteor storm. At the end of the stay Expedition 3 crewmembers, NASA astronaut Frank Culbertson, Tyurin, and cosmonaut Vladimir Dezhurov returned to Earth on board Space Shuttle Endeavour. Endeavour's STS-108 mission delivered the Expedition 4 crew to the ISS and landed at KSC on December 17, 2001.

=== Expedition 14 ===
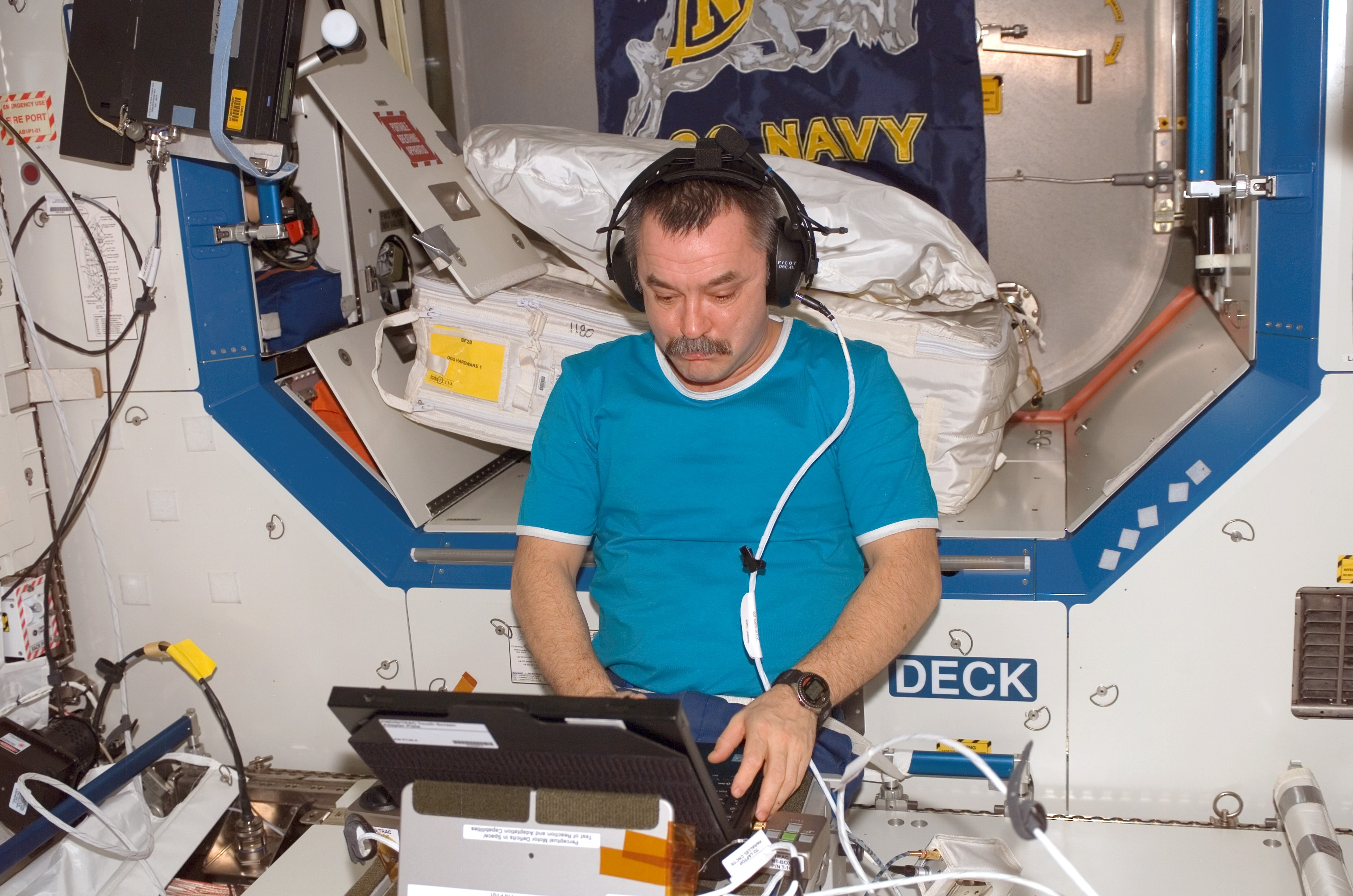
Mikhail Tyurin, Expedition 14 flight engineer works with the Test of Reaction and Adaptation Capabilities (TRAC) experiment in the Destiny laboratory of the ISS.

Tyurin with NASA astronaut Michael Lopez-Alegria and spaceflight participant Anousheh Ansari lifted off on board the Soyuz TMA-9 spacecraft from the Baikonur Cosmodrome on 18 September 2006 at 04:08 UTC, to the ISS. The spacecraft docked with the ISS on September 20 at 05:21 UTC following two days of autonomous flight. Tyurin served as the Soyuz commander, and after docking with the ISS they exchanged with the resident crew on board ISS and became the fourteenth station crew, Expedition 14. Tyurin spent 215 days aboard the International Space Station as a flight engineer. The Soyuz TMA-9 capsule carrying Tyurin, Lopez-Alegria and spaceflight participant Charles Simonyi landed southwest of Karaganda, Kazakhstan on 21 April 2007 12:30 UTC.

=== Expedition 38/39 ===
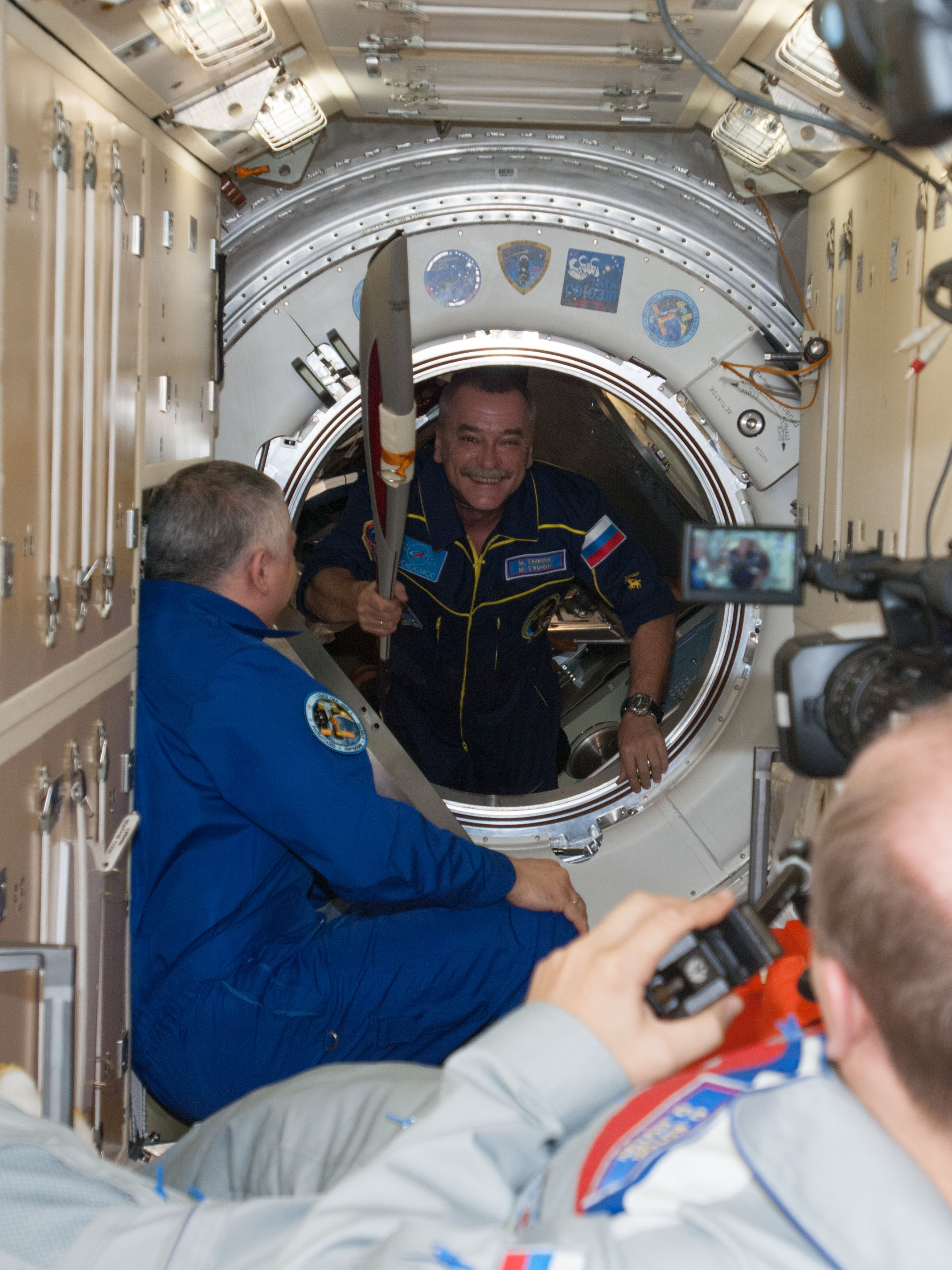
Expedition 38 Flight Engineer Mikhail Tyurin seen holding the Olympic torch as he enters the ISS.

Tyurin was commander of flight Soyuz TMA-11M, which docked with the ISS on November 7, 2013. The Soyuz FG rocket carrying Tyurin, American astronaut Rick Mastracchio and Japanese astronaut Koichi Wakata lifted off from the Baikonur Cosmodrome at 04:14 GMT and docked with the ISS six hours later. The Soyuz TMA-11M crew carried a torch for the 2014 Sochi Olympics. Once at the ISS, Tyurin, Mastracchio and Wakata met Fyodor Yurchikhin, Karen Nyberg, Luca Parmitano, Oleg Kotov, Sergey Ryazansky, Michael Hopkins. This was the first time since October 2009 that nine people have served together aboard the station without a space shuttle being docked to the orbital station.

During his stay at the space station, Tyurin was involved in studying the cardiovascular and neurological systems as a part of understanding how human body adapts to zero gravity.

Tyurin returned to Earth on May 14, 2014, after 188 days in space. The Soyuz crew carrying Tyurin touched down southeast of Dzhezkazgan in Kazakhstan at 01:57 UTC.

=== Spacewalks ===
As of December 2025, Tyurin has performed five career spacewalks. Tyurin's EVA time through four spacewalks is 25 hours and 31 minutes.

Tyurin conducted his first three career spacewalks during the Expedition 3 mission to the ISS. On October 8, 2001, Tyurin and Dezhurov ventured outside ISS to mark the 100th spacewalk to be carried out by Russian cosmonauts. The main objective of the spacewalk was to outfit the Pirs Docking Compartment and make connections between that newly arrived compartment and the Zvezda module. The spacewalkers installed a cable that allows space walk radio communications between the two station sections. They also installed handrails on the new compartment and an exterior ladder that will be used to help spacewalkers leave Pirs' hatch. Tyurin and Dezhurov also installed a Strela cargo crane onto the station. The spacewalk lasted 4 hours and 58 minutes ending at 19:21 UTC.

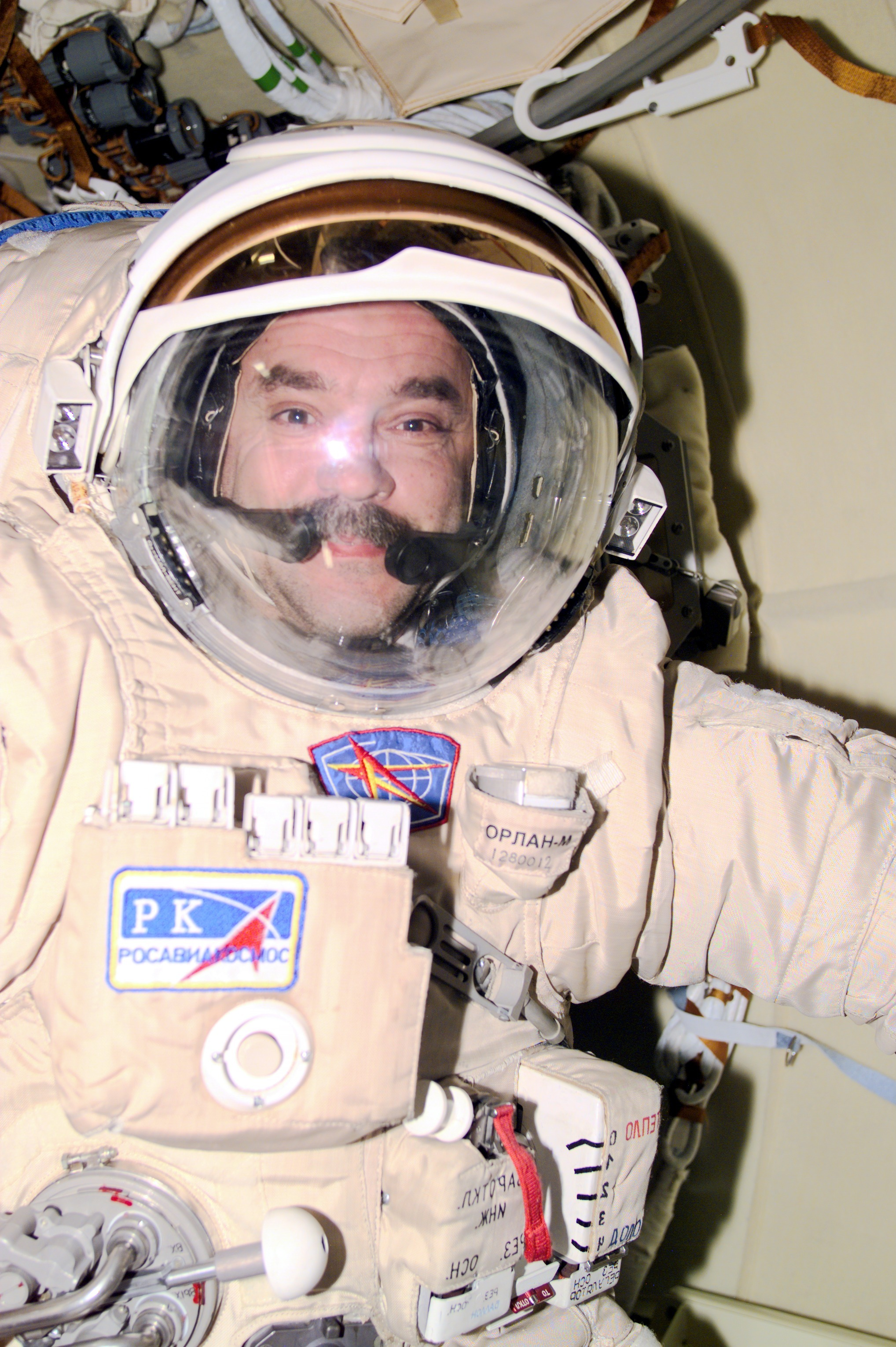
Mikhail Tyurin wearing an Orlan spacesuit.

On October 15, 2001, Tyurin performed his second career spacewalk. The two spacewalkers returned to space outside the ISS from the Pirs airlock. Dezhurov and Tyurin installed Russian commercial experiments on the exterior of Pirs. Among the experiments is a set of investigations of how various materials react to the space environment over a long time. Called MPAC-SEEDS, the investigation is housed in three briefcase-sized containers. The spacewalk lasted 5 hours and 52 minutes.

On December 3, 2001, Tyurin conducted his third career spacewalk. Dressed in Orlan spacesuits, Tyurin and Dezhurov floated out of the Pirs airlock at 13:20 UTC. Dezhurov and Tyurin used a cutting tool to remove an errant rubber seal that had prevented a Progress resupply ship from firmly docking with the ISS. The two spacewalkers also took pictures of the debris, which was a rubberized seal from the previous cargo ship, and of the docking interface. The spacewalk lasted 2 hours and 46 minutes.

On November 22, 2006, Tyurin performed his fourth career spacewalk starting at 23:17 UTC. The spacewalk had been delayed from its scheduled 20:00 UTC start time due to a cooling issue in Tyurin's suit. Tyurin got out of the suit and straightened a suspect hose which apparently had become kinked. During the spacewalk, Tyurin hit a golf ball from the exterior of the Pirs airlock. This "experiment" was sponsored by a Toronto-based commercial company, Element 21, which manufactures golf clubs made of scandium. The ball weighs just 3 grams, compared with 48 grams for a standard golf ball. At that weight, it was unlikely to damage any station components which might accidentally have been hit. The two spacewalkers next task was to inspect a Kurs antenna on the Progress M-58 spacecraft that had docked on October 26, 2006. Tyurin and Lopez-Alegria moved to the rear of the Zvezda module and photographed the antenna. Since it was still fully extended, Tyurin used a screwdriver to release a latch and tried to retract the antenna. Russian flight controllers also tried to retract it by activating a motor. Neither succeeded, and the task was abandoned. Next they relocated a WAL antenna, that was to guide the unpiloted European cargo carrier, the Automated Transfer Vehicle, to dock with the station. The two spacewalkers also installed a BTN neutron experiment, which characterizes charged and neutral particles in low Earth orbit. Two thermal covers from the BTN were jettisoned before Tyurin and Lopez-Alegria returned to the Pirs airlock at 04:55 UTC on 23 November. The spacewalk lasted 5 hours and 38 minutes.

== See also ==
- List of Heroes of the Russian Federation
