= Daisuke Nakagawa =

Japanese shogi player (born 1968)

- Native name: 中川大輔
- Born: July 13, 1968 (age 57)
- Hometown: Sendai
- Nationality: Japanese

Career
- Achieved professional status: October 19, 1987 (aged 19)
- Badge Number: 184
- Rank: 8-dan
- Teacher: Kunio Yonenaga (9-dan)
- Tournaments won: 1
- Meijin class: C1
- Ryūō class: 5

Websites
- JSA profile page

Daisuke Nakagawa (中川 大輔, Nakagawa Daisuke; born July 13, 1968) is a Japanese professional shogi player ranked 8-dan. He is a former executive director of the Japan Shogi Association.

== Early life, amateur shogi and apprenticeship ==
Daisuke Nakagawa was born in Sendai, Japan, on July 13, 1968. As a junior high school, he won the 7th Junior High School Student Meijin Tournament in 1982, and the following year was accepted into the Japan Shogi Association's apprentice school at the rank of 6-kyū under the guidance of shogi professional Kunio Yonenaga. He was promoted to 1-dan in 1985, and was awarded full professional status and the rank of 4-dan in October 1987.

== Shogi professional ==
=== Promotion history ===
Nakagawa's promotion history is as follows:

- 6-kyū: 1983
- 1-dan: 1985
- 4-dan: October 19, 1987
- 5-dan: November 27, 1990
- 6-dan: June 28, 1994
- 7-dan: October 20, 2000
- 8-dan: December 11, 2009

=== Titles and other championships ===
Nakagawa has won one non-major-title championship during his career: the 11th Young Lions tournament in 1987.

=== Awards and honors ===
Nakagawa received the JSA's "Shogi Honor Fighting-spirit Award" in December 2011 for winning 600 official games as a professional.

== JSA executive ==
Nakagawa has served on the Japan Shogi Association's board of directors on multiple occasions. He was first elected as a director at the association's 58th General Meeting on May 25, 2007, and was re-elected to the same position on May 26, 2009.

In May 2011, Nakagawa was selected to be an executive director at the JSA's 62nd General Meeting, but resigned his position for personal reasons in December of that same year.

At the JSA's 64th General Meeting in June 2013, Nakagawa was once again selected to be a JSA executive director. He was re-elected to the same position in 2015, but was one of three members of the board voted out of office by the JSA membership at an emergency meeting held in February 2017 for their involvement in the 29th Ryūō challenger controversy.
