= Daisuke Ueda =

Japanese male model (born 1987)

Daisuke Ueda (上田 太輔, Ueda Daisuke; born 25 May 1987) is a Japanese male model.

== Career ==
Daisuke Ueda was the first model in Asia to appear on the cover of Vogue Hommes Japan, photographed by Steven Klein with the artistic supervision of Nicola Formichetti. He has also been a spokesperson for the clothing company Gap and was in two campaigns for Dolce & Gabbana.

== Agencies ==
- Donna Inc - Tokyo
- Female Models - Tokyo
- New York Model Management
- Nathalie Models - Paris
- UNIQUE DENMARK - Copenhagen
- D1 Model Management - London
- Promad Model Agency - Hamburg
- I LOVE Model Management - Milan
- Jill Model Management - Antwerp
- Sight Management - Barcelona
