= Element 21 (company) =

Canadian manufacturer of golf and fishing equipment

Element 21 (E21)
- Type: Public
- Headquarters: Toronto, Ontario, Canada
- Key people: Nataliya Hearn (President and CEO)
- Products: Golf clubs, fishing rods
- Website: www.e21golf.com

Element 21 is a golf and fishing equipment manufacturing company based in Toronto, Ontario, Canada. The company made headlines in 2006 when they paid the Russian Federal Space Agency to send a golf ball into space.

The company takes its name from scandium, the 21st element of the periodic table, alloys of which are used to make golf clubs and fishing rods. Element 21 claims that their use of scandium improves performance compared with that of other commonly used metals.
