= Michael López-Alegría =

Spanish-American astronaut (born 1958)

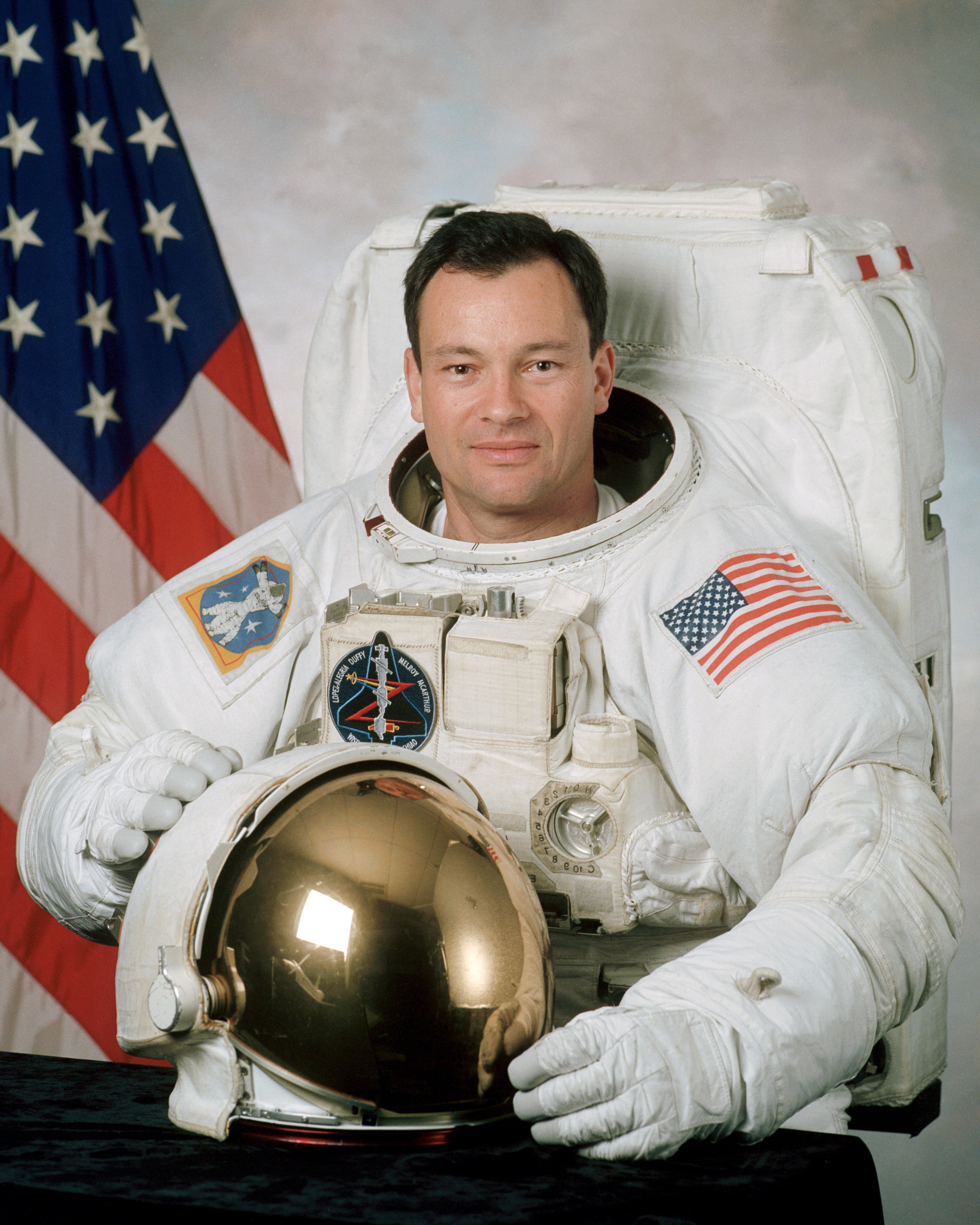
- Lopez in March 2000
- Born: Miguel Eladio López Alegría; May 30, 1958 (age 68); Madrid, Spain
- Education: United States Naval Academy (BS); Naval Postgraduate School (MS)
- Space career

NASA astronaut
- Rank: Captain, USN
- Time in space: 296 days, 16 hours and 15 minutes
- Selection: NASA Group 14 (1992)
- Total EVAs: 10
- Total EVA time: 67h 41m
- Missions: STS-73; STS-92; STS-113; Soyuz TMA-9 (Expedition 14); Axiom Mission 1; Axiom Mission 3
- Mission insignia
- Retired: March 12, 2012

Michael López-Alegría (born Miguel Eladio López Alegría; born May 30, 1958) is an astronaut, test pilot and commercial astronaut with dual nationality, American and Spanish; a veteran of three Space Shuttle missions and one International Space Station mission. He is known for having performed ten spacewalks so far in his career, presently holding the second longest all-time EVA duration record (first among NASA astronauts) and having the fifth-longest spaceflight of any American at the length of 215 days; this time was spent on board the ISS from September 18, 2006, to April 21, 2007. López-Alegría commanded Axiom-1, the first all-private team of commercial astronaut mission to the International Space Station, which launched on April 8, 2022, and spent just over 17 days in Earth's orbit.

== Background ==
Son of a Spanish father and an American mother, López-Alegría was born in Madrid, Spain and raised in Mission Viejo, California. After graduating from Mission Viejo High School, López-Alegría joined the United States Navy, where he earned a Bachelor of Science degree in systems engineering in 1980 from the U.S. Naval Academy, and a Master of Science degree in Aeronautical Engineering in 1988 from the U.S. Naval Postgraduate School. Designated a Naval Aviator in 1981, his aviation experience in the Navy was as an instructor pilot in Training Squadron 2 (VT-2) at Naval Air Station Whiting Field near Pensacola, Florida, at Fleet Air Reconnaissance Squadron 2 (VQ-2) in Rota, Spain, and the Naval Air Test Center at NAS Patuxent River, Maryland. He was the first EP-3E pilot to be selected for U.S. Naval Test Pilot School. He is a graduate of Harvard Kennedy School's Program for Senior Executives in National and International Security. He is fluent in English, Spanish, French, and Russian.

His son Nicolas starred alongside López-Alegría in 2006 in Mira La Luna (directed by Eduard Bosch). A second documentary, directed by Manuel Huerga, Son And Moon, was released in Spanish theaters in 2009 featuring astronauts Mikhail Tyurin, Sunita Williams, and him.

== Mission record ==
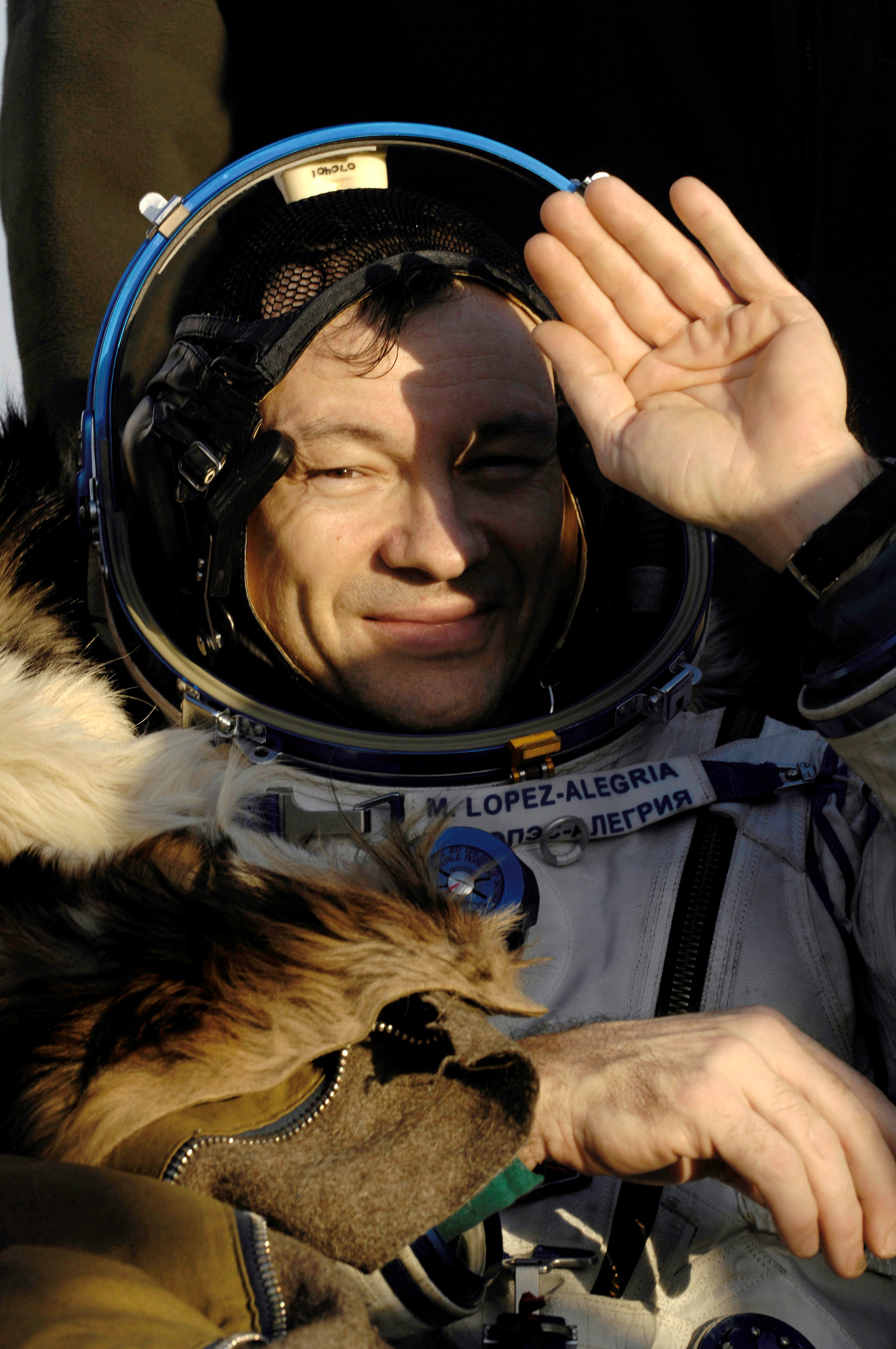
López-Alegría after landing of Soyuz TMA-9 spacecraft in Kazakhstan.

López-Alegría's first space mission was STS-73 in 1995; for several years afterwards he led NASA's International Space Station (ISS) Crew Operations office before returning to space aboard STS-92 in 2000 and STS-113 in 2002. During flight STS-92, he tested the SAFER jet backpack with fellow astronaut Jeff Wisoff, flying up to 50 feet from the spacecraft.

López-Alegría served as an aquanaut on the first NEEMO (NASA Extreme Environment Mission Operations) crew aboard the Aquarius underwater laboratory in October 2001.

On September 20, 2006, López-Alegría docked with the ISS as commander of Expedition 14, having taken off from Baikonur, Kazakhstan on September 18, onboard Soyuz TMA-9. On Expedition 14, he performed five spacewalks. On April 21, 2007, he undocked from the ISS and returned to Earth.

López-Alegría holds the all-time American record for number of EVAs (10) and total EVA duration (67 hours and 40 minutes). The previous record holder, Jerry L. Ross, had a total of 9 EVAs with a duration of 58 hours and 18 minutes. López-Alegría is the second most experienced spacewalker overall, behind Russia's Anatoly Solovyev. On April 2, 2007, López-Alegría set the record for the longest space mission of any American astronaut. When he landed on April 21, his time in space on a single mission was 215 days (the longest space mission on record is that of Valeriy Polyakov, who spent 438 days aboard the Russian space station Mir in 1994 and 1995).

== List of EVAs ==
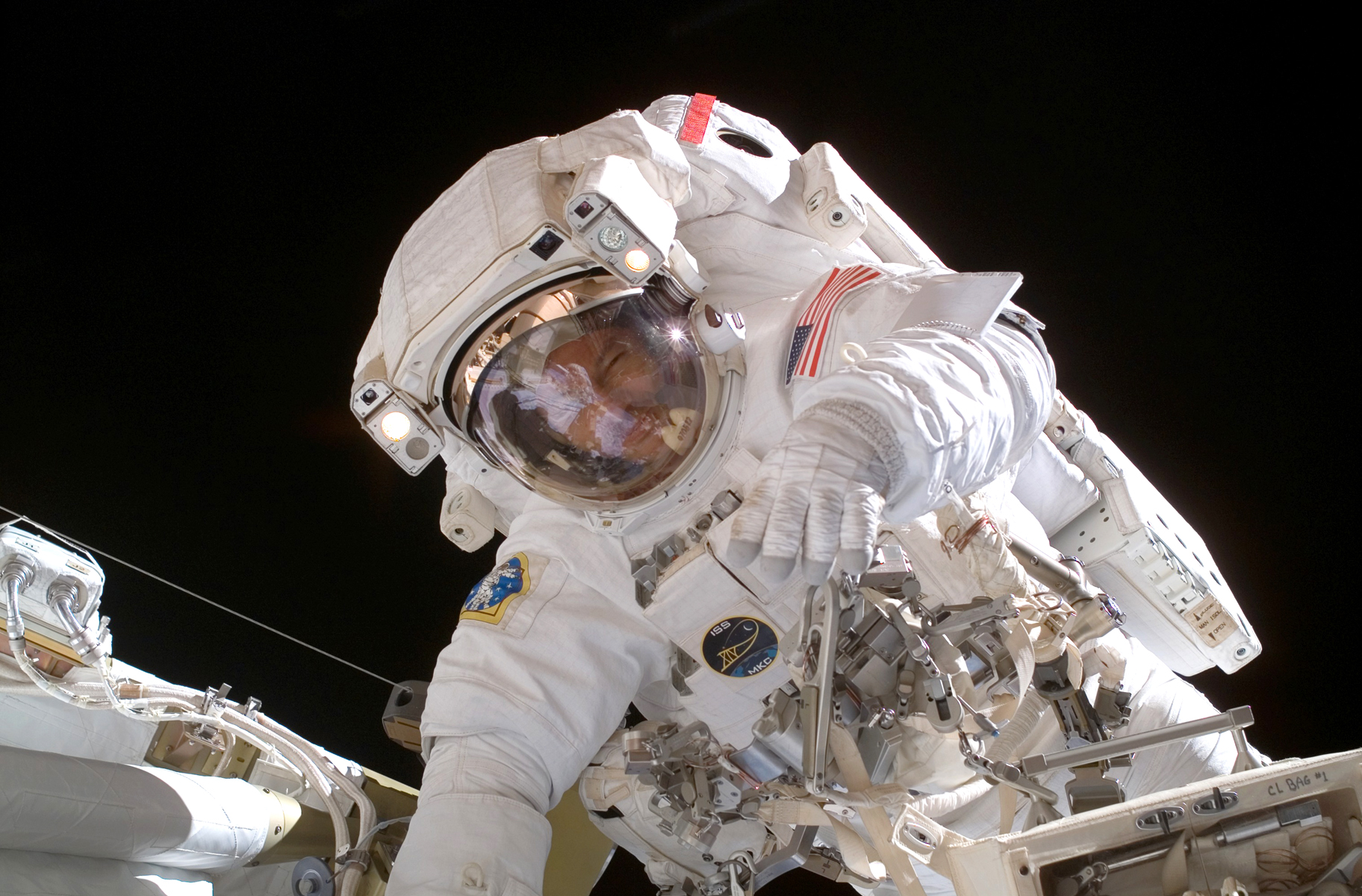
López-Alegría conducting EVA during Expedition 14.

- 2000-10-16 7:07 hours STS-92, EVA 2
- 2000-10-18 6:56 hours STS-92, EVA 4
- 2002-11-26 6:45 hours STS-113, EVA 1
- 2002-11-28 6:10 hours STS-113, EVA 2
- 2002-11-30 7:00 hours STS-113, EVA 3
- 2006-11-22 7:39 hours ISS Expedition 14, EVA 1
- 2007-01-31 7:55 hours ISS Expedition 14, EVA 2
- 2007-02-04 7:11 hours ISS Expedition 14, EVA 3
- 2007-02-07 6:39 hours ISS Expedition 14, EVA 4
- 2007-02-22 6:18 hours ISS Expedition 14, EVA 5

At the end of his ISS mission, he commanded the longest flight by a Soyuz spacecraft, making Expedition 14 the longest expedition thus far. López-Alegría broke the record for longest spaceflight by an American astronaut.

== Post-NASA career ==
López-Alegría retired from NASA on March 12, 2012 and served as the President of the Commercial Spaceflight Federation through the end of 2014. López-Alegría is an independent consultant to traditional and commercial space companies, serves on several advisory boards and committees to public and private organizations, and is engaged in public speaking domestically and internationally. He is based in Washington, DC.

In 2017, López-Alegría joined Axiom Space as director of Business Development. He flew in space again in 2022 as commander of Axiom Mission 1, the first Axiom Space Crew Dragon mission to the International Space Station.

López-Alegría was the commander of Axiom Mission 3, which launched on 18 January 2024.. This mission was the first European commercial astronaut mission to the International Space Station. The four-person crew included astronauts representing Italy, Türkiye, and Sweden, with López-Alegria representing the US and Spain. The mission launched on January 18, 2024, and, concluded with the crew's return to Earth on February 9, 2024.

== Awards and decorations ==
| National Defense Service Medal with one award star |
| NASA Space Flight Medal with three oak leaf clusters |
| Medal "For Merit in Space Exploration" |

== See also ==
- Hispanics in the United States Naval Academy
- List of Hispanic astronauts

| Preceded by Pavel Vinogradov | ISS Expedition Commander; July 6, 2006 to April 21, 2007 | Succeeded by Fyodor Yurchikhin |
