= List of Egyptian scientists =

This is a list of notable Egyptian scientists organized by the alphabetical order.

== List ==
- Abbas El Gamal
- Abu Kamil
- al-Qalqashandi
- Ahmad Fakhri
- Ahmed Kamal
- Ahmed Shafik
- Ahmed Zewail
- Ahmes
- Ali Moustafa Mosharafa
- Al-Kum al-Rishi
- Amany Fekry
- Amenhotep (official)
- Boshra Salem
- Essam E. Khalil
- Essam Heggy
- Farouk El-Baz
- Faten Zahran Mohammed
- Fawzia Fahim
- Gamal Hemdan
- Hamed Gohar
- Harkhebi
- Hatim Zaghloul
- Hesham Sallam
- Hesy-Ra
- Hussein Zedan
- Ibrahim Abouleish
- Ibn Yunus
- Jehane Ragai
- Kamal el-Mallakh
- Karam Soliman
- Labib Habachi
- Maha Ashour-Abdalla
- Magdi Yacoub
- Mahmoud Abdel-Aty
- Mohamed M. Atalla
- Mona Mostafa Mohamed
- Mona K. Marei
- Mostafa Kamal Tolba
- Mohamed Shehata
- N. Hashem
- Nagwa El-Badri
- Nazli Gad-El-Mawla
- Payeftjauemawyneith
- Penthu
- Peseshet
- Psamtikseneb
- Rashika El Ridi
- Reda R. Mankbadi
- Rana el Kaliouby
- Rushdi Said
- Sameera Moussa
- Samir Amin
- Sara Sabry
- Selim Hassan
- Shahinaz Gadalla
- Taher ElGamal
- Tahani Amer
- Yehia El-Mashad

== See also ==
- List of Egyptians
