= Amany =

Amany is a feminine given name. Notable people with the name include:

- Amany Ali, Egyptian Paralympic powerlifter
- Amany Fekry, Egyptian physical chemist
- Amany Lubis, Indonesian Islamic scholar
- Amany Rashad, Egyptian football player
