= Mário Ferreira =

Portuguese businessman and entrepreneur (born 1968)

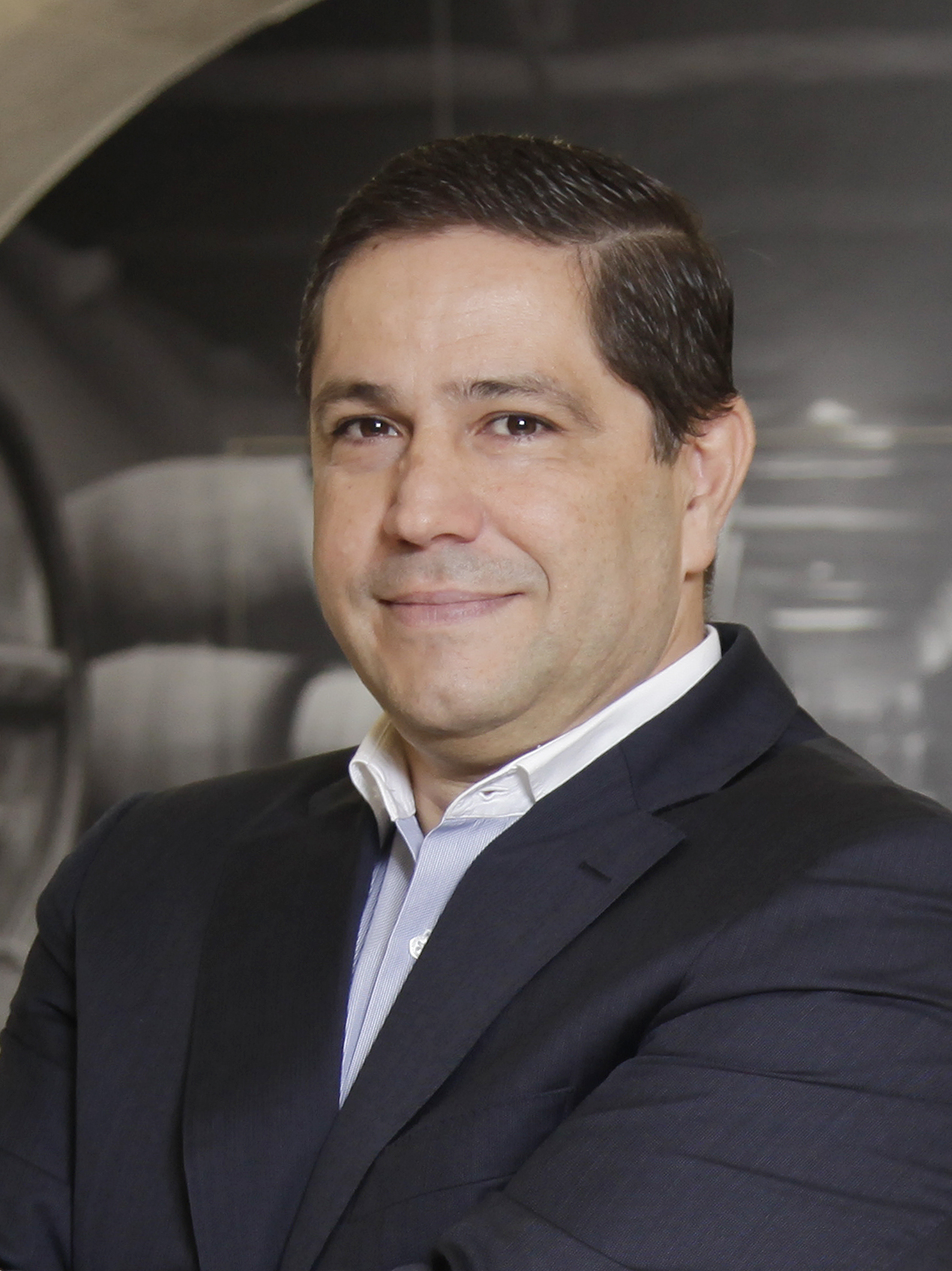
- Ferreira in 2015
- Born: Mário Nuno dos Santos Ferreira; 1968 (54–55 years old)
- Occupations: Businessman and entrepreneur
- Known for: First Portuguese to enter space

Mário Nuno dos Santos Ferreira (born 1968) is a Portuguese businessman and entrepreneur. He is the chairman of Media Capital, a major Portuguese media company with holdings including TVI and CNN Portugal. In March 2024, he acquired a 4.6% stake in Savannah Resources which is developing Europe’s largest lithium mine in northern Portugal.

On 4 August 2022, as part of the Blue Origin NS-22 mission, Mário Ferreira lifted off from Corn Ranch, Texas to space on board of New Shepard. He became the first Portuguese person to travel to space.
