= Blue Origin NS-22 =

2022 American crewed sub-orbital spaceflight

- Mission type: Sub-orbital human spaceflight
- Mission duration: 10 minutes, 20 seconds
- Apogee: 107 km (66 mi)

Spacecraft properties
- Spacecraft: RSS First Step
- Manufacturer: Blue Origin

Crew
- Crew size: 6
- Members: Coby Cotton; Mário Ferreira; Vanessa O'Brien; Clint Kelly III; Sara Sabry; Steve Young

Start of mission
- Launch date: August 4, 2022, 8:56:07 am CDT (13:56:07 UTC)
- Rocket: New Shepard (NS4)
- Launch site: Corn Ranch, LS-1
- Contractor: Blue Origin

End of mission
- Landing date: August 4, 2022, 9:06:27 am CDT (14:06:27 UTC)
- Landing site: Corn Ranch
- Blue Origin NS-22 mission patch New Shepard crewed flights

Blue Origin NS-22 was a sub-orbital spaceflight mission, operated by Blue Origin, which launched on August 4, 2022, using the New Shepard rocket. It was Blue Origin's sixth flight to carry passengers and the twenty-second overall to go into space.

== Passengers ==
The passengers of NS-22 were nicknamed "Titanium Feather". They included Sara Sabry, who became the first Egyptian person and first Arab woman in space, and Mário Ferreira, who became the first Portuguese person in space. Also onboard was Coby Cotton, one of the co-founders of American YouTube channel Dude Perfect. Cotton's flight was sponsored by MoonDAO, a decentralized autonomous organization.

The passengers also included American British explorer Vanessa O'Brien, who became the first woman to complete the Explorers' Extreme Trifecta, which involves travelling to the bottom of the Challenger Deep, the summit of Mount Everest, and flying into outer space.

| Position | Passenger |
|---|---|
| Tourist | (Egypt) (Lebanon) Sara Sabry; First spaceflight |
| Tourist | (Portugal) Mário Ferreira; First spaceflight |
| Tourist | (United States) Clint Kelly III; First spaceflight |
| Tourist | (United States) Coby Cotton; First spaceflight |
| Tourist | (United States) Steve Young; First spaceflight |
| Tourist | (United States) (United Kingdom) Vanessa O'Brien; First spaceflight |
