= Mona K. Marei =

Egyptian researcher

- Born: Mona K. Marei; Egypt
- Education: Alexandria University (BDS, MScD); Henry M. Goldman School of Dental Medicine, Boston University (PhD)
- Known for: Research in prosthodontics, biomaterials, and regenerative medicine
- Scientific career
- Fields: Dentistry, Biomaterials, Tissue Engineering, Regenerative Medicine
- Workplaces: Alexandria University; African Renaissance Institute of Science and Technology

Mona K. Marei is an Egyptian researcher.

== Early life and education ==
Mona was born in Egypt. She studied at a public University in Egypt known as Alexandria University and graduated with a Bachelor of Dental Surgery (BDS). She also pursued a Master of Science in Conservative Dentistry (MScD) and a Doctor of Philosophy (PhD) in Prosthodontics from Henry M. Goldman School of Dental Medicine, Boston, Mass, USA 1981.

== Career ==
Mona has served in the fields of Dentistry, Tissue Engineering Science, Technology and education. She has supervised a number of Master's students (MS) and Doctor of Philosophy (PhD) theses in the field of Dentistry, Biomaterial, Biomedical Engineering and Regenerative Medicine.

She is also in leadership positions, for example, she is a board member of the National Council – governmental presidential office in Egypt for genetic engineering/education-science and technology. She was also the President of the African – Material Research Society in 2011. She was appointed a board member of permanent scientific higher committee for promotion in Dentistry Ministry of higher education Egypt in 2008.

She is also a recognized woman in science and technology in Egypt. She is an International African Advisor board member in African Renaissance Institute of Science and Technology since 2005 (to the present).

== Publications ==
Mona has published research articles. These include:

Viscoelasticity, mechanical properties, and in vivo biocompatibility of injectable polyvinyl alcohol/bioactive glass composite hydrogels as potential bone tissue scaffolds.

Efficacy of Bioactive Glass Nanofibers Tested for Oral Mucosal Regeneration in Rabbits with Induced Diabetes.

== See also ==
- Alexandria University
- African Academy of Sciences
- Marie Imogene Williams
- Robert Lee
- Caroline Louise Josephine Wells
