= Fawzia Fahim =

Egyptian academic (born 1931)

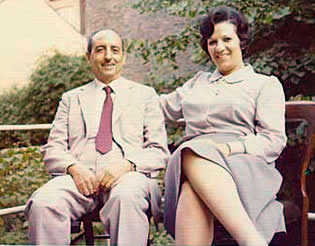
- Fawzia Fahim with her husband Salah, London, 1976
- Born: 9 December 1931 (age 94); Al-Fayoum, Egypt
- Education: Cairo University; Ain Shams University; Birmingham University
- Known for: Egyptian health issues. Anti-tumor effects of venoms and iodoacetate
- Scientific career
- Fields: Biochemistry and Environmental Biology
- Workplaces: Ain Shams University
- Doctoral students: Faten Zahran

Fawzia Abbas Fahim (born 9 December 1931) is an Egyptian biochemist and environmental biologist known for her work on the anti-tumoral effects of snake venom and iodoacetate. She is currently Professor of Biochemistry at Ain Shams University, Egypt. Fahim has also made important contributions to infant and occupational health, and pollution issues in Egypt.

Fahim worked as a Demonstrator in the Faculty of Engineering, Department of Chemistry at Cairo University, from 1957 to 1962. She received a governmental grant from the United Kingdom, October 1962 – June, 1965, where she attended Birmingham University. In 1966 she served as a lecturer in the Department of Biochemistry at Ain Shams University. In 1975 Fahim became an associate professor and in 1980 she became a full professor, the position she still holds.

Fahim was head of the Department of Biology and Natural Sciences, Institute of Environmental Studies and Research, at Ain Shams University from 1983 to 1989.

Fahim received her B.Sc. from Cairo University, Egypt, in 1954 and her Master of Science in chemistry from Cairo University in 1962. In 1965 she got her Ph.D. from Birmingham University, England. She is the author, or co-author, of over 80 scientific papers.

== Personal life ==
In 1959 Fahim married Salah El-Din Mohamed El-Mahdi, a professor of Design and Theory of Machines at the Faculty of Engineering, Ain-Shams University. He died in 1998. They had 3 children.

== Selected publications ==
- Fahim, Fawzia A; Esmat, AMR Y; Mady, Essam A; Ibrahim, Emad K (2003). "Antitumor Activities of Iodoacetate and Dimethylsulphoxide Against Solid Ehrlich Carcinoma Growth in Mice". Biological Research. 36 (2): 253–62. doi:10.4067/S0716-97602003000200015. PMID 14513720.
- Fahim, FA; Esmat, AY; Mady, EA; Ahmed, SM; Zaki, MA (2002). "Biological activities of the crude skin toxin of the Suez Gulf oriental catfish (Plotosus lineatus) and its antitumor effect in vivo (mice)". Journal of Natural Toxins. 11 (4): 283–95. PMID 12503871.
- Fahim, Fawzia A.; Fleita, Daisy H.; Ibrahim, Abdallah M.; El-Dars, Farida M. S. (2001). "Evaluation of some Methods for Fish Canning Wastewater Treatment". Water, Air, & Soil Pollution. 127: 205–26. Bibcode:2001WASP..127..205F. doi:10.1023/A:1005292204184. S2CID 91315423.
- Fahim, Fawzia A.; Esmat, Amr Y.; Hassan, Gehan K.; Abdel-Bary, Abeer (2000). "Biochemical changes in patients with combined chronic schistosomiasis and viral hepatitis C infections". Disease Markers. 16 (3–4): 111–8. doi:10.1155/2000/732754. PMC 3851732. PMID 11381190.
- Fahim, Fawzia A.; Esmat, Amr Y.; Fadel, Hoda M.; Hassan, Khaled F. S. (1999). "Allied studies on the effect of Rosmarinus officinalis L. On experimental hepatotoxicity and mutagenesis". International Journal of Food Sciences and Nutrition. 50 (6): 413–27. doi:10.1080/096374899100987. PMID 10719582.
- Fahim, Fawzia A.; Morcos, Nadia Y.S.; Muhammad, Faten Z.; Esmat, Amr Y. (1989). "Role of dietary magnesium and/or manganese variables on ehrlich ascites tumor-bearing mice". Nutrition and Cancer. 12 (3): 279–86. doi:10.1080/01635588909514027. PMID 2771804.
- Mady, E. A. (2002). "Antitumor and biochemical effects of Echis coloratus crude venom on Ehrlich ascites carcinoma cells in vivo". Journal of Venomous Animals and Toxins. 8 (2): 283–96. doi:10.1590/S0104-79302002000200008.
