= Al-Kum al-Rishi =

Medieval Egyptian astronomer (1381 – 1432)

- Born: Ahmad bin Ghulamallah bin Ahmad bin Mahammad, Shihab al-Din al-Kum al-Rishi al-Qahiri (أحمد بن غلام الله بن أحمد بن محمد، شهاب الدين الكومي الريشي); 1381; Kum al-Rish, Cairo, Egyptian Mamluk Sultanate, now Egypt
- Died: 1432 (aged 50–51); Cairo, Egyptian Mamluk Sultanate, now Egypt
- Occupation: Astronomer
- Era: Mamluk era (Islamic Golden Age)
- Notable work: Nuzhat al-Nazir fi tashih zij Ibn al-Shatir; Al-Lum’ah fī ḥall al-kawākib al-sabʻah; Kifayat al-Ta'leem fi wad'e al

Ahmad bin Ghulamallah bin Ahmad bin Mahammad, Shihab al-Din al-Kum al-Rishi al-Qahiri (Arabic: أحمد بن غلام الله بن أحمد بن محمد، شهاب الدين الكومي الريشي القاهري) (1381 – 1432) was an Egyptian astronomer from Kum al-Rish region in Cairo. So, his nickname among astronomers became Al-Kum al-Rishi (الكوم الريشي). He is considered one of the greatest astronomers of his time, he worked in the art of the stars and began solving zij and writing calendars. He was appointed as a timekeeper at Al-Muayyad Mosque in Cairo.

== Works ==
He wrote very important books on astronomy, where he described the planets and stars accurately and explained their surfaces with great progress for his time.

- Kifayat al-Ta'leem fi wad'e al-Taqaweem: Al-Thanawi quoted it in Kashshaf Istilāhāt al-Funūn.
- Nuzhat al-Nazir fi tashih zij Ibn al-Shater: It is a summary and correction of the zij of Ibn al-Shatir (d. 777 AH/1375 AD).
- Al-Lum’ah fī ḥall al-kawākib al-sabʻah: A summary of his book “Nuzhat al-Nazir”. His book included mathematical tables, such as a table for extracting Hebrew history from Arabic and vice versa. The literary style is evident in it. He says in the introduction to Al-Lum’ah: “As for what follows, when I saw that the desire to seek knowledge had diminished in its shadow, its inclination was far from the rate of seeking, it had fallen short of grasping the pinnacle of knowledge in its horses and feet, and its flow had descended to the bottom of understandings; They turned away from the lengthy ones, and tended to the abbreviations. I wrote my book called “Nuzhat al-Nazir” in Summarizing the zij of Ibn al-Shater, then I summarized it in a wonderful way and in an invincible way, containing the deeds in it in the easiest way to take it and the closest goal, and I called it “Al-Lum’ah fī ḥall al-kawākib al-sabʻah.”

== Timekeeper at Al-Muayyad mosque ==
His job as a “timekeeper” at Al-Muayyad Mosque gives him the advantage of combining “authorship and practice,” between “knowledge and work.” Unfortunately, this job has been cut off from mosques in the Islamic world. Thus, only the “Muezzin” was left, and in most cases he was not an astronomer or calendar scholar. Rather, the call to prayer was transformed into a daily job and the performance of a sufficient duty. But it lost the scientific mission assigned to it, which is to mobilize the Muslim's enthusiasm for universal intellectual scientific research and reach a state of creativity and leadership.

== Legacy ==
Ibn Hajar al-Asqalani (d. 852 AH/1449 AD), a contemporary of him and from the same country, who may have met him, said about him: “He dabbled in the art of the stars and knew many rulings. He began to solve zij and write calendars, and he was one of the famous people in that.”
