= Faten Zahran Mohammed =

Egyptian biochemist

Faten Zahran Mohammed فاتن زهران محمد
- Born: October 11, 1955 (age 70); Cairo, Egypt
- Education: Ain Shams University; Zagazig University
- Known for: Egyptian health issues. Anti-tumor effects of venoms and iodoacetate
- Scientific career
- Fields: Biochemistry and Environmental Biology
- Workplaces: Zagazig University
- Doctoral advisor: Fawzia Fahim

Faten Zahran Mohammed (Arabic: فاتن زهران محمد; born October 11, 1955, in Cairo) is an Egyptian biochemist and environmental biologist, cancer biologist and toxicologist known for her work on the anti-tumoral effects of snake venom and iodoacetate. She is currently Professor of Biochemistry at Zagazig University, Egypt, head of the Biochemistry Division, Faculty of Science, and a member of Egyptian Universities Promotion Committees "EUPC".

== Biography ==
She worked as a Demonstrator of Biochemistry in Chemistry Department, Faculty of Science, Zagazig University, Egypt from 1977 to 1981. She served as Assistant Lecturer of Biochemistry, in the Faculty of Science, Zagazig University, Egypt from 1981 to 1985. Lecturer of Biochemistry, Chemistry Department, Faculty of Science, Zagazig University, Egypt from 1985 to 1991. She was assistant professor of biochemistry, Chemistry Department, Faculty of Science, Zagazig University, Egypt from 1991 to 1996. Professor of Biochemistry, Chemistry Department, Faculty of Science, Zagazig University, Egypt from 1996 until present (2008). She received her B.Sc. in 1977, her M.Sc. in biochemistry in 1981, and her Ph.D. in biochemistry in 1985 from Faculty of Science, Ain Shams University. She received her M.Sc. and Ph.D. under the supervision of Dr. Fawzia Abbas Fahim.

== Selected publications ==
- Fahim FA., Zahran F., Mady EA. "Effect of N. nigricollis venom and its fraction on EAC in mice." In: INTERNATIONAL CONFERENCE OF THE EGYPTIAN SOCIETY OF TUMOR MARKERS ONCOLOGY, 1, Cairo, 1988. Abstracts...Cairo: Ain Shams University- Faculty of Medicine, 1988. 375–94.
- Mohamed AH, Fouad S, El-Aasar S, Salem AM, Abdel-Aal A, Hassan AA, Zahran F, Abbas N. "Effects of several snake venoms on serum and tissue transaminases, alkaline phosphatase and lactate dehydrogenase." Toxicon. 1981;19(5):605-9
