= Nazli Gad-El-Mawla =

Egyptian oncologist (1929–2001)

Nazli Mohamed Gad-El-Mawla
- Born: 1929
- Died: 2001 (aged 71–72)
- Citizenship: Egypt
- Education: Cairo University
- Occupation: oncologist

Nazli Mohamed Gad-El-Mawla (1929 – 2001) was an Egyptian oncologist.

Educated at the University of Cairo, Nazli Gad-El-Mawla founded the Department of Medical Oncology at National Cancer Institute Egypt. She was Professor of Oncology there from 1977 to 1989. She was known particularly for her work in the chemotherapy of bilharzial bladder cancer, accounting for around a quarter of all cancer in Egypt, and in hematological malignancies.

The International Network for Cancer Treatment Research has established an award in her memory, the Nazli Gad-el-Mawla Award, for outstanding contributions to cancer control by individuals from countries with limited resources.
