= Sara Sabry =

Egyptian engineer and citizen astronaut

- سارة صبري
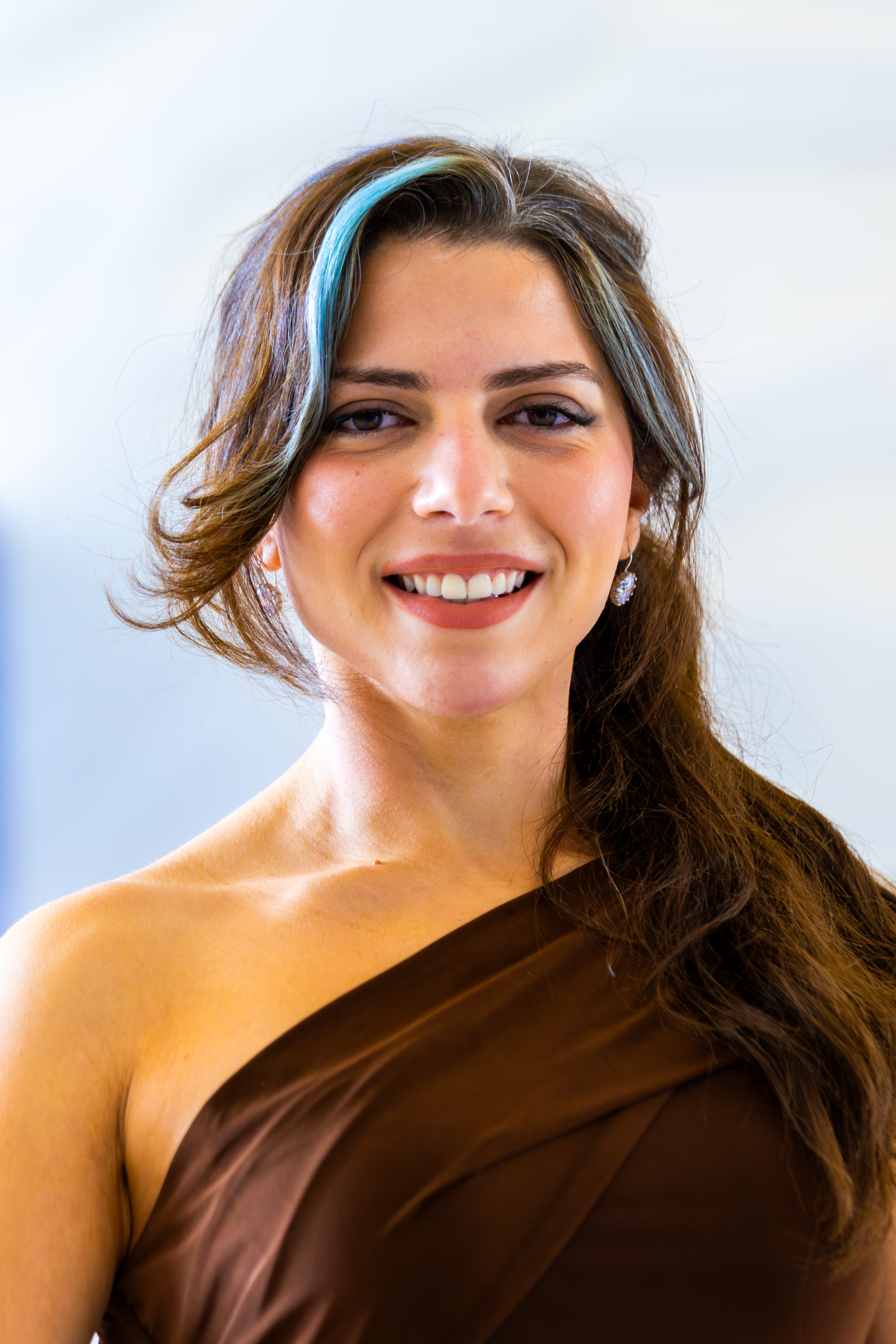
- Sabry at Dubai Future Forum 2024
- Born: May 23, 1993 (age 33); Egypt
- Citizenship: Egyptian
- Education: American University in Cairo (BS); Polytechnic University of Milan (MS); University of North Dakota
- Occupations: Engineer; astronaut; entrepreneur
- Known for: First Egyptian, and first Arab or African woman, (Note: Women of African descent have previously traveled to space. Mae Jemison became the first African-American woman to enter space with the 1992 Space Shuttle STS-47 mission.) to travel to space. CEO of the Deep Space Initiative.
- Space career

Spaceflight participant
- Flight time: 10m 20s
- Selection: Space For Humanity: Citizen Astronaut Program (2022)
- Missions: Blue Origin NS-22
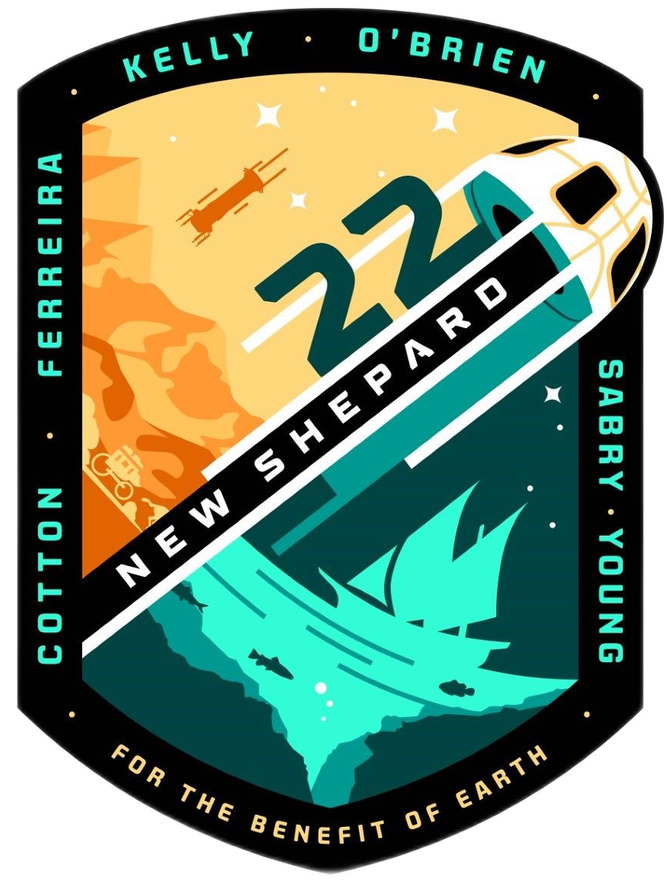
- Mission insignia

Sara Sabry (born May 23, 1993) is an Egyptian engineer, citizen astronaut, and entrepreneur. In 2022, as part of the Blue Origin NS-22 mission, she became the first Egyptian to travel into space, as well as the first African and Arab woman. She is also the founder and CEO of the Deep Space Initiative, a non-profit organization.

In 2021, she completed a two-week Moon mission simulation, and has also completed an astronaut training program at Florida Tech, making her the first Egyptian woman qualified to conduct research in sub-orbital space.

Sabry is an international keynote speaker, sharing her experiences in entrepreneurship, space travel, technology, and overcoming personal obstacles. She researches planetary spacesuits with the NASA-funded Human Spaceflight Lab at the University of North Dakota.

== Education and career ==
Sabry graduated from Lycee Francais du Caire. She earned her bachelor's degree in mechanical engineering from the American University in Cairo in 2016, minoring in biology, chemistry and pre-med. She then went on to obtain a master's degree in biomedical engineering from the Polytechnic University of Milan in 2020 where her research focused on the use of AI in Robot-assisted surgery.

Sabry is working toward a doctoral degree in Aerospace Sciences from the University of North Dakota in the United States, while conducting research on Spacesuit Engineering at their NASA-funded Human spaceflight Lab.

== Pre-flight research ==
In 2021, Sabry participated in an Analog Moon mission simulation in LunAres Research Station as the crew Medical Officer, making her the first Female Egyptian Analog Astronaut.

Sabry founded Deep Space Initiative, a non-profit organization aimed at expanding accessibility to space. The organization offers various programs and initiatives to encourage individuals, especially those from underrepresented groups, to enter the space field with hands-on experience. Their Education Department offers course certifications related to Astronaut Health & Performance, Space Architecture, and Space Transportation Systems.

== Spaceflight ==
In 2022 Sabry was selected from seven thousand international applicants to participate in the Space for Humanity Citizen Astronaut Program, becoming the first Egyptian, Arab woman, and African woman to go into space. On August 4, 2022 she flew on Blue Origin NS-22 flight, a sub-orbital flight that reached an altitude of 107 km (66 miles) above sea level, lasting 10 minutes and 20 seconds. The NS-22 mission marked the twelfth "piloted commercial, non-government sub-orbital spaceflight," and was the sixth crewed Blue Origin flight.

== Awards ==
Sabry has received the IAF Emerging Space Leader Award. In 2023 she was also nominated as a Karman Project Fellow. In 2025, she was selected as an Explorers Club 50 (EC50) awardee.

== See also ==
- Women in space
- List of women astronauts
- List of space travelers by nationality
