= Amany Fekry =

Egyptian chemist

- Occupation: Chemist
- Spouse: Khalid Essa
- Children: 3
- Awards: Fellow of the African Academy of Sciences (2020)

Academic work
- Discipline: Chemistry
- Sub-discipline: Nanoscience; electrochemistry
- Institutions: Cairo University

Amany Mohamed Fekry is an Egyptian physical chemist.

She became a professor of physical chemistry at the Cairo University Department of Chemistry. She also spent some time abroad at University of Lorraine, where she was part of the electroanalytical group for a Science and Technology Development Fund grant in collaboration with France, and also was a postdoctoral fellow at the GeoRessources laboratory.

She specializes in nanoscience and electrochemistry, and she has authored several articles on the latter in Electrochimica Acta and New Journal of Chemistry. By 2022, she had authored at least a hundred scholarly articles, as well as an h-index of 33.

She won several awards in basic sciences, specifically a 2010 Cairo University Encouraging Award, a 2012 Country Encouraging Award, and 2020 Cairo University Scientific Excellence Award. In 2018, she became a qualitative council member of the Academy of Scientific Research and Technology. In 2020, she was elected a Fellow of the African Academy of Sciences in Chemical Sciences. She was one of the recipients of the 2021 Obada Prize.

Her husband, Khalid Essa, is a geophysicist who also works as a professor at the University of Cairo, and they have three daughters.
