= Fyodor Yurchikhin =

Russian cosmonaut and engineer (born 1959)

- Фёдор Юрчихин
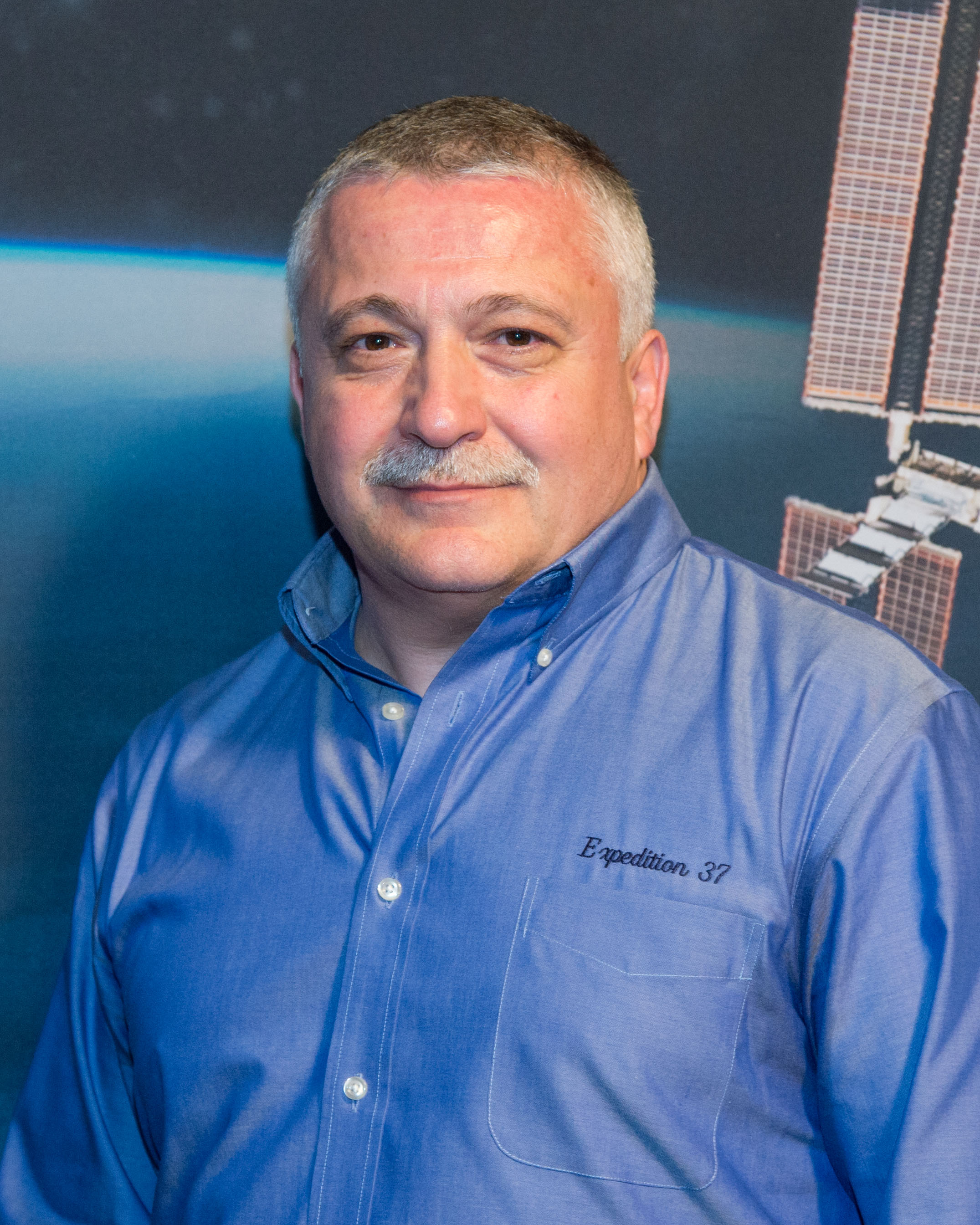
- Born: 3 January 1959 (age 67); Batumi, Adjarian ASSR, Georgian SSR, Soviet Union
- Occupation: Cosmonaut
- Awards: Hero of the Russian Federation
- Space career

Roscosmos cosmonaut
- Current occupation: Mechanical engineer
- Status: Retired
- Time in space: 672 days 20 hours 38 minutes
- Selection: 1997 RKKE Cosmonaut Group
- Total EVAs: 9
- Total EVA time: 59 hours and 28 minutes
- Missions: STS-112, Soyuz TMA-10 (Expedition 15), Soyuz TMA-19 (Expedition 24/25), Soyuz TMA-09M (Expedition 36/37), Soyuz MS-04 (Expedition 51/52)
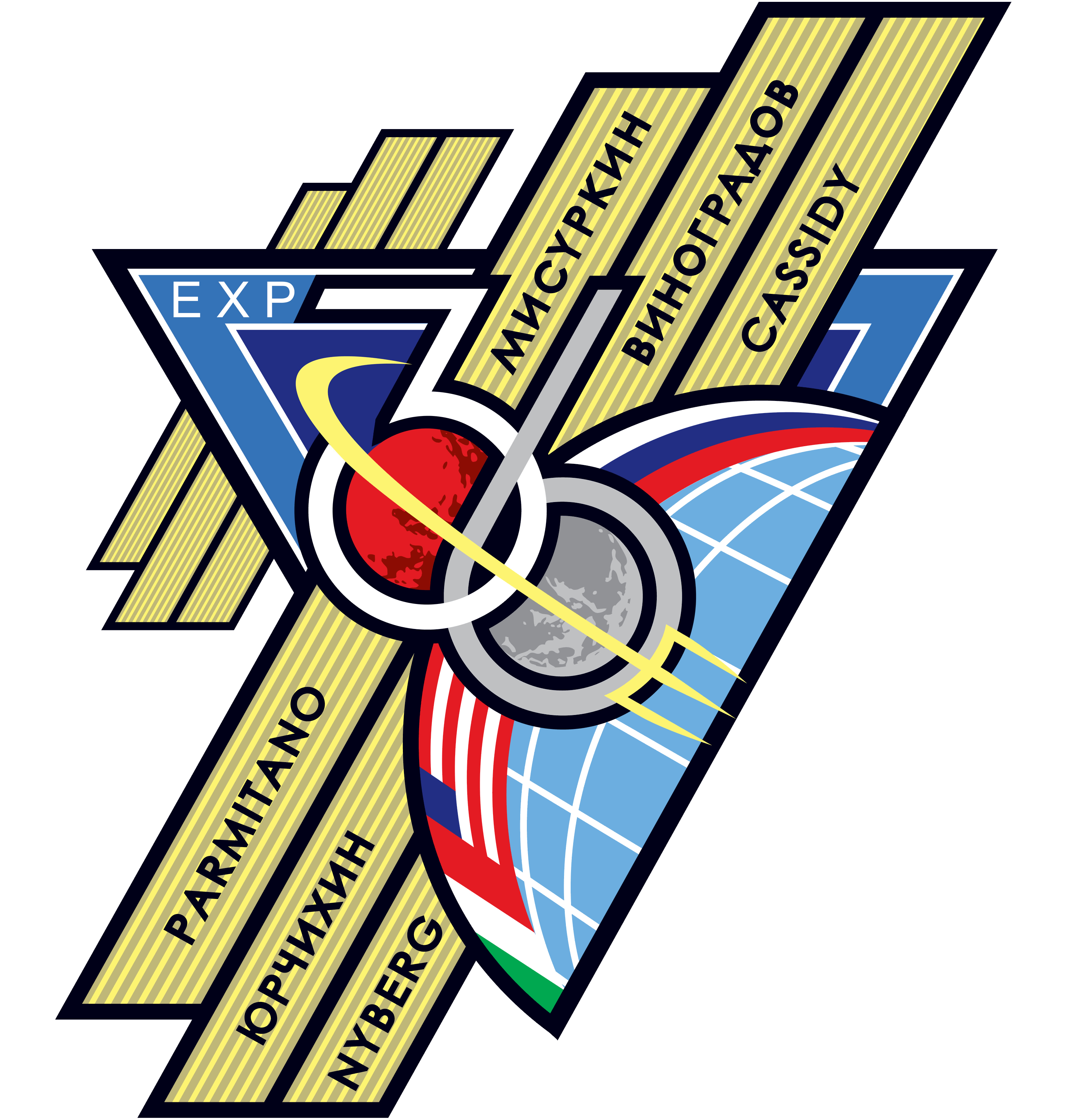
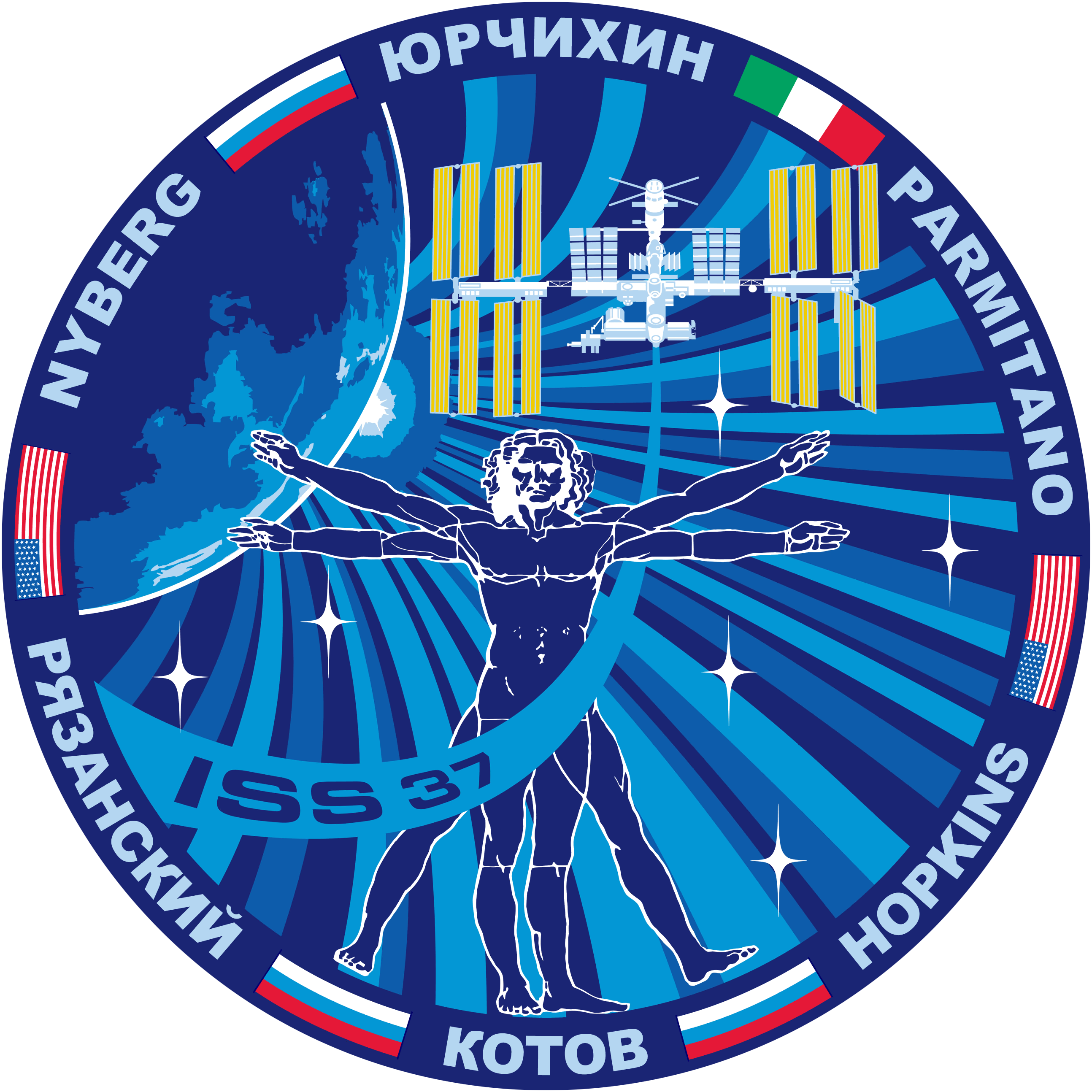
- Mission insignia
- Retired: December 13, 2019

Fyodor Nikolayevich Yurchikhin (Russian: Фёдор Николаевич Юрчихин, Greek: Θεόδωρος Γιουρτσίχιν του Νικόλαου; born 3 January 1959) is a former Russian cosmonaut of Pontic Greek descent, engineer and RSC Energia test-pilot who has flown on five spaceflights. His first spaceflight was a 10-day Space Shuttle mission STS-112. His second was a long-duration stay aboard the International Space Station (ISS) as a flight engineer for Expedition 15; for this mission he was launched in the Soyuz TMA-10 spacecraft. He has undertaken two further long-duration stays aboard the ISS, as a crew member of Expedition 24 / 25. For this mission he was launched with the spacecraft Soyuz TMA-19, and he landed in November 2010, also with the Soyuz TMA-19 spacecraft. He served as Soyuz commander for his fourth mission aboard Soyuz TMA-09M, as flight engineer for Expedition 36 and ISS commander for Expedition 37. In April 2017, Yurchikhin launched on Soyuz MS-04 for the fifth spaceflight of his career, a six-month mission to the ISS as part of Expedition 51 and 52, for which he was the commander.

== Early life and family ==
Yurchikhin was born in Batumi, Adjar ASSR, Georgian SSR (now Adjara autonomous republic of Georgia) on 3 January 1959 to Pontic Greek parents Nikolai Fyodorovich Yurchikhin and Mikrula Sofoklevna Yurchikhina (born Heleni Grammatikopoulou) (both now reside in Sindos, Greece). Yurchikhin is married to Larisa Anatolievna Yurchikhina (born in Shchyolkovo) and has two daughters. His hobbies include collecting stamps and space logos, sports, history of cosmonautics, and promotion of space. He also enjoys reading history, science fiction and the classics.

== Education ==
After graduation from high school in Batumi in 1976, he entered the Moscow Aviation Institute named after Sergey Ordzhonikidze. He finished studying in 1983, and is qualified as a mechanical engineer, specializing in airspace vehicles. In 2001, he graduated from the Russian Presidential Academy of National Economy and Public Administration (RANEPA) with a Ph.D. in economics.

== Awards ==
Yurchikhin was awarded:

- the Hero of the Russian Federation medal (2008)
- the Order of Friendship medal (2003)
- the Order of the Phoenix (Greece)
- the NASA Space Flight Medal (2003)
- Order "For Merit to the Fatherland", II (2018), III (2015) and IV (2011) degrees
- знаки отличия Роскосмоса - Ю. А. Гагарина, С. П. Королёва, К. Э. Циолковского, медаль НАСА "За космический полет" (2003)
- Honorary member of the Russian Academy of Cosmonautics named after K. E. Tsiolkovsky and the Russian Academy of Arts (2017)
- medals of the Federation of Cosmonautics and the title of Russian Federation Test-Cosmonaut (2003)

Yurchikhin was one of five cosmonauts selected to raise the Russian flag at the Sochi 2014 Winter Olympics opening ceremony.

== Experience ==
After graduating from the S. Ordzhonikidze Moscow Aviation Institute, Yurchikhin worked at the Russian Space Corporation Energia from September 1983 until August 1997. He began working as a controller in the Russian Mission Control Center, and held the positions of engineer, senior engineer, and lead engineer, eventually becoming a lead engineer for Shuttle-Mir and NASA-Mir programs.

== Roscosmos career ==
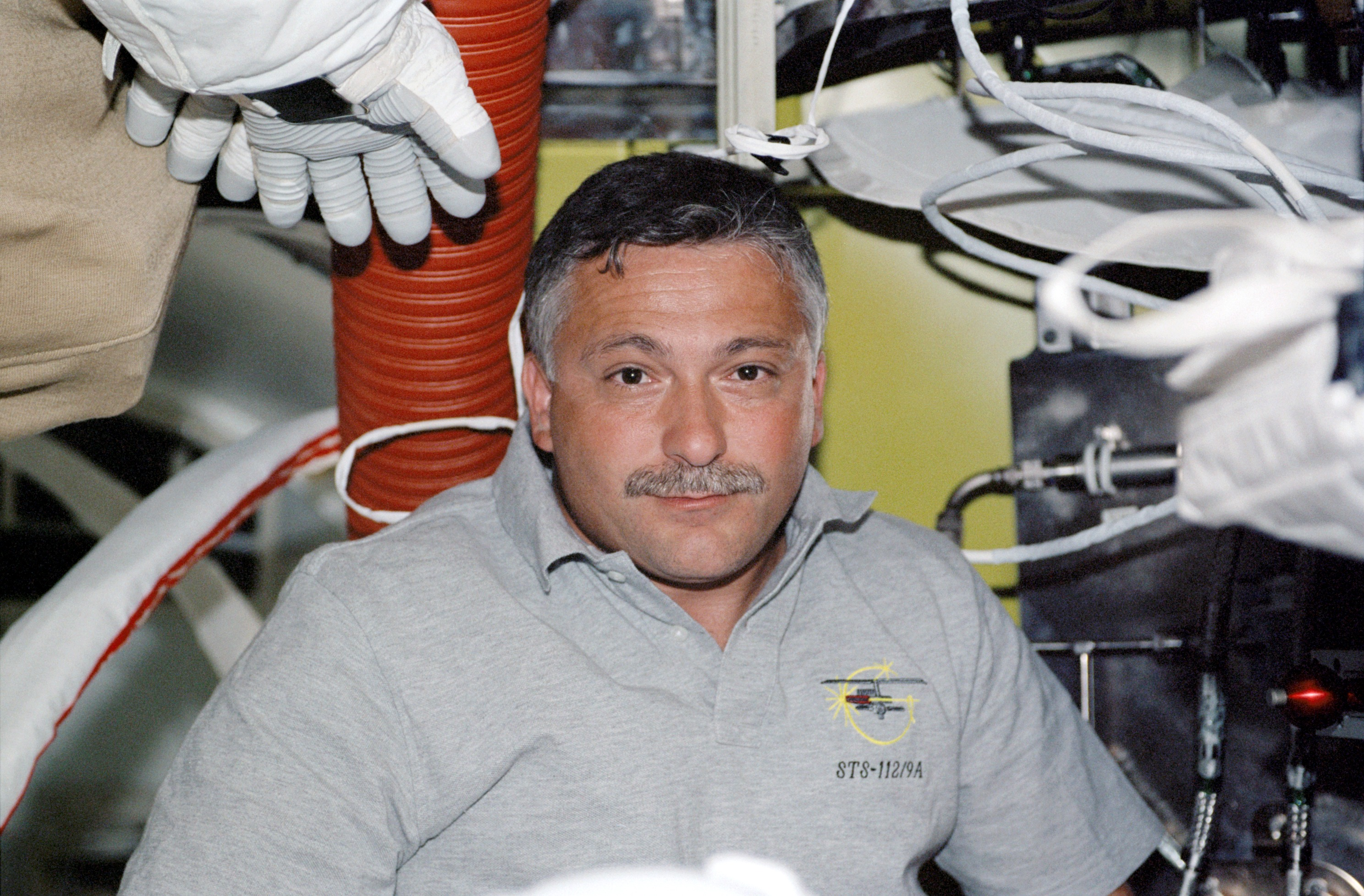
Fyodor Yurchikhin inside the Quest airlock during the STS-112 mission to the ISS.

In August 1997, he was enrolled in the RSC Energia cosmonaut detachment as a cosmonaut-candidate. From January 1998 to November 1999, he completed his basic training course. In November 1999, he was qualified as a test cosmonaut. In January 2000, he started training in the test-cosmonaut group for the International Space Station (ISS) program.

=== STS-112 ===
Yurchikhin was a crewmember of the International Space Station assembly mission STS-112 conducted using Space Shuttle Atlantis. During the mission the shuttle crew conducted joint operations with the Expedition 5 by delivering and installing the S1 Truss (the third piece of the station's 11-piece Integrated Truss Structure). Three spacewalks were required to outfit and activate the new component. The crew also transferred cargo between the two vehicles and used the shuttle's thruster jets during two maneuvers to raise the station's orbit. STS-112 was the first shuttle mission to use a camera on the External Tank, providing a live view of the launch to flight controllers and NASA TV viewers. The STS-112 mission was accomplished in 170 orbits, traveling 7,200,000 km (4,500,000 mi) in 10 days, 19 hours, and 58 minutes.

=== Expedition 15 ===
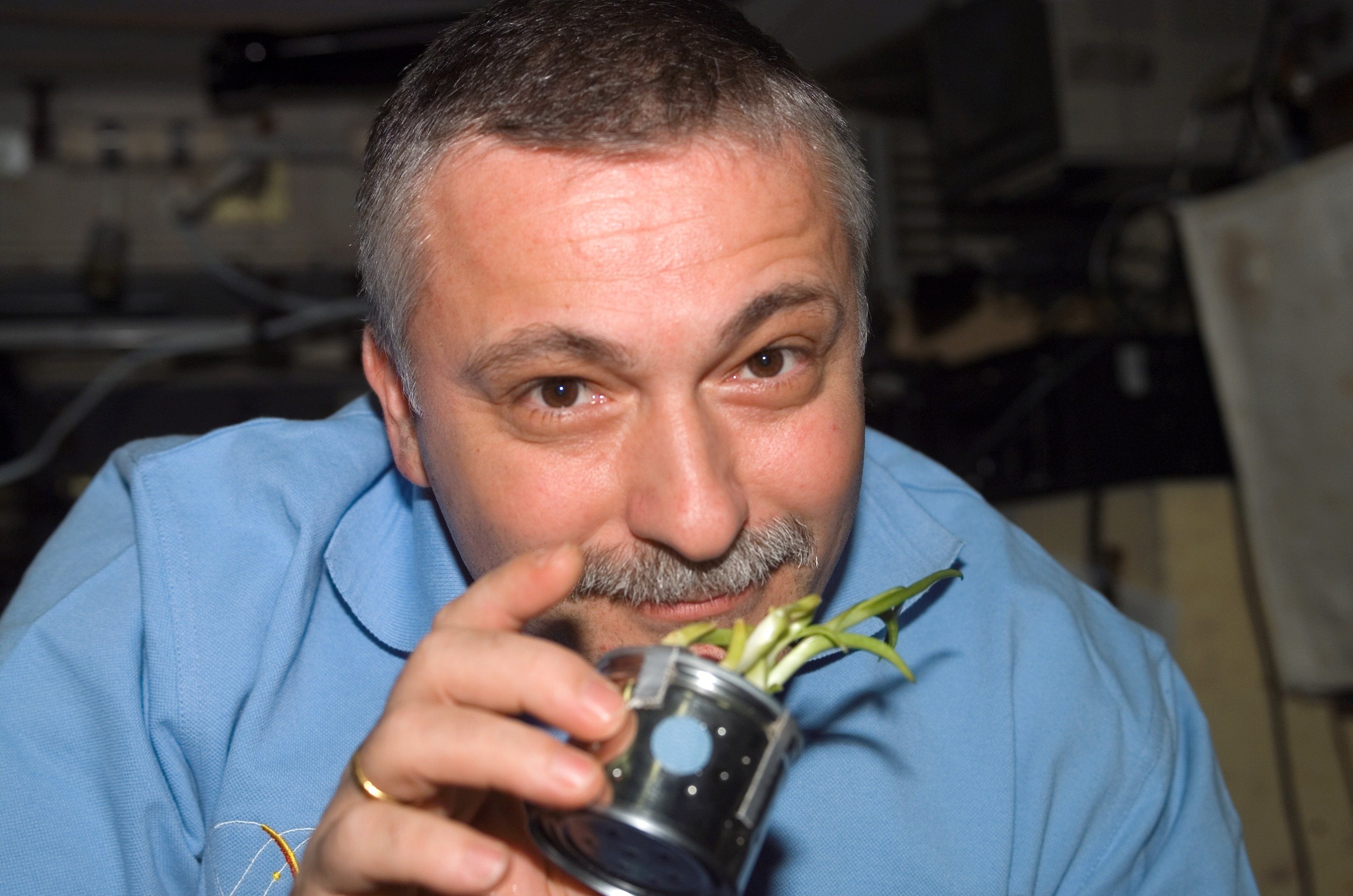
Fyodor Yurchikhin holds a garlic planter in the Zvezda module of the ISS.

In 2007, he became a member of the Expedition 15 on the ISS. His flight began on April 7, when he launched from the Baikonur Cosmodrome, aboard Soyuz TMA-10 spacecraft, together with Oleg Kotov and space tourist Charles Simonyi. Yurchikhin was aboard when Simonyi gave a live telebridge conversation on 17 April 2007. He served as the commander of the Expedition 15 mission.

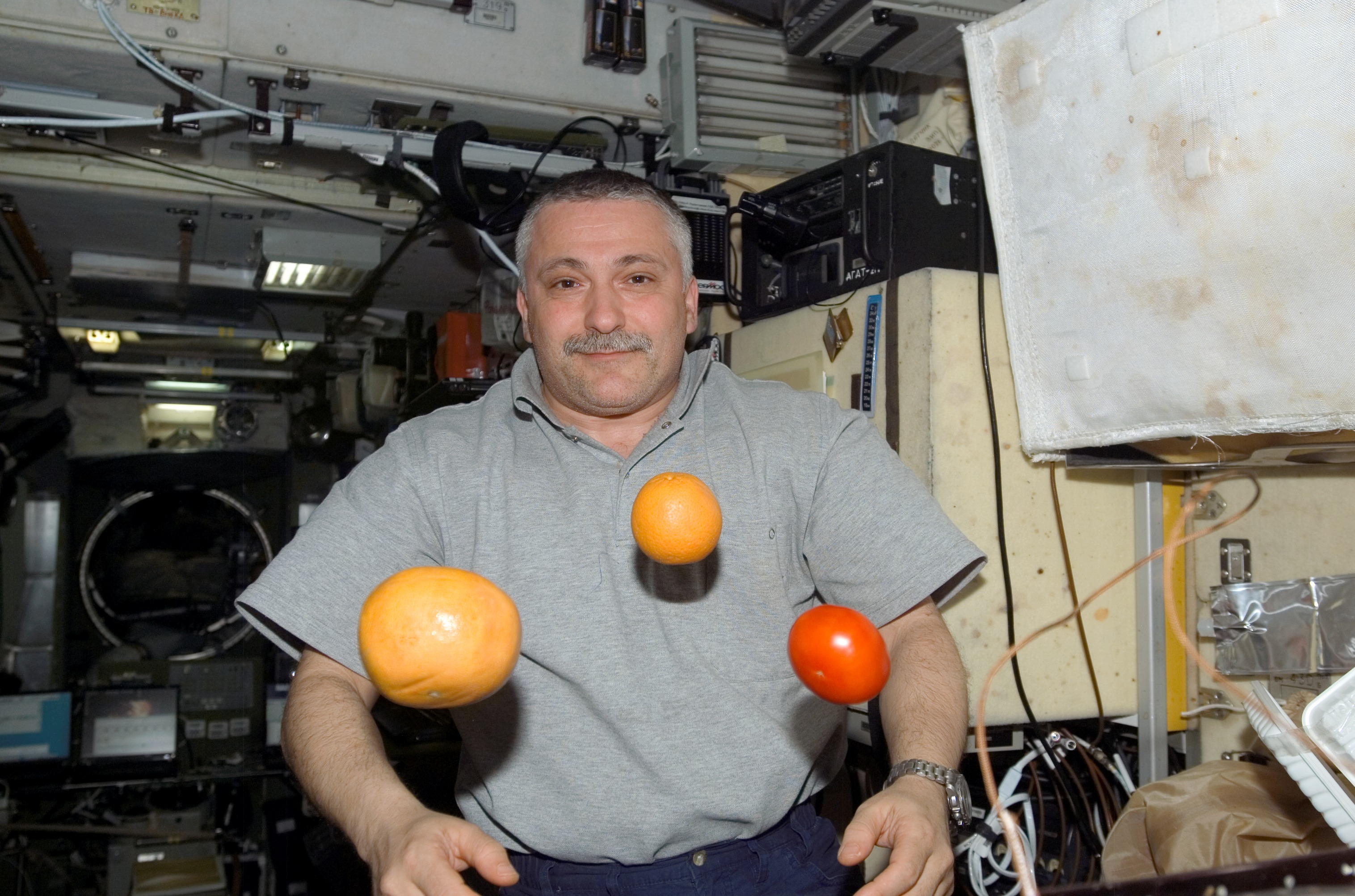
ISS Commander Yurchikhin pictured with fruit in Zvezda after a Progress resupply arrival.

On 21 October 2007, he returned to Earth inside the Soyuz TMA-10 capsule after spending 196 days and 17 hours in space. The Soyuz TMA-10 spacecraft undocked from the ISS at 07:14 UTC on 21 October 2007, and deorbit occurred at 09:47 UTC. During atmospheric re-entry, the spacecraft transitioned to a ballistic reentry, resulting in it landing west of Arkalyk, approximately 340 km (210 mi) northwest of the intended Kazakhstan landing site.

=== Expedition 24/25 ===
Yurchikhin served as a flight engineer for the Expedition 24/25 long-duration missions to the ISS. On 16 June 2010, Yurchikhin along with NASA astronauts Douglas Wheelock and Shannon Walker lifted off aboard the Soyuz TMA-19 spacecraft from the Baikonur Cosmodrome. He also served as the commander of the Soyuz TMA-19 spacecraft.

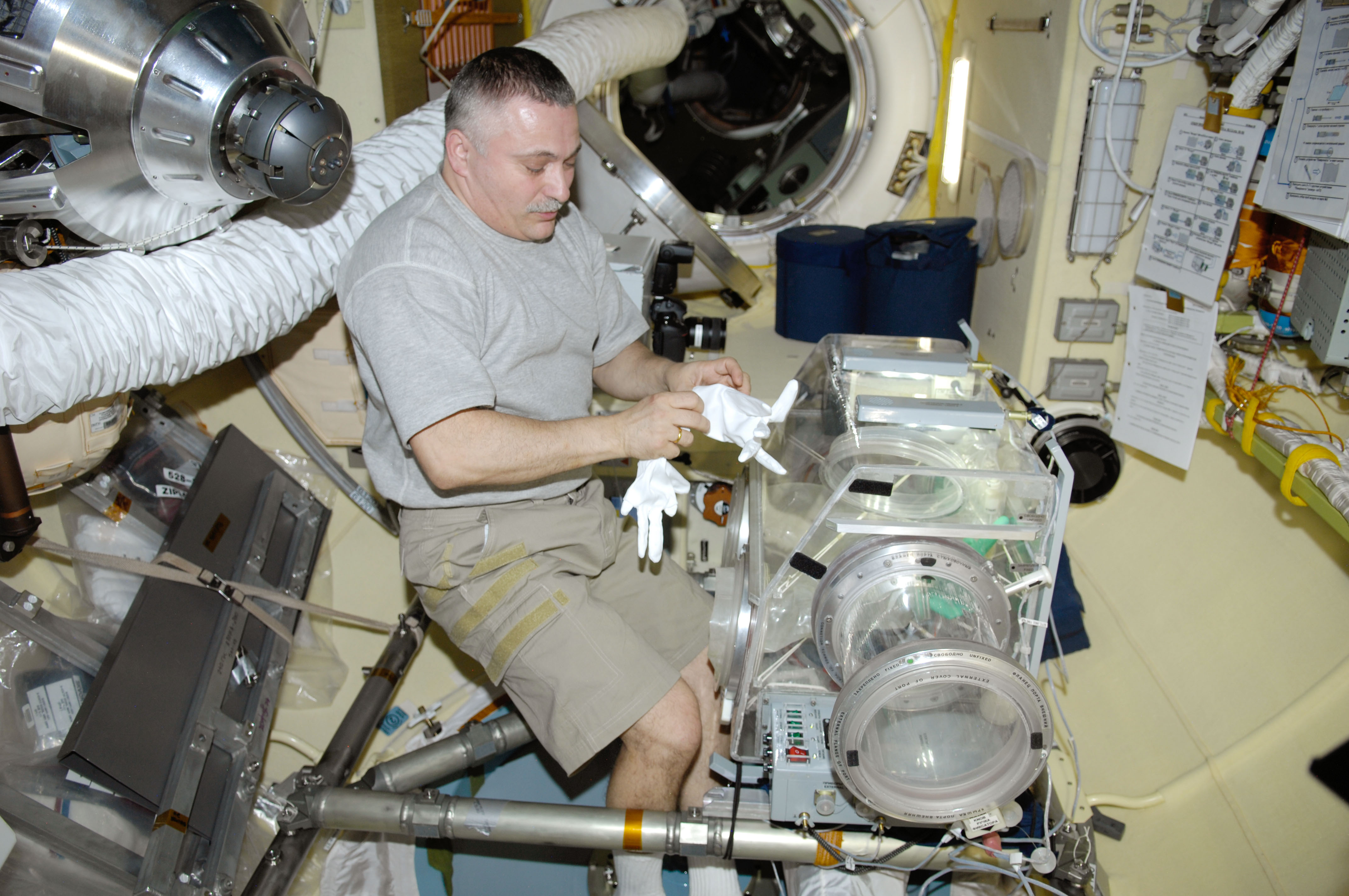
Yurchikhin, Expedition 24 crew member, working with the Russian bioscience glovebox.

During his second long stay aboard the ISS, Yurhikhin participated in two spacewalks in support of station's maintenance and staging new experiments in the exterior of the orbiting complex. On 26 July 2010, Yurchikhin and fellow Russian cosmonaut Mikhail Kornienko performed a spacewalk outside the space station. On 15 November 2010, Yurchikhin again participated in a spacewalk with cosmonaut and Expedition 25/26 flight engineer Oleg Skripochka.

On 18 October 2010, Yurchikhin took part in the all-Russian census from space. He answered questions for the census collectors during a linkup with the Mission Control Center outside Moscow.

Yurchikhin returned to Earth on 26 November 2010 after spending 163 days aboard the ISS. Soyuz TMA-19 carrying the trio of Yurchikhin, Wheelock and Walker undocked from the space station at 01:23:13 UTC After a nominal descent, the Soyuz TMA-19 descent module landed on the central steppes of Kazakhstan at 04:46 UTC After the successful landing, Yurchikhin headed for Star City – the home of the Yuri Gagarin Cosmonaut Training Center in Russia.

=== Expedition 36/37 ===
Yurchikhin served as Soyuz commander aboard Soyuz TMA-09M which launched to the ISS on 28 May 2013, docking some six hours later, with fellow crewmembers NASA astronaut Karen Nyberg and ESA astronaut Luca Parmitano. He served as flight engineer for Expedition 36, and as ISS commander for Expedition 37. For a short time Yurchikhin was commander to a crew of nine, after the docking of Soyuz TMA-11M on 7 November 2013, with four astronaut corps represented between the nine crewmembers (Roscosmos, NASA, ESA, JAXA).

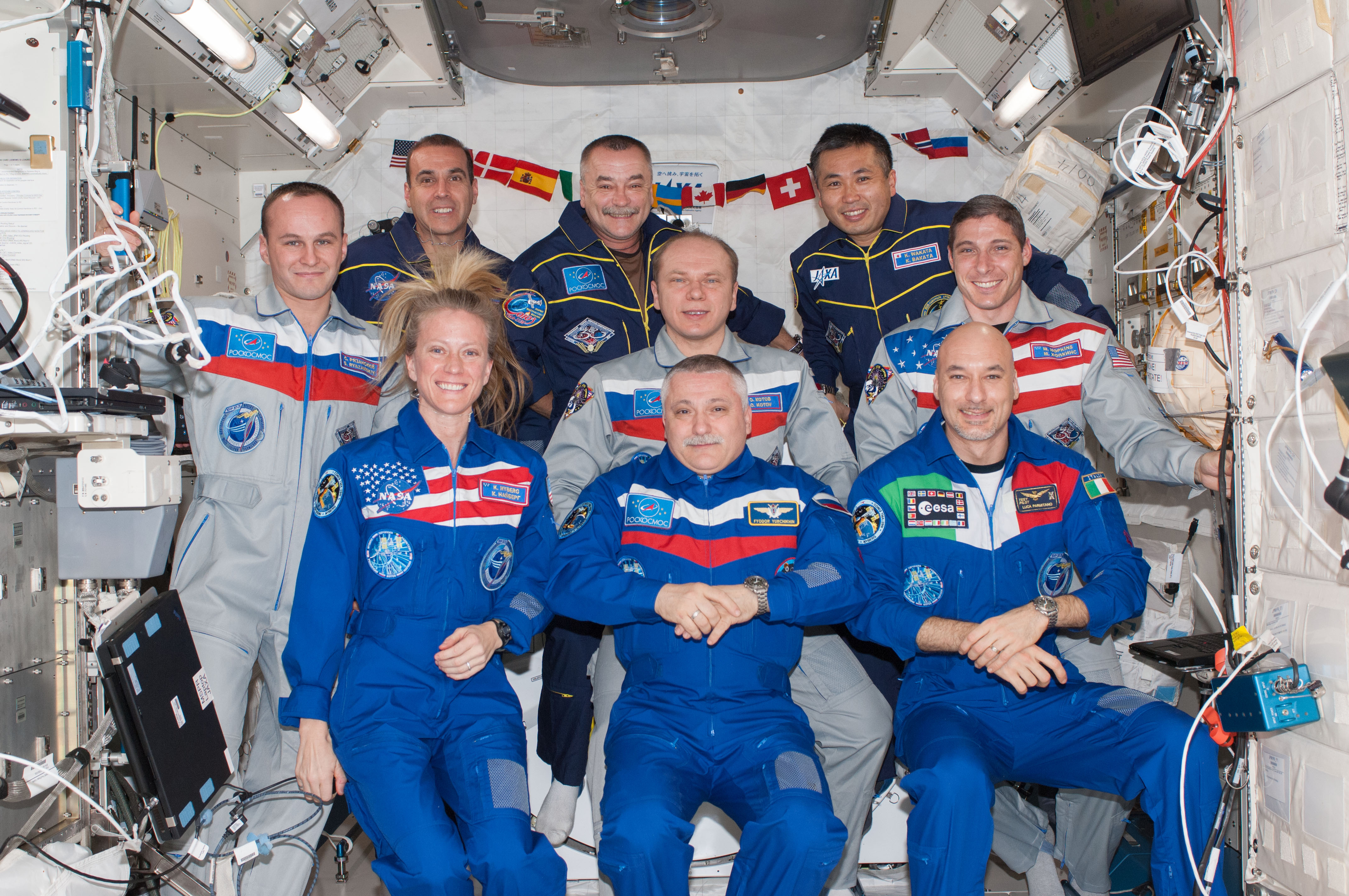
Yurchikhin (bottom row, centre), pictured with the Expedition 37 and 38 crew.

The three returned to Earth aboard their Soyuz on 11 November 2013.

=== Expedition 51/52 ===
Yurchikhin launched aboard Soyuz MS-04 for his fifth spaceflight to the ISS on 20 April 2017, with his crew member Jack D. Fischer. Soyuz MS-04 was the first of the Soyuz-MS series to rendezvous and dock with the ISS using the 6 hours profile, as opposed to the previous 2 days rendezvous procedure. He served as a flight engineer for Expedition 51, and on 1 June 2017, assumed command of the ISS over from crewmember Peggy Whitson.

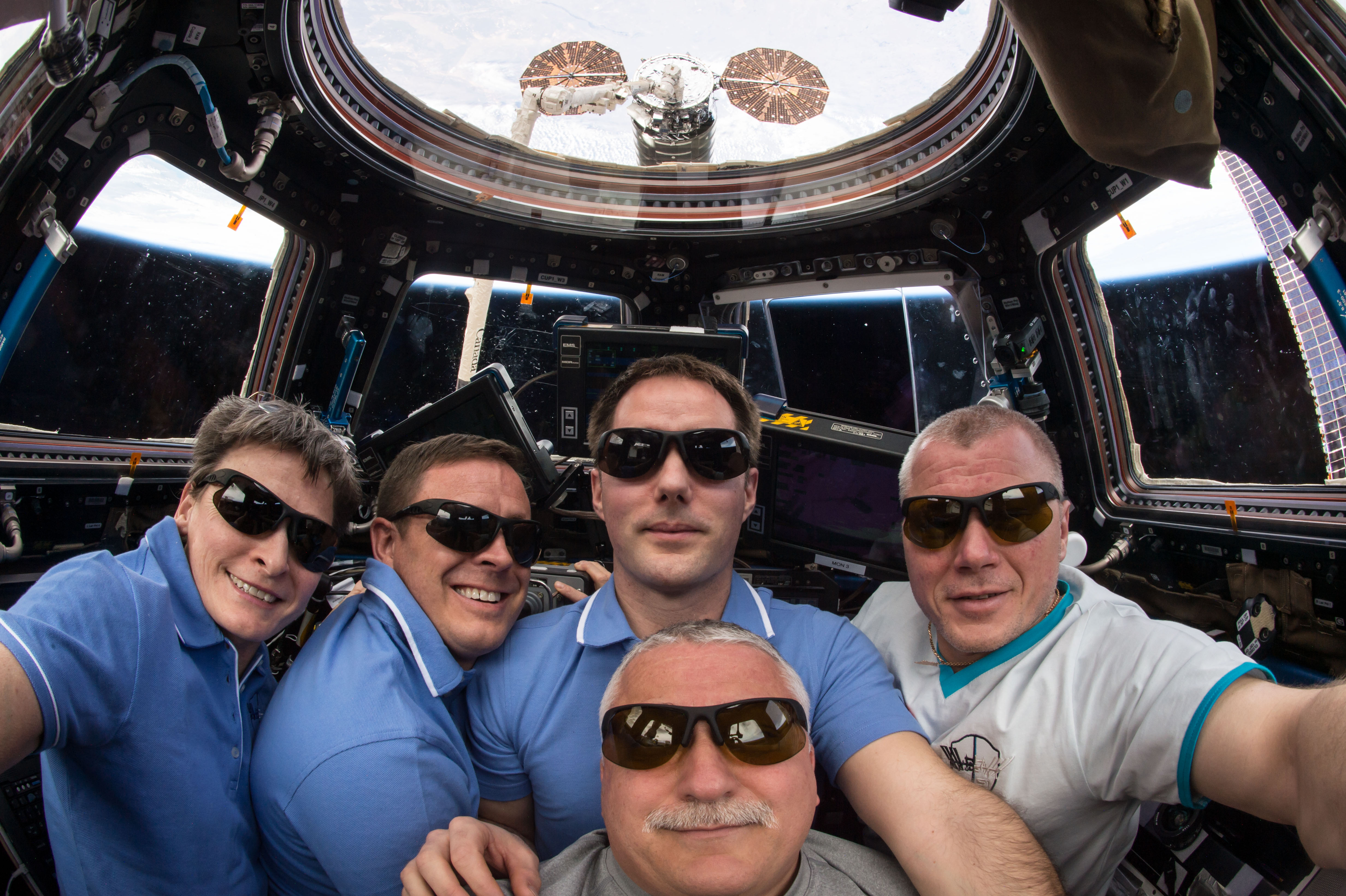
Yurchikhin (bottom centre) pictured with the rest of the Expedition 51 crew in the Cupola.

Yurchikhin handed over the station command to Randy Bresnik on 2 September 2017, and returned to Earth along with Peggy Whitson and Jack D. Fischer aboard Soyuz MS-04 on 3 September 2017. The overall duration of his stay in space during Expedition 51/52 was 135 days, 18 hours and 8 minutes.

After Expedition 51/52, Yurchikhin cumulative duration in space is 672 days 20 hours and 38 minutes.

=== Spacewalk summary ===
#	Date	Partner	Duration
1	30 May 2007	(Russia) Oleg Kotov	Five hours, 25 minutes
2	6 June 2007	(Russia) Oleg Kotov	Five hours, 37 minutes
3	23 July 2007	(United States) Clayton Anderson	Seven hours, 41 minutes
4	26 July 2010	(Russia) Mikhail Korniyenko	Six hours, 42 minutes
5	15 November 2010	(Russia) Oleg Skripochka	Six hours, 27 minutes
6	24 June 2013	(Russia) Alexander Misurkin	Six hours, 34 minutes
7	16 August 2013	(Russia) Alexander Misurkin	Seven hours, 29 minutes
8	22 August 2013	(Russia) Alexander Misurkin	Five hours, 58 minutes
9	17 August 2017	(Russia) Sergey Ryazansky	Seven hours, 34 minutes
Total spacewalk time			59 hours, 28 minutes

On 30 May 2007, at 19:05 UTC, Yurchikhin began his first spacewalk from the Pirs docking compartment airlock. He and fellow cosmonaut Oleg Kotov performed a five-hour and 25 minute spacewalk, during which they installed protective panels to shield ISS from space debris.

Fyodor Yurchikhin participates in a spacewalk on 6 June 2007.

On 6 June 2007, Yurchikhin performed his second spacewalk from the Pirs docking compartment airlock. The two spacewalkers installed a section of Ethernet cable on the Zarya module, installed additional Service Module Debris Protection (SMDP) panels on Zvezda, and deployed a Russian scientific experiment. Yurchikhin and Kotov returned to the ISS at 20:00 UTC to wound up the five hours, 37 minutes spacewalk.

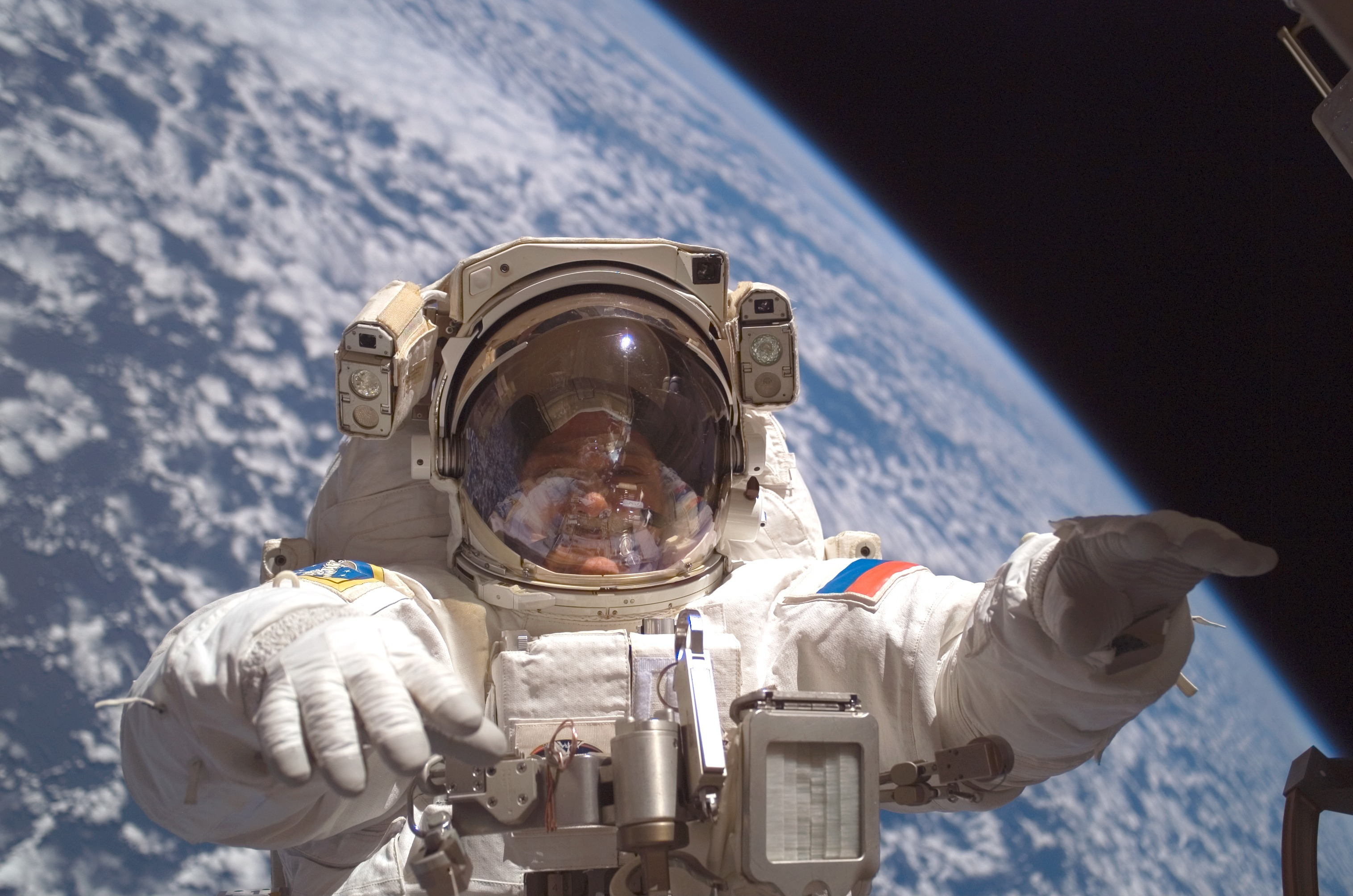
Fyodor Yuchikhin participates in his third spacewalk on 23 July 2007.

On 23 July 2007, Yurchikhin participated in his third spacewalk along with NASA astronaut Clayton Anderson. He emerged from the U.S. Quest airlock at 10:24 UTC, to officially begin the spacewalk. During the spacewalk, Yurchikhin and Anderson removed and jettisoned the Early Ammonia Servicer (EAS), installed a television camera stanchion, reconfigured a power supply for an antenna assembly, and performed several get-ahead tasks. The spacewalk lasted seven hours and 41 minutes.

On 26 July 2010, Yurchikhin and fellow Russian cosmonaut Mikhail Kornienko performed a spacewalk outside the space station. The two cosmonauts on 23 July 2010 put on their Orlan space suits and performed a dry run of the spacewalk activities. From inside the Pirs docking compartment they checked out the Orlan systems, practiced translation movements and tested their mobility. During the spacewalk (Russian EVA #25), Yurchikhin and Kornienko outfitted the Rassvet module's (MRM-1) Kurs automated rendezvous system, installed cables and remove and replaced a video camera. The spacewalk lasted six hours and 42 minutes.

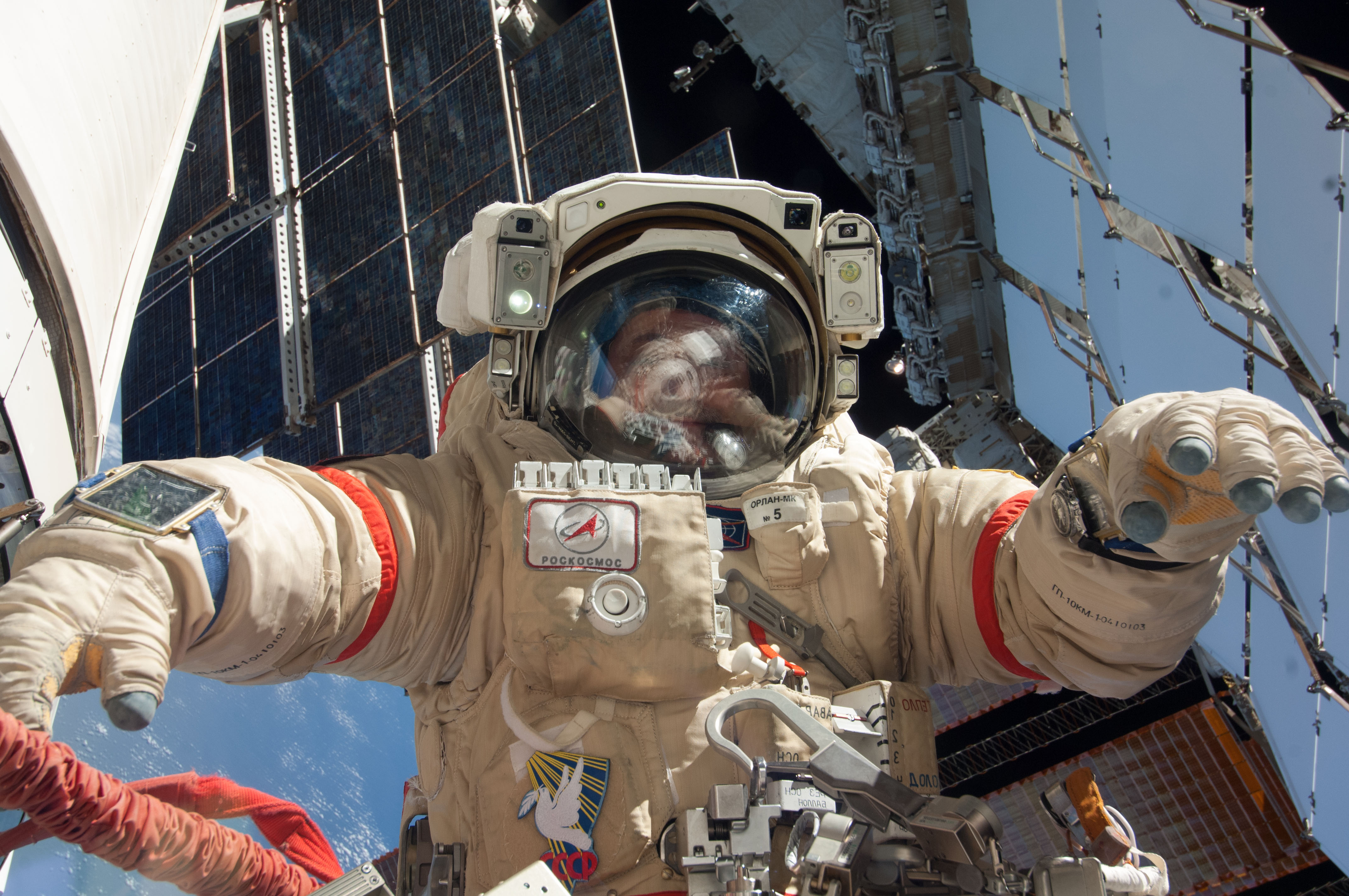
Fyodor Yurchikhin seen outside the ISS on 24 June 2013.

On 15 November 2010, Yurchikhin participated in a spacewalk with cosmonaut and Expedition 25 flight engineer Oleg Skripochka. At 13:25 UTC, he and Skripochka ventured into space outside the ISS from the Pirs airlock to conduct Russian EVA #26. The spacewalk lasted six hours and 27 minutes. It was the fifth for Yurchikhin, who was in the spacesuit marked with red stripes. The two cosmonauts removed Kontur and Expose-R scientific experiments. The Kontur experiment studied remote object control capability for robotic arms and the Expose-R experiment is a European Space Agency experiment designed to expose organic material to the extreme environment of space. During the spacewalk, Yurchikhin and Skripochka also installed a portable multipurpose workstation on the Zvezda service module and installed handrail extensions between the Poisk module and both Zvezda and Zarya modules. They performed an experiment called Test, which is aimed at verifying the existence of microorganisms or contamination underneath insulation on the Russian segment of the ISS. Yurchikhin and Skripochka removed a television camera from the Rassvet module, however they were not able to relocate the camera due to interference with insulation where it was to be installed.

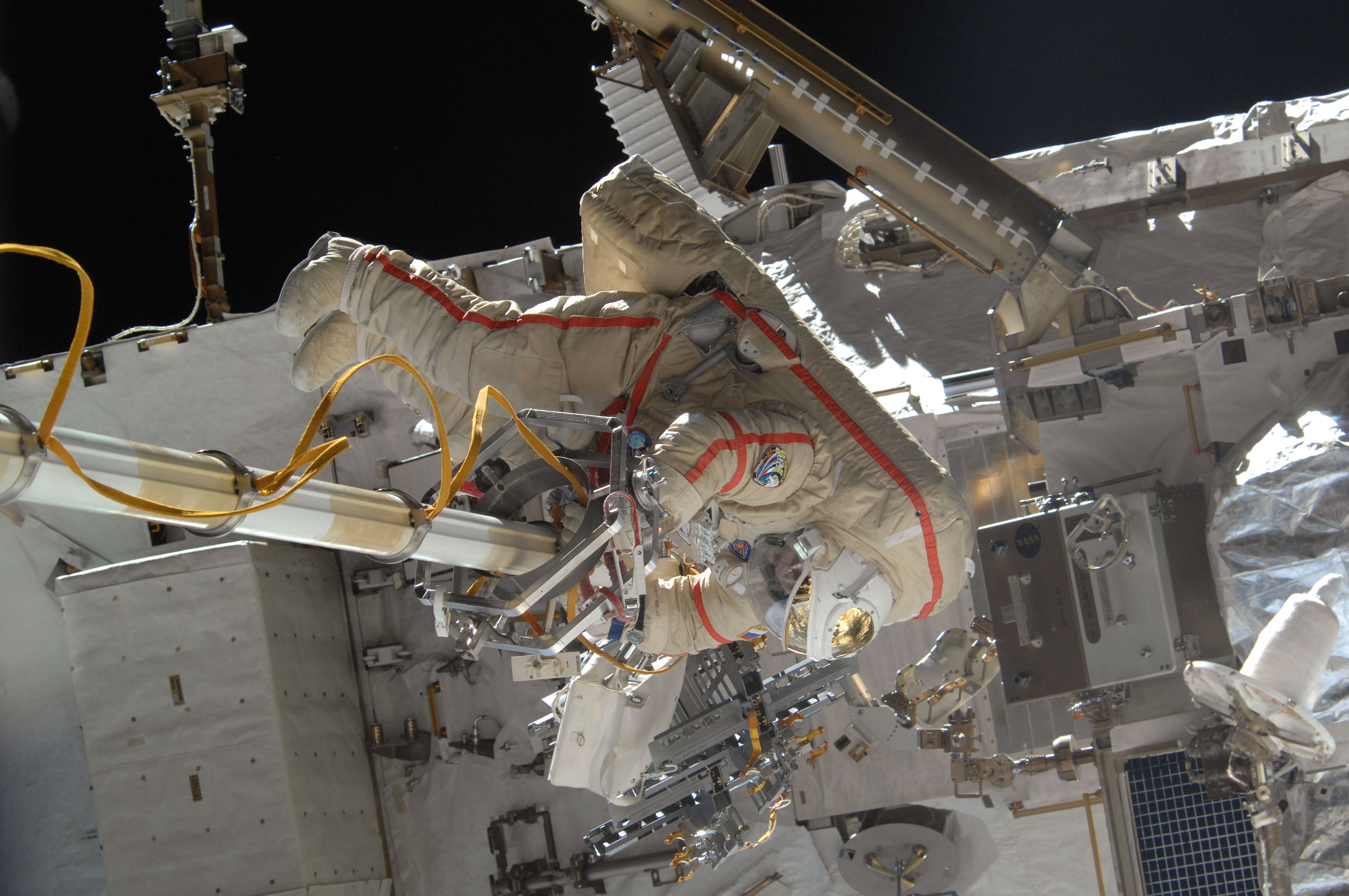
Fyodor Yurchikhin works outside the ISS during his seventh spacewalk.

On 24 June 2013, Yurchikhin performed a spacewalk with cosmonaut Alexander Misurkin. The two spacewalkers exited the Space Station's Pirs docking compartment with the primary goal of preparing for the addition of a new Russian module. The Orlan-MK space suits of Yurchikhin and Misurkin were equipped with NASA helmet cameras to provide close-up views of their work. During the spacewalk, Yurchikhin and Misurkin replaced a fluid flow control panel on the Zarya module. They also installed clamps for future power cables as an early step toward swapping the Pirs airlock with the new Nauka module planned to launch in 2021. The two cosmonauts also retrieved two science experiments and installed one new one. The spacewalk lasted six hours and 34 minutes.

On 16 August 2013, Yurchikhin performed his seventh spacewalk with cosmonaut Alexander Misurkin. They first set up a Strela cargo boom on the Poisk module. Misurkin used the Strela boom to maneuver Yurchikhin with cables and Yurchikhin rerouted a cable connector and installed cables on the Zarya module. The cable work outside the station was to prepare the ISS for the planned arrival of the Multipurpose Laboratory Module (MLM) – Nauka. The spacewalk ended at seven hours, 29 minutes when the cosmonauts closed the Pirs docking compartment hatch and re-entered the space station. The spacewalk set a new Russian spacewalk record, eclipsing the old mark of seven hours and 16 minutes set by two cosmonauts outside the Mir space station in July 1990. However, the record held by Yurchikhin and Misurkin was soon eclipsed by cosmonauts Oleg Kotov and Sergey Ryazansky when they performed an eight hours, seven minutes spacewalk on 27 December 2013.

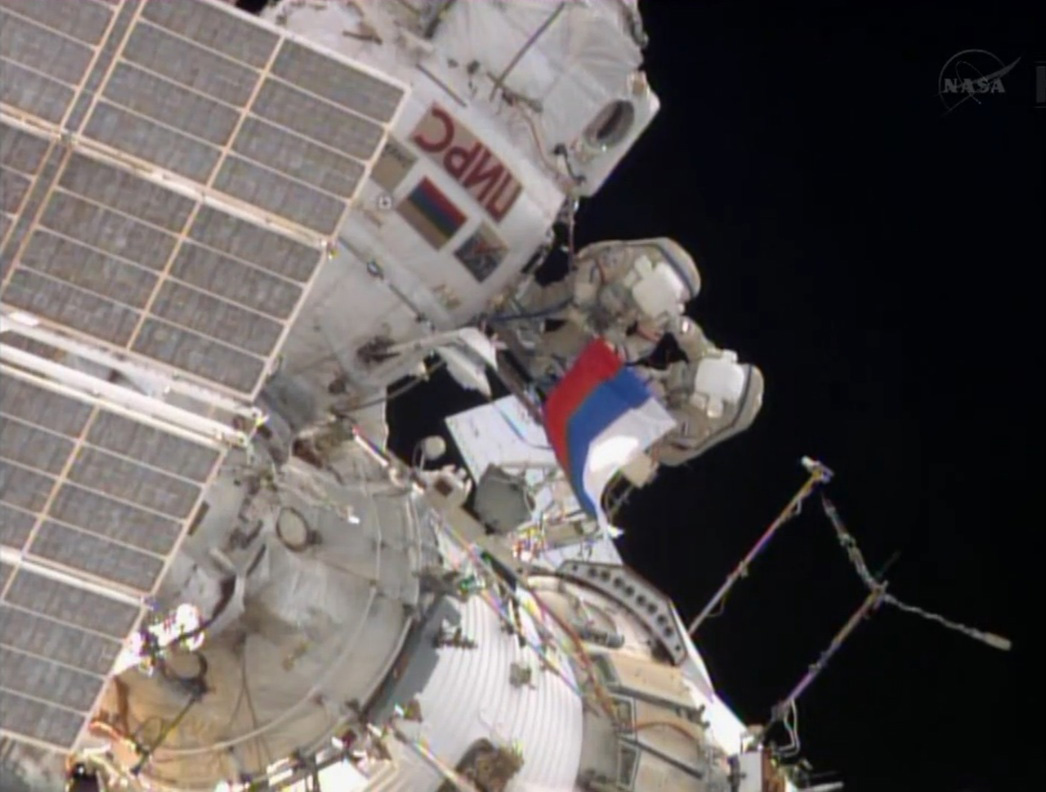
Fyodor Yurchikhin (left) waves a Russian flag at the end of the spacewalk on 22 August 2013.

On 22 August 2013, Yurchikhin performed his eight spacewalk with cosmonaut Alexander Misurkin. The cosmonauts exited the Pirs docking compartment and moved out to the first worksite on the Zvezda service module. Yurchikhin and Misurkin removed an External Onboard Laser Communications System, installed on the Zvezda module during an earlier spacewalk in August 2011. Next the spacewalkers successfully installed a camera platform on the starboard side of Zvezda module. Initially, Russian mission controllers advised Yurchikhin and Misurkin to stand down on the installation operations, due to a misaligned base plate issue in the camera platform. However, upon discovering that the problem could be fixed after its installation, the mission controllers gave the go ahead for the installation. Misurkin and Yurchikhin also headed to various sites on the Zvezda module to inspect the antenna covers and tighten screws on six antennas used for providing navigation data during ATV cargo ship rendezvous and docking operations. Yurchikhin also completed the installation of some devices called gap spanners used to help spacewalkers in their movements between the space station modules. The spacewalk lasted five hours and 58 minutes.

On 17 August 2017, Yurchikhin performed his ninth spacewalk with cosmonaut Sergey Ryazansky. The cosmonauts tested a new version of the Orlan space suit, deploying five nanosatellites and installing external experiments. Spacewalk lasted of 7 hours, 34 minutes.

Yurchikhin is currently seventh on the list of cumulative spacewalk records, with 59 hours, 28 minutes during his 9 spacewalks.

== See also ==
- List of Heroes of the Russian Federation

Preceded by Michael López-Alegría	ISS Commander (Expedition 15); 21 April to 21 October 2007	Succeeded by Peggy Whitson
Preceded by Pavel Vinogradov	ISS Commander (Expedition 37); 10 September to 11 November 2013	Succeeded by Oleg Kotov
Preceded by Peggy Whitson	ISS Commander (Expedition 52); 2 June to 2 September 2017	Succeeded by Randolph Bresnik
