= Expedition 15 =

2007 International Space Station expedition

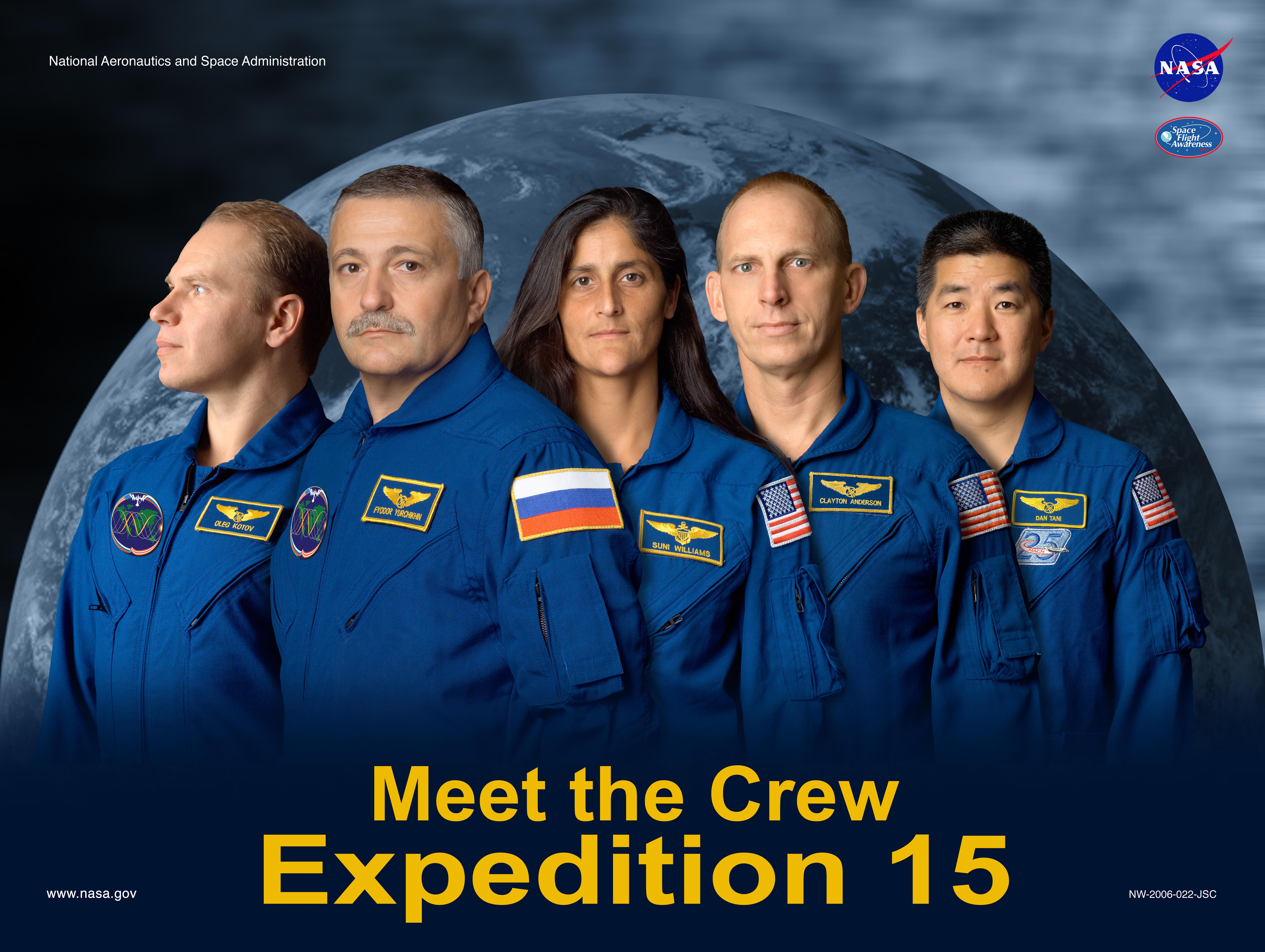
- Promotional Poster
- Mission type: Long-duration expedition
- Mission duration: 194 days, 12 hours and 4 minutes (at ISS) 196 days, 17 hours and 5 minutes (launch to landing) (Soyuz TMA-10)

Expedition
- Space station: International Space Station
- Began: 7 April 2007
- Ended: 21 October 2007
- Arrived aboard: Soyuz TMA-10; Williams: STS-116; Space Shuttle Discovery; Anderson: STS-117; Space Shuttle Atlantis
- Departed aboard: Soyuz TMA-10; Williams: STS-117; Space Shuttle Atlantis; Anderson: STS-120; Space Shuttle Discovery

Crew
- Crew size: 3
- Members: Fyodor Yurchikhin; Oleg Kotov; Sunita Williams* (to June); Clayton Anderson† (from June) * - transferred from Expedition 14 † - transferred to Expedition 16
- EVAs: 2
- EVA duration: 11 hours, 2 minutes
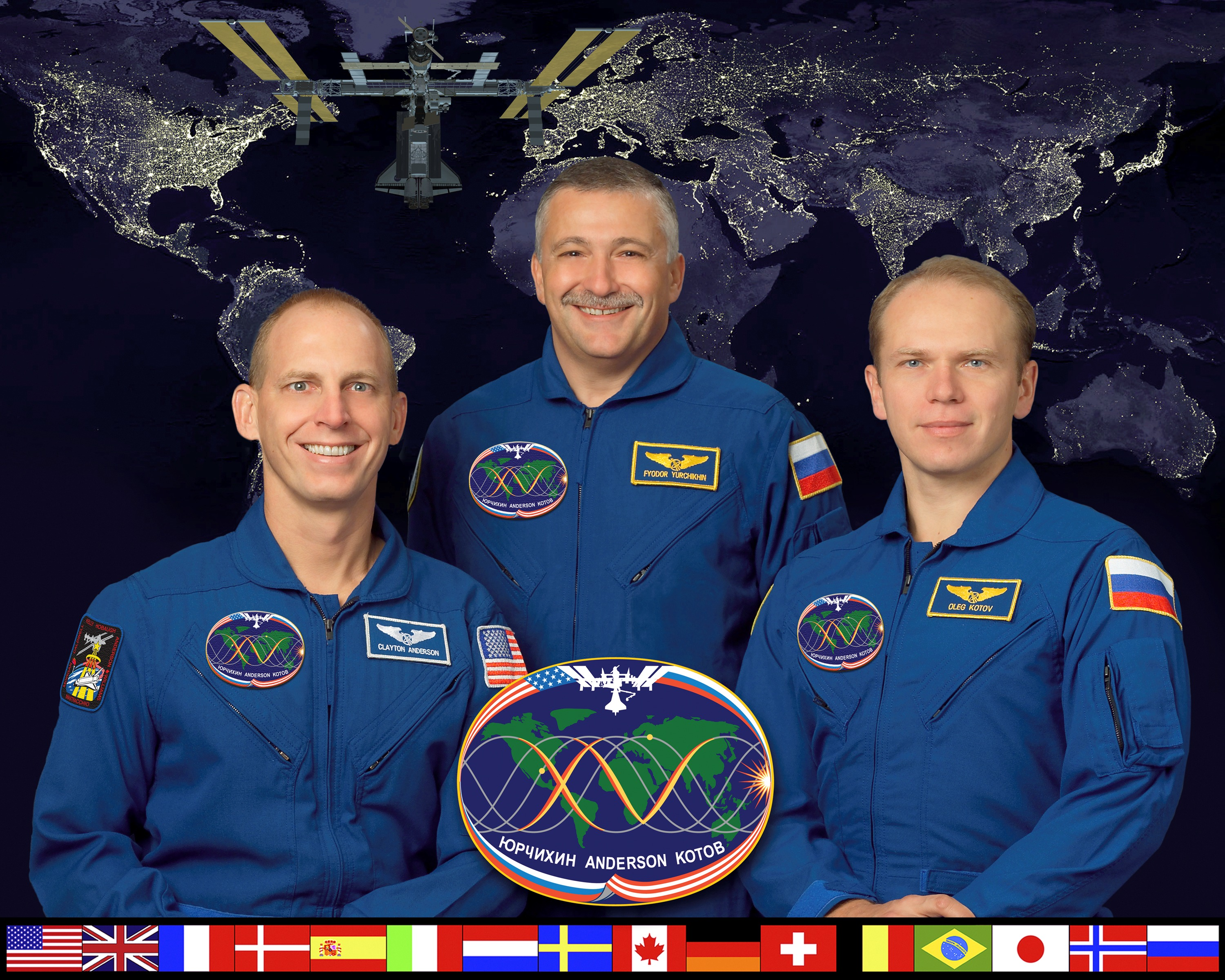
- Expedition 15 mission patch Second part crew from left to right: Clayton Anderson, Fyodor Yurchikhin, Oleg Kotov ISS expeditions

Expedition 15 was the 15th expedition to the International Space Station (ISS). Four crew members participated in the expedition, although for most of the expedition's duration only three were on the station at any one time. During Expedition 15, the ISS Integrated Truss Structure was expanded twice: STS-117 brought the S3/S4 truss, and STS-118 brought the S5 truss.

== Crew ==
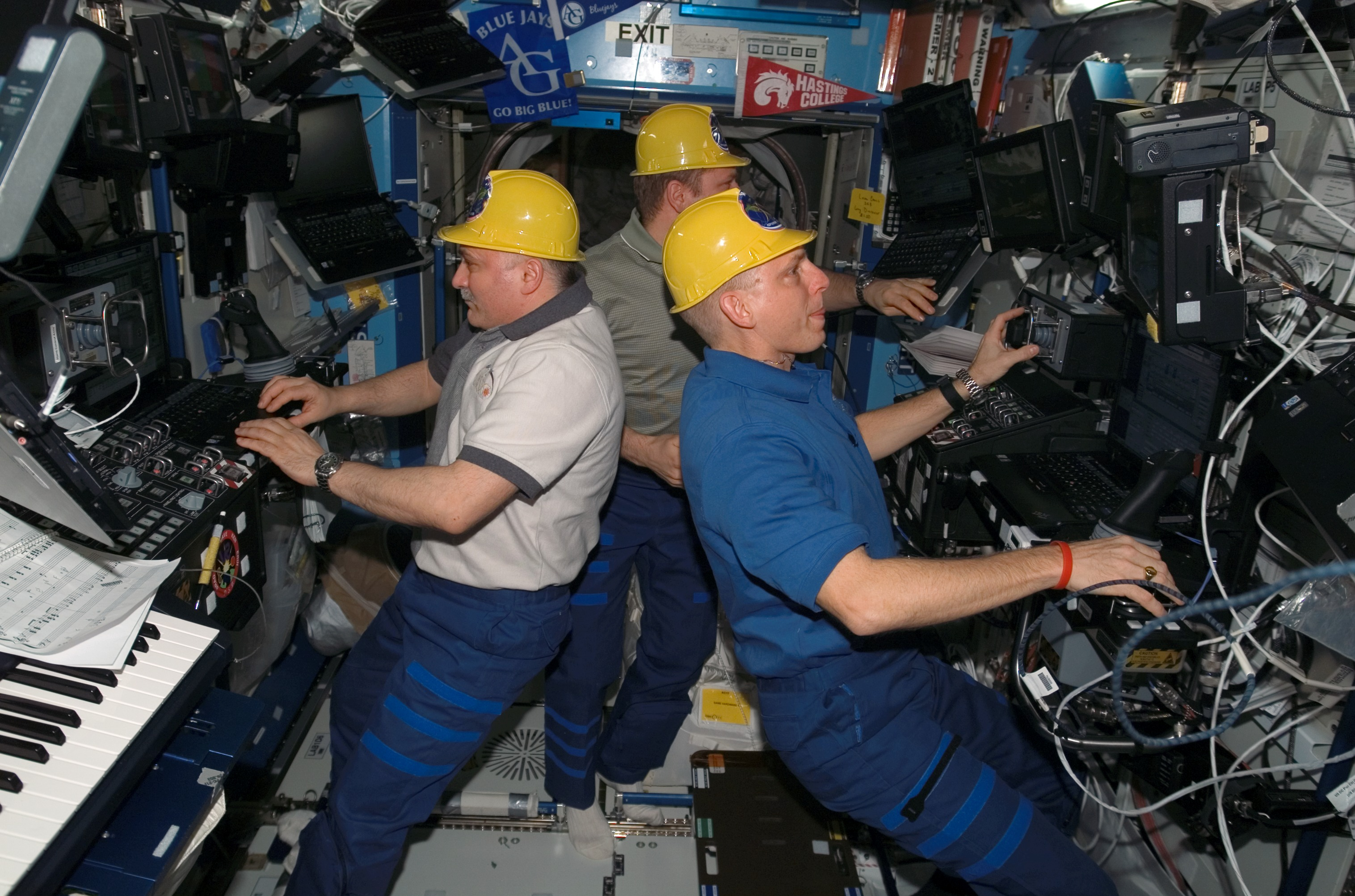
Cosmonauts Fyodor Yurchikhin (left) and Oleg Kotov, along with astronaut Clay Anderson (right) wearing yellow hard hats in a less serious moment.

Position	First Part (April to June 2007)	Second Part (June to October 2007)
Commander	Fyodor Yurchikhin, RSA; Second spaceflight	
Flight Engineer 1	Oleg Kotov, RSA; First spaceflight	
Flight Engineer 2	Sunita Williams, NASA; First Spaceflight	Clayton Anderson, NASA; First spaceflight

=== Crew Notes ===
Flight engineer Sunita Williams was the first Expedition 15 crew member to arrive. She participated in Expedition 14 until Expedition 15 commander Fyodor Yurchikhin assumed command of the station. Williams arrived at the station on 11 December 2006 aboard the Space Shuttle Discovery flight STS-116. Yurchikhin and flight engineer Oleg Kotov arrived the station on 9 April 2007 aboard Soyuz TMA-10.

On 26 April 2007, NASA announced that Williams would return to Earth on STS-117, flown by Space Shuttle Atlantis, instead of STS-118 as originally planned. Williams was replaced by Clayton Anderson, who arrived at the station aboard Atlantis, which docked on 10 June 2007.

Expedition 15 ended officially after Expedition 16 commander Peggy Whitson arrived at the station aboard Soyuz TMA-11 and the official change of command ceremony took place on 19 October 2007.

== Backup crew ==
- Roman Romanenko Commander – RSA
- Mikhail Korniyenko Flight Engineer – RSA
- Gregory Chamitoff Flight Engineer – NASA (for Anderson)

== Mission details ==
- Launch: 7 April 2007 17:31 UTC
- Docking: 9 April 2007 07:10 UTC
- Undocking: 21 October 2007 07:14 UTC
- Landing: 21 October 2007 10:46 UTC
- LandingSite: Ballistic Trajectory Landing Site northwest of Arkalyk

On 21 October 2007, after the separation of the Soyuz TMA-10 capsule, Moscow Mission Control reported that the Soyuz had entered into a ballistic trajectory, which resulted in a landing that was 340 kilometres (210 mi) short of the intended Kazakhstan landing site. Landing occurred without incident, and by 10:55 UTC, all crew members were out of the capsule, and the vehicle was secured. Until then, the only other time a Soyuz landing had resulted in a ballistic trajectory was the landing of Soyuz TMA-1, for Expedition 6. Another ballistic trajectory occurred with the landing of Soyuz TMA-11 on 19 April 2008 for Expedition 16.

=== EVAs ===
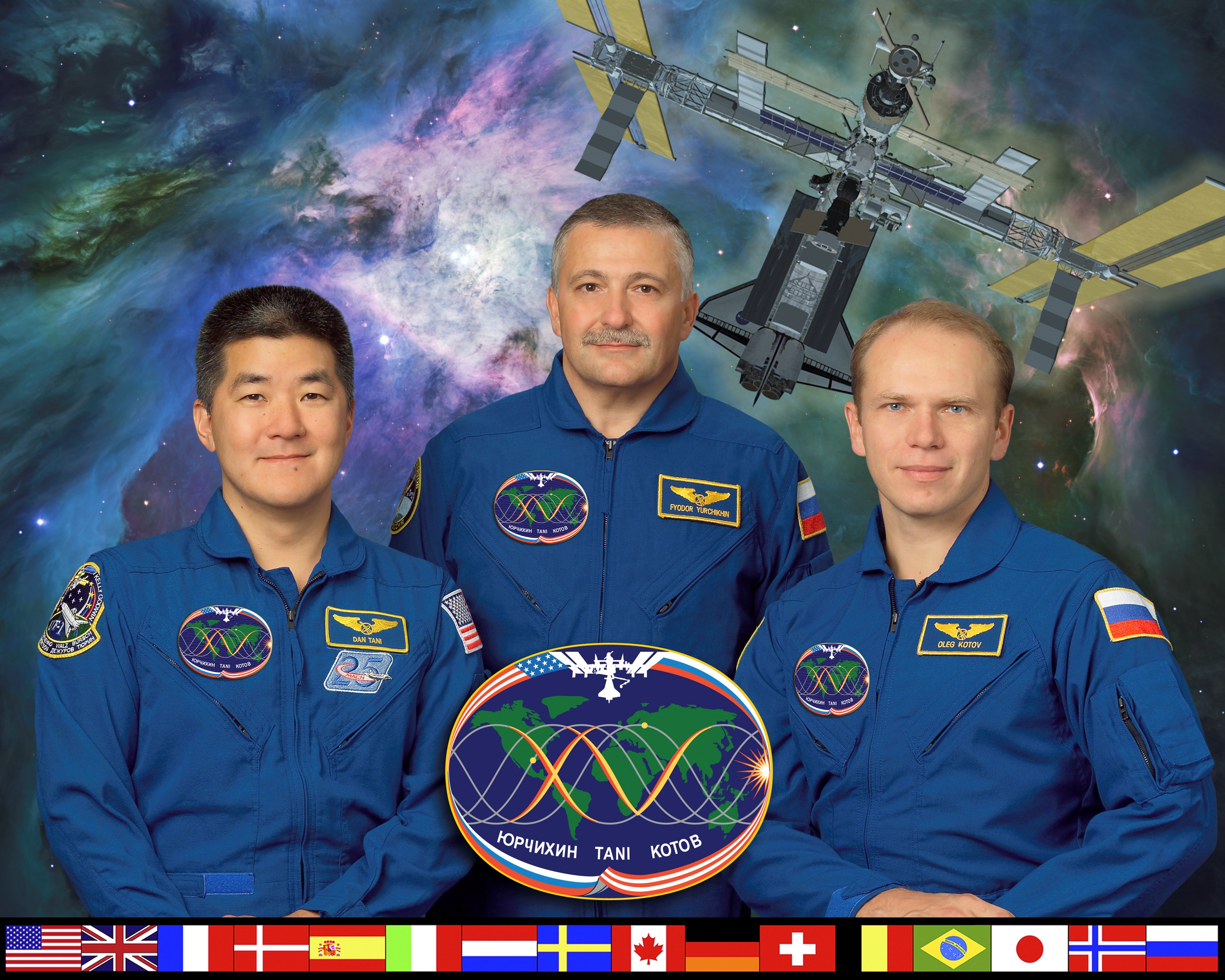
Original second portion of Expedition 15 crew portrait, from left to right: Daniel Tani, Yurchikhin, Kotov. Due to a change in schedule, Tani joined Expedition 16 in October 2007.

- EVA 1: 30 May 2007 – Yurchikhin/Kotov, 5 hours, 25 minutes.
- EVA 2: 6 June 2007 – Yurchikhin/Kotov, 5 hours, 37 minutes.
- EVA 3: 23 July 2007 – Yurchikhin/Anderson 7 hours, 41 minutes.
