= Expedition 16 =

16th Long-duration mission to the International Space Station

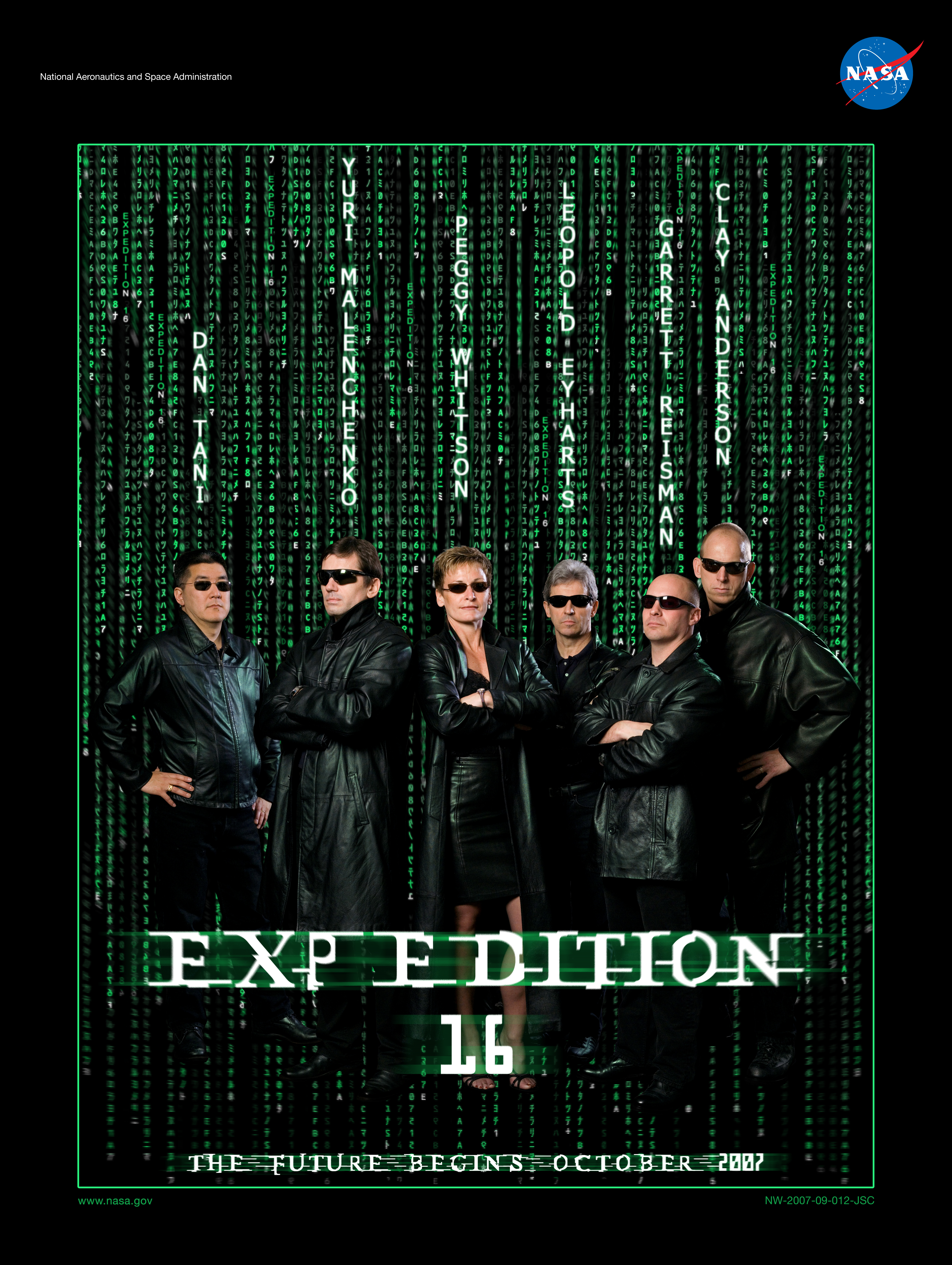
- Promotional Poster
- Mission type: Long-duration expedition
- Mission duration: 192 days (launch to landing)

Expedition
- Space station: International Space Station
- Began: 10 October 2007
- Ended: 19 April 2008, 10:30 UTC
- Arrived aboard: Soyuz TMA-11; Anderson: STS-117; Space Shuttle Atlantis; Tani: STS-120; Space Shuttle Discovery; Eyharts: STS-122; Space Shuttle Atlantis; Reisman: STS-123; Space Shuttle Endeavour
- Departed aboard: Soyuz TMA-11; Anderson: STS-120; Space Shuttle Discovery; Tani: STS-122; Space Shuttle Atlantis; Eyharts: STS-123; Space Shuttle Endeavour; Reisman: STS-124; Space Shuttle Discovery

Crew
- Crew size: 3
- Members: Peggy Whitson; Yuri Malenchenko; Clayton Anderson* (October); Daniel Tani (October–February); Léopold Eyharts (February–March); Garrett Reisman† (March–April) * - transferred from Expedition 15 † - transferred to Expedition 17
- EVAs: 5
- EVA duration: 35 hours, 21 minutes
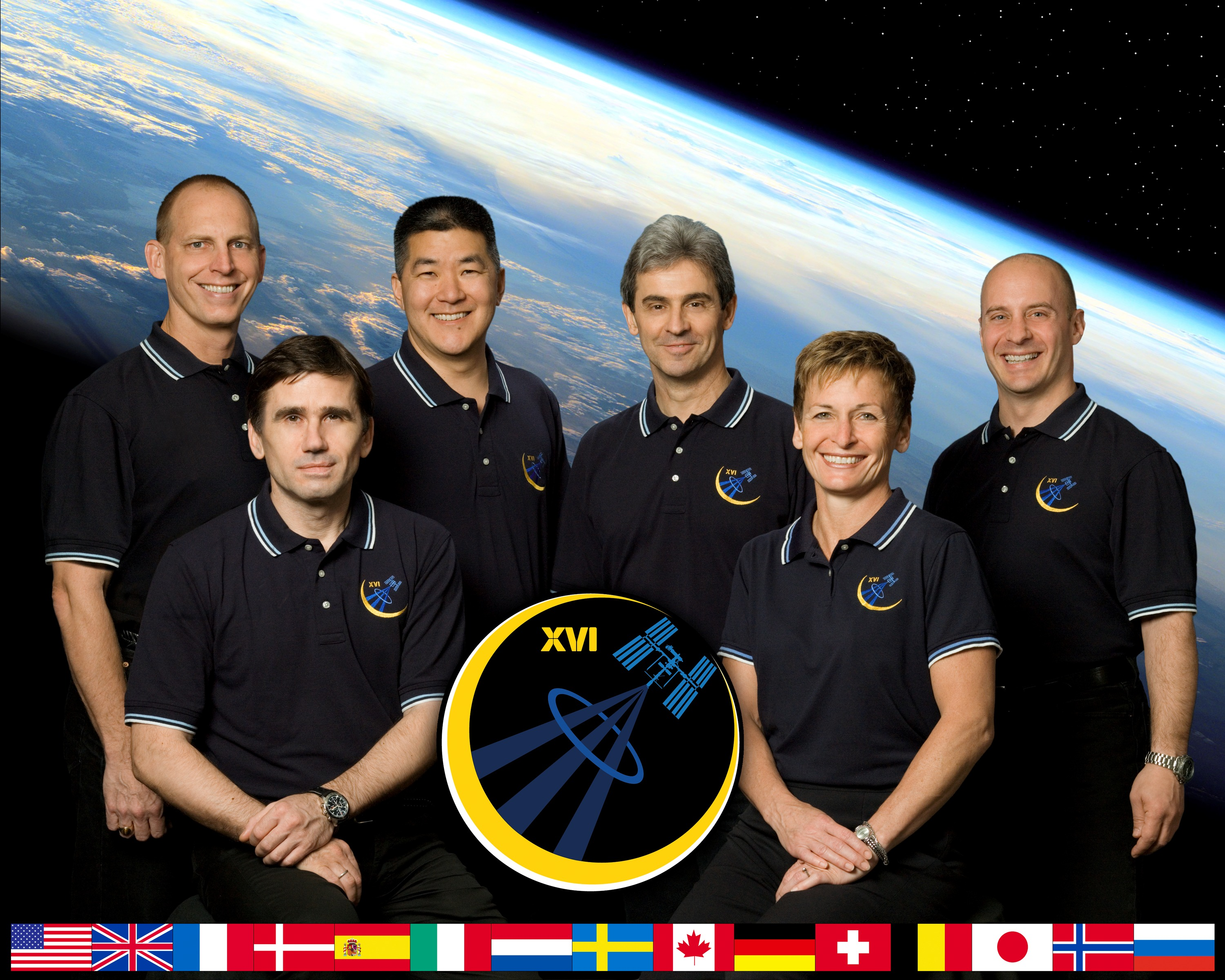
- Expedition 16 mission patch The official Expedition 16 crew portrait. (left to right) Anderson, Malenchenko, Tani, Eyharts, Whitson, Reisman ISS expeditions

Expedition 16 was the 16th expedition to the International Space Station (ISS). The first two crew members, Yuri Malenchenko and Peggy Whitson, launched on 10 October 2007, aboard Soyuz TMA-11, and were joined by spaceflight participant Sheikh Muszaphar Shukor, the first Malaysian in space.

Expedition 15 Flight Engineer Clayton Anderson did not land with the Soyuz TMA-10, so he was considered part of Expedition 16 for the few weeks prior to the arrival of STS-120. STS-120 launched on 23 October, docked on 25 October, and replaced Anderson with new Flight Engineer Daniel Tani. Following docking, the Soyuz seat liners for Anderson and Tani were swapped, and Anderson became part of the STS-120 crew. Léopold Eyharts, who came aboard during STS-122, joined the mission on 9 February 2008, replacing Tani. The crew was then joined by Garrett Reisman, who was launched aboard Endeavour with STS-123, on 11 March 2008, replacing Eyharts. Reisman joined Expedition 16 in progress, and was a part of Expedition 17 as well. Upon reentry, the astronaut's Soyuz TMA-11 spacecraft suffered a minor malfunction, causing the craft to follow a very steep ballistic descent. As a result, the crew experienced forces up to 10 G, ending up about 260 miles (418 km) west of the targeted landing site. Roscosmos reported all three crew members were doing just fine and in good health.

== Crew ==
Position	First Part (October 2007)	Second Part (October 2007 to February 2008)	Third Part (February to March 2008)	Fourth Part (March to April 2008)
Commander	Peggy Whitson, NASA; Second spaceflight			
Flight Engineer 1	Yuri Malenchenko, RSA; Fourth spaceflight			
Flight Engineer 2	Clayton Anderson, NASA; First spaceflight	Daniel Tani, NASA; Second and last spaceflight	Léopold Eyharts, ESA; Second and last spaceflight	Garrett Reisman, NASA; First spaceflight

== Backup crew ==
- Michael Fincke Commander - NASA (for Whitson)
- Salizhan Sharipov Flight Engineer 1 - RSA (for Malenchenko)
- Greg Chamitoff Flight Engineer 2 - NASA (for Anderson)
- Sandra Magnus Flight Engineer 2 - NASA (for Tani)
- Frank De Winne Flight Engineer 2 - ESA (for Eyharts)
- Timothy Kopra Flight Engineer 2 - NASA (for Reisman)

== Mission details ==
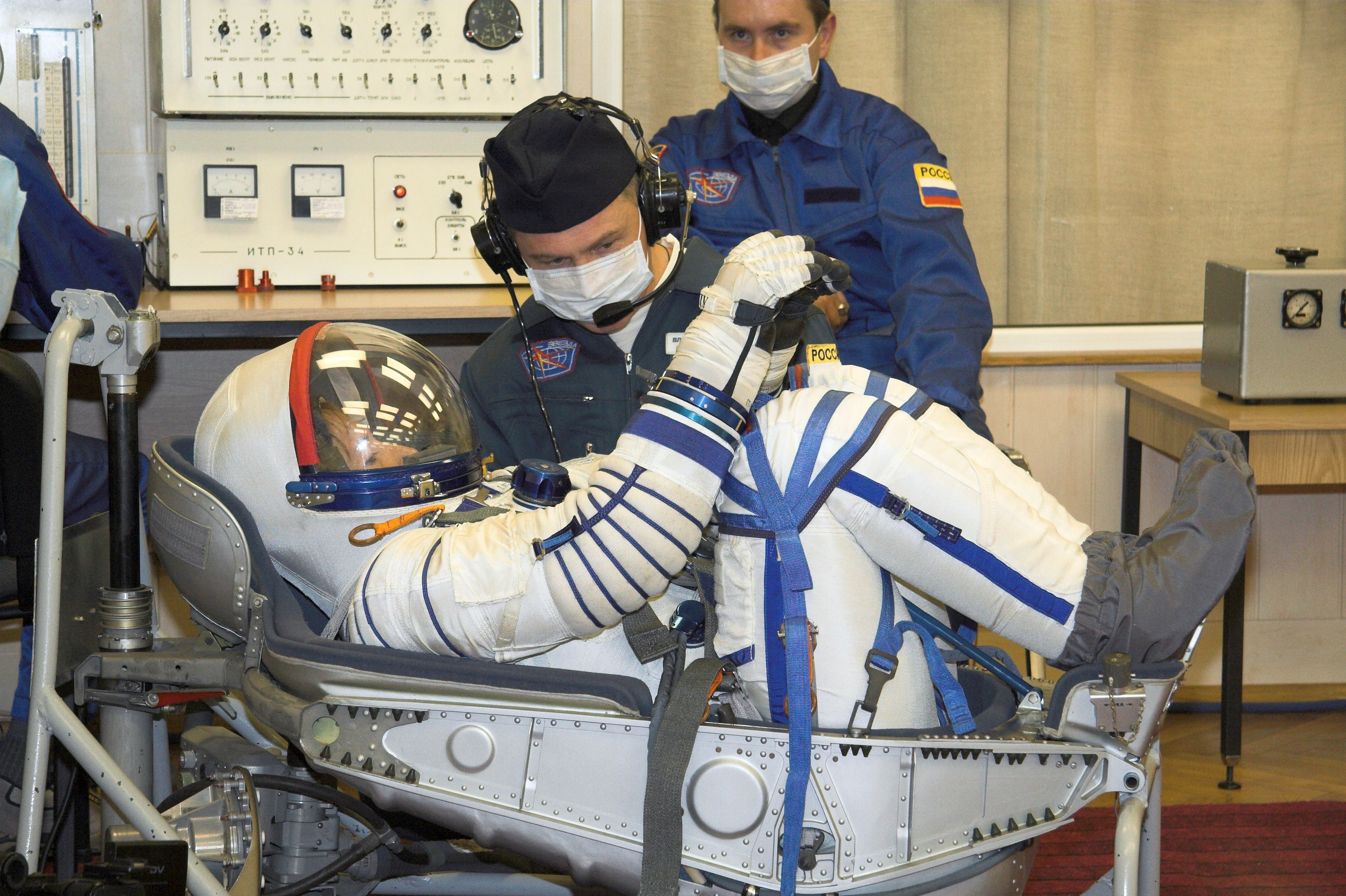
Peggy Whitson suited up in a pressurized Sokol space suit getting ready for Expedition 16.

- Docked: 12 October 2007 14:50 UTC
- Undocked: 19 April 2008 6:06 UTC
- Time docked: 192 days

Expedition 16 was the first ISS mission to include two crew members who had served on a previous expedition, and the first time a former commander (Malenchenko) returned as a flight engineer. Whitson was the first female commander of an ISS expedition, and with STS-120 commanded by female astronaut Pamela Melroy, it marked the first time that two female mission commanders were in orbit simultaneously. On her first expedition, Whitson implemented a "Friday night movie night" to help the crew wind down at the end of the week, and plans to keep the custom of adding some levity to the station going for Expedition 16. Anderson incorporated some entertainment into the daily planning conference with the ground, quizzing the ground team on a wide variety of subjects, and Michael Lopez-Alegria did a similar activity with movie and music trivia.

=== STS-120 ===
The first major objective of the increment was accomplished successfully on 26 October, when the crew of STS-120 delivered the Harmony module, and attached it to a temporary location on the Unity module. The new addition added over 2,500 cubic feet (71 m^{3}) to the station's living volume. The joint crews also moved the P6 truss, and relocated it from its position on top of the station, to its final port-side position, during the third of four spacewalks.

=== Configuration of Harmony ===
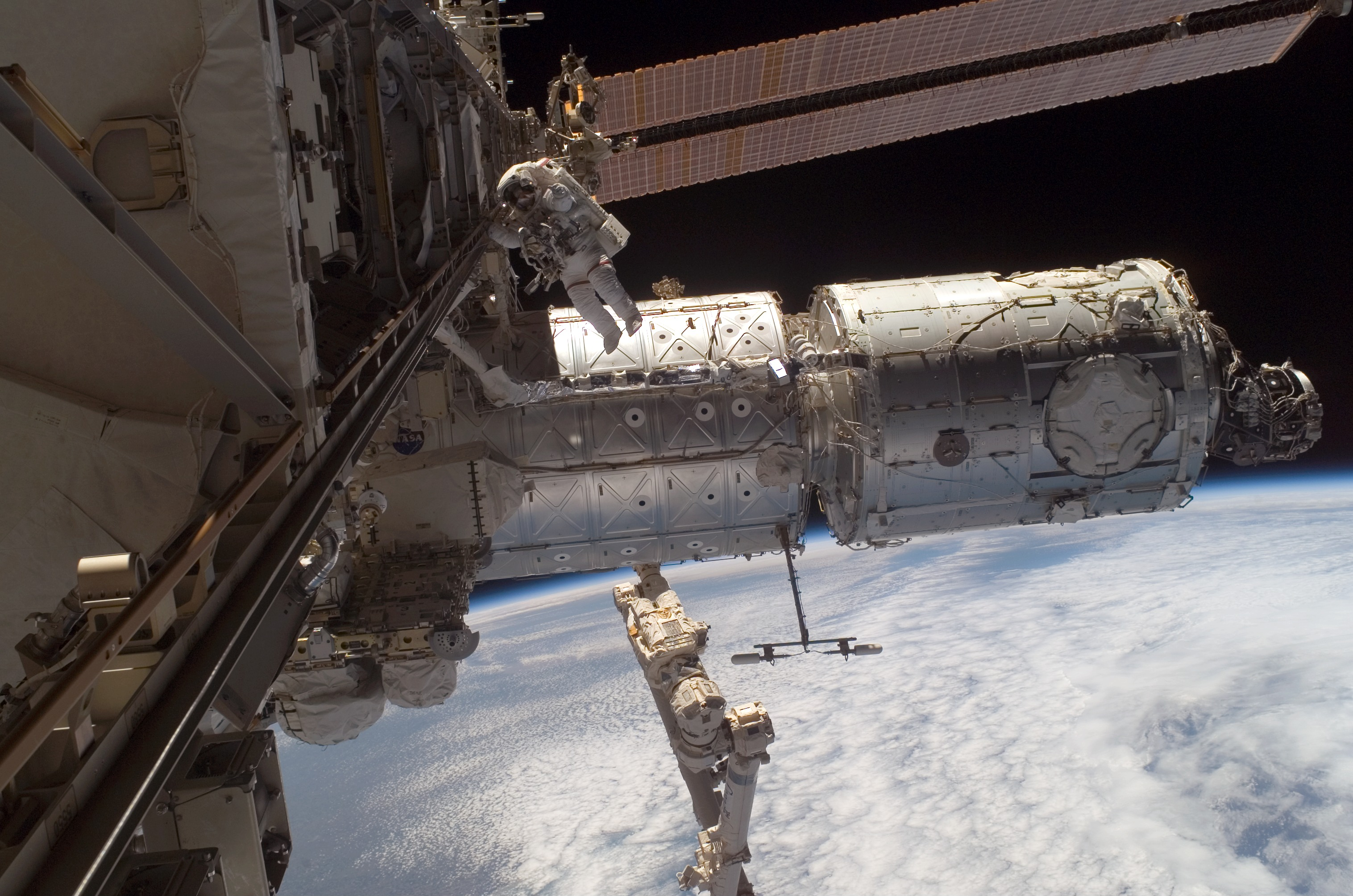
Expedition commander Peggy Whitson during the increment's third EVA. Behind Whitson, is the Destiny Laboratory Module, and Harmony.

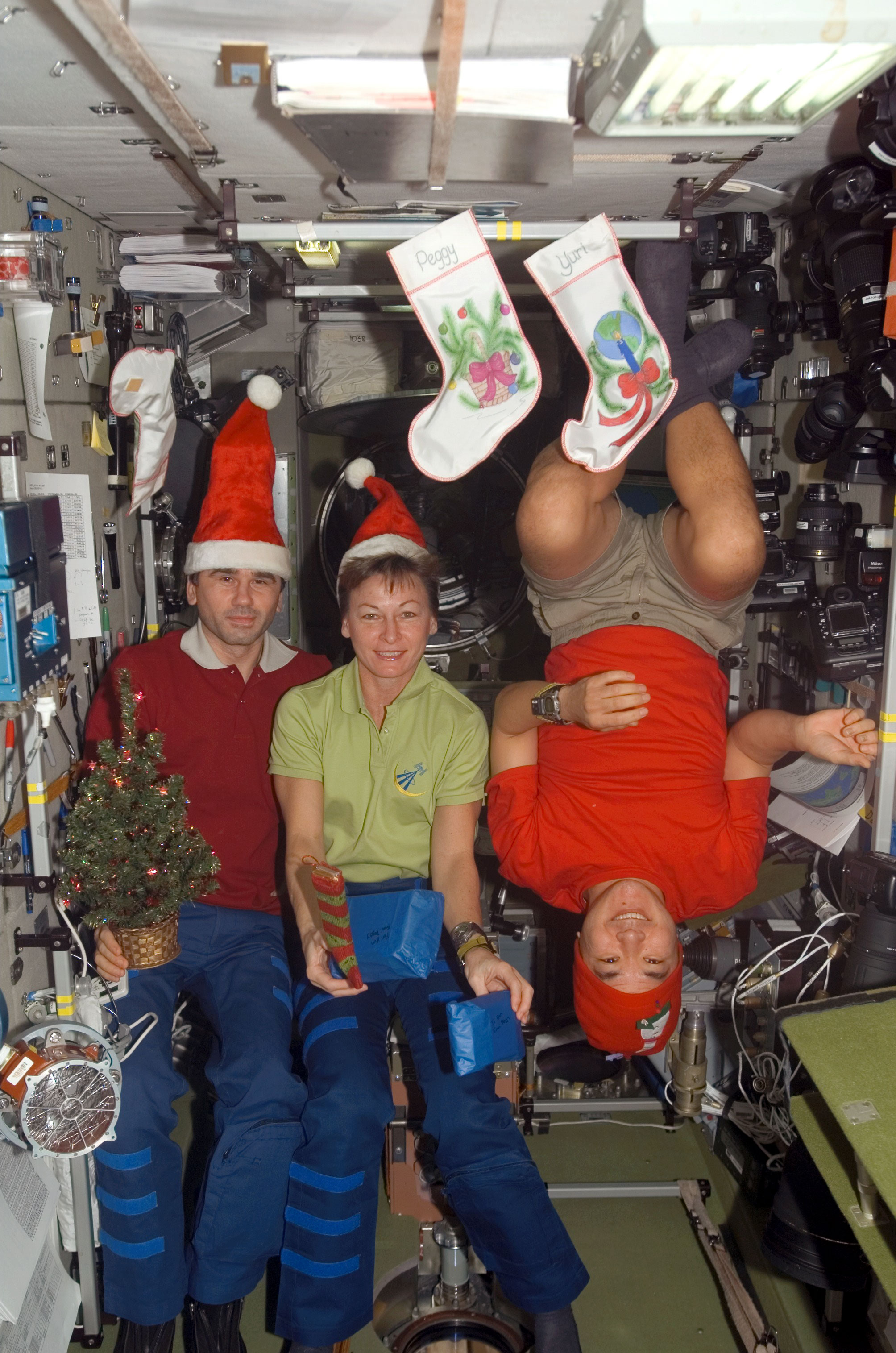
Crew members pose for a Christmas photo in Zvezda (ISS module)

Following the departure of STS-120, a series of Extra-vehicular activity (EVA) and robotic activities were carried out to move the Pressurized Mating Adapter (PMA-2) from the end of the Destiny laboratory, to the end of Harmony. Whitson and Malenchenko carried out the increment's first EVA on 9 November, that prepared the docking port for relocation. On 12 November, Whitson and Tani used the station's Mobile Servicing System (robotic arm) to detach the docking port, and relocated it to the forward port of Harmony. On 14 November, the Tani and Whitson again used the robotic arm and moved Harmony from its temporary location, to its permanent location on the forward port of Destiny.

On 20 November, Whitson and Tani completed the second EVA for the increment, a 7-hour, 16-minute spacewalk to outfit the Harmony node in its new position. All tasks were accomplished, and three get-ahead tasks were performed. On 24 November, Whitson and Tani completed the third EVA for the increment, a 7-hour, 4-minute spacewalk to complete the outfitting of Harmony. All task were accomplished, and photographic inspection of the starboard Solar Alpha Rotary Joint (SARJ) was performed, as well as some ISS maintenance get-ahead tasks.

=== EVA milestone ===
On 18 December 2007, during the fourth spacewalk of Expedition 16 to inspect the S4 starboard Solar Alpha Rotary Joint (SARJ), the ground team in Mission Control informed Whitson that she had become the female astronaut with the most cumulative EVA time in NASA history, as well as the most EVAs, with her fifth EVA. Three hours and 37 minutes into the spacewalk, Whitson surpassed NASA astronaut Sunita Williams with a total time at that point of 29 hours and 18 minutes. At the completion of Whitson's fifth EVA, the 100th in support of ISS assembly and maintenance, Whitson's cumulative EVA time became 32 hours, and 36 minutes, which placed her in 20th place for total EVA time.

=== STS-122 ===
STS-122 delivered Columbus and replaced Dan Tani with Léopold Eyharts.

=== STS-123 ===
STS-123 delivered the first element of Kibō and replaced Léopold Eyharts with Garrett Reisman.

=== ATV Jules-Verne ===
Expedition 16 also saw the arrival of the first Automated Transfer Vehicle (ATV) to the station, named Jules Verne after the science fiction author.

=== Soyuz TMA-12 ===
Expedition 16 also saw the arrival of the first Korean astronaut, Yi So-yeon.

== Extra-vehicular activity ==
Mission	Spacewalkers	Start (UTC)	End (UTC)	Duration
EVA 1	Peggy Whitson; Yuri Malenchenko	9 November 2007; 09:54	9 November, 16:49	6 hours, 55 minutes
EVA 1	SSPTS cable disconnect and stowage, PMA-2 umbilical stowage, Node 2 avionics umbilical temp stowed.			
EVA 2	Whitson; Daniel M. Tani	20 November 2007; 10:10	20 November, 17:26	7 hours, 16 minutes
EVA 2	External configuration of PMA-2 and Harmony: Fluid, electrical, and data line hookups, avionics line hookup, heater cable hookups, Fluid tray relocation.			
EVA 3	Whitson; Tani	24 November 2007; 09:50	24 November, 16:54	7 hours, 04 minutes
EVA 3	Completion of fluid, electrical, and data line hookups for PMA-2 and Harmony. Loop B Fluid Tray connection to port side of Destiny. Photographic analysis of starboard Solar Alpha Rotary Joint (SARJ) to assist with troubleshooting on the ground, re-installation of CETA cart from a temporary stowage location.			
EVA 4	Whitson; Tani	18 December 2007; 09:50	18 December, 16:46	6 hours, 56 minutes
EVA 4	Inspection of the S4 starboard Solar Alpha Rotary Joint (SARJ), and a Beta Gimbal Assembly (BGA). The EVA is the 100th in support of building the International Space Station.			
EVA 5	Whitson; Tani	30 January 2008; 09:56	30 January, 17:06	7 hours, 10 minutes
EVA 5	Replacement of a Bearing Motor Roll Ring Module (BMRRM) in the S4 starboard Beta Gimbal Assembly (BGA), further inspection of the Solar Alpha Rotary Joint (SARJ).			
