= Soyuz TMA-10 =

2007 Russian crewed spaceflight to the ISS

- Operator: Roscosmos
- COSPAR ID: 2007-008A
- SATCAT no.: 31100
- Mission duration: 196 days, 17 hours

Spacecraft properties
- Spacecraft type: Soyuz-TMA 11F732
- Manufacturer: Energia

Crew
- Crew size: 3
- Members: Oleg V. Kotov; Fyodor Yurchikhin
- Launching: Charles Simonyi
- Landing: Sheikh Muszaphar Shukor
- Callsign: Pulsar

Start of mission
- Launch date: April 7, 2007, 17:31:09 UTC
- Rocket: Soyuz-FG
- Launch site: Baikonur 1/5

End of mission
- Landing date: October 21, 2007, 10:36 UTC
- Landing site: west of Arkalyk

Orbital parameters
- Reference system: Geocentric
- Regime: Low Earth

Docking with ISS
- Docking port: Zarya nadir
- Docking date: 9 April 2007; 19:10 UTC
- Undocking date: 27 September 2007; 20:20 UTC
- Time docked: 171d 1h 10m

Docking with ISS (Relocation)
- Docking port: Zvezda aft
- Docking date: 27 September 2007; 20:47 UTC
- Undocking date: 21 October 2007; 07:14 UTC
- Time docked: 23d 10h 27m
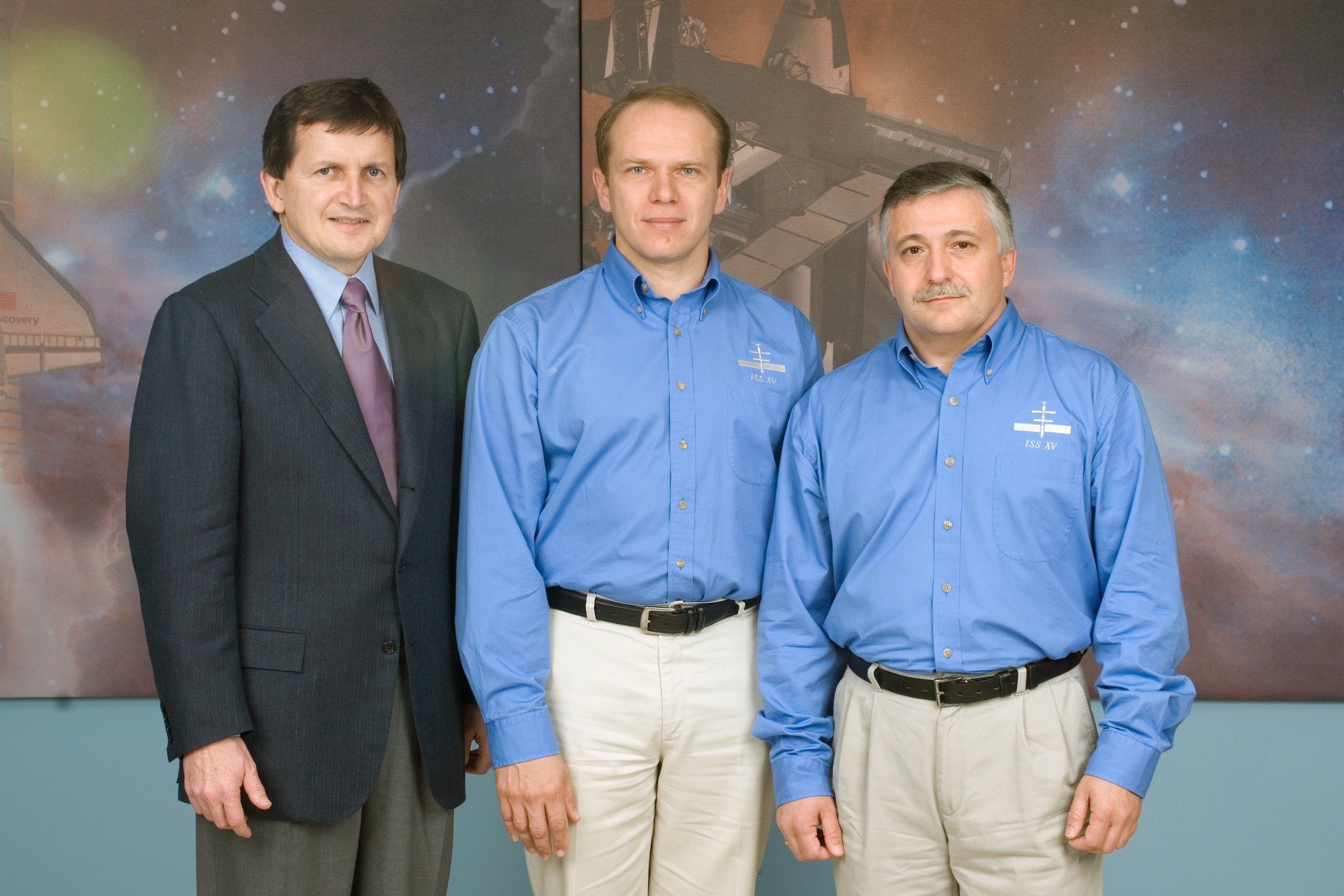
- From left to right: Charles Simonyi, Oleg Kotov, Fyodor Yurchikhin Soyuz programme (Crewed missions)

Soyuz TMA-10 was a human spaceflight mission using a Soyuz-TMA spacecraft to transport personnel to and from the International Space Station (ISS). The mission began at 17:31:09 UTC on April 7, 2007 when the spacecraft was launched from the Baikonur Cosmodrome by a Soyuz FG launch vehicle. Soyuz TMA-10 brought to the station two members of ISS Expedition 15 crew, along with one spaceflight participant. It remained at the space station as an escape craft until it was replaced by Soyuz TMA-11 in October 2007.

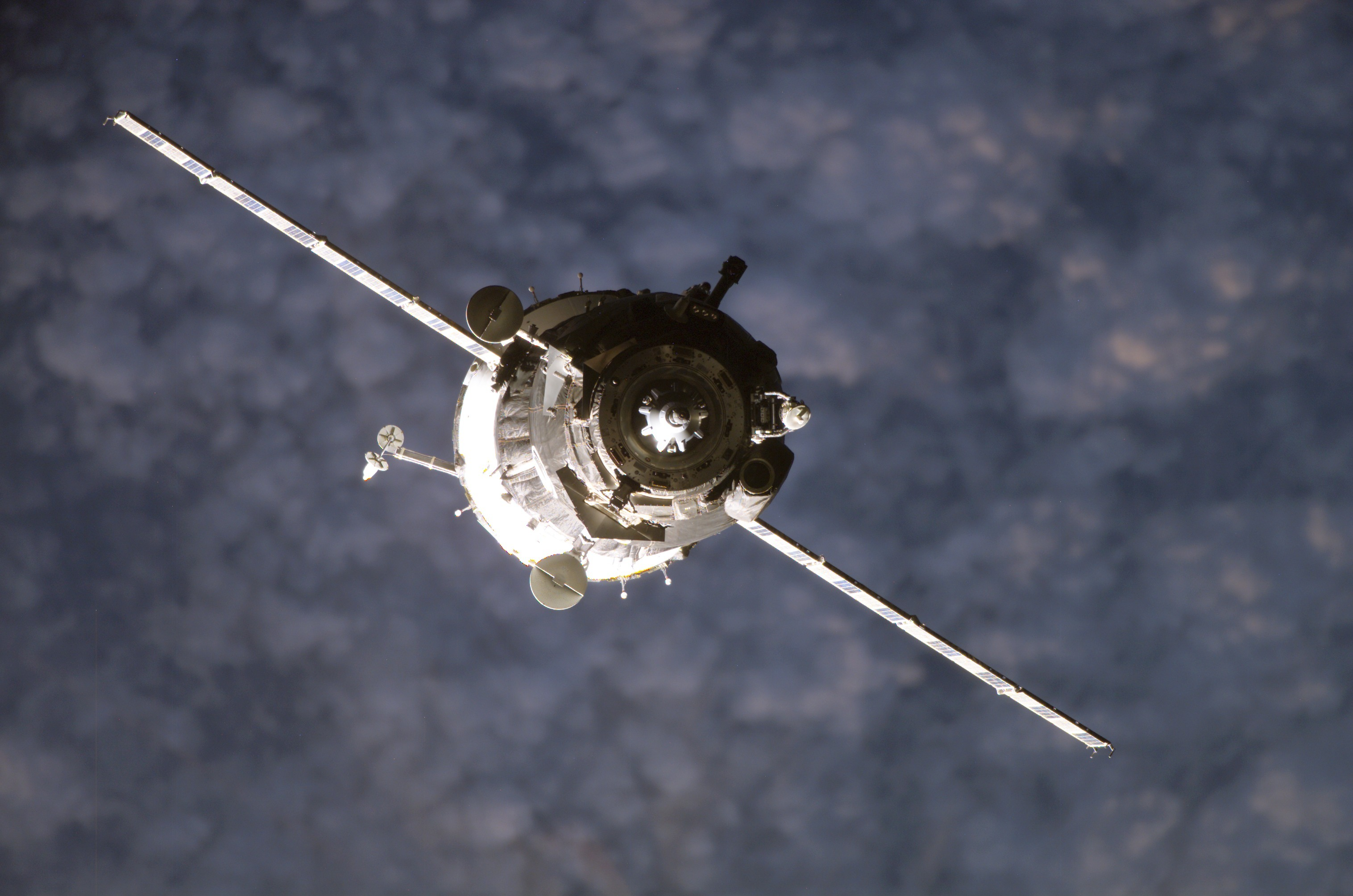
Soyuz TMA-10 spacecraft approaches the International Space Station.

== Crew ==
| Position | Launching crew | Landing crew |
|---|---|---|
| Commander | (Russia) Oleg Kotov, Roscosmos; Expedition 15; First spaceflight | |
| Flight Engineer | (Russia) Fyodor Yurchikhin, Roscosmos; Expedition 15; Second spaceflight | |
| Spaceflight Participant | (Hungary) / (United States) Charles Simonyi, SA; First spaceflight Tourist | (Malaysia) Sheikh Muszaphar Shukor, ANGKASA; Only spaceflight |

=== Backup crew ===
| Position | Crew |
|---|---|
| Commander | (Russia) Roman Romanenko, Roscosmos |
| Flight Engineer | (Russia) Mikhail Korniyenko, Roscosmos |

== Docking with ISS ==
- Docked to ISS: 9 April 2007, 19:10 UTC (to nadir port of Zarya)
- Undocking from ISS: 27 September 2007 20:20 UTC (from nadir port of Zarya)
- Docking to ISS: 27 September 2007 20:47 UTC (to aft port of Zvezda)
- Undocking from ISS: 21 October 2007 07:14 UTC (from aft port of Zvezda)

== Mission highlights ==
Soyuz TMA-10 docked to the ISS on April 9, 2007 at 22:10 UTC, following two days of free flight. Its two Russian crew members remained on the station until the spacecraft's return to Earth in October 2007. Spaceflight participant Charles Simonyi returned to Earth aboard Soyuz TMA-9 on April 21, following eleven days of ISS handover operations.

TMA-10 undocked from the ISS at 07:14 UTC on October 21, and deorbit occurred at 09:47. During atmospheric re-entry, the spacecraft transitioned to a ballistic reentry, resulting in it landing west of Arkalyk, approximately 340 km (210 mi) northwest of the intended Kazakhstan landing site. The trajectory was reported by the crew as soon as they came out of the communications blackout caused by plasma surrounding the spacecraft. (A ballistic trajectory is a backup re-entry mode that takes over if something fails during normal re-entry.) A Commission of Inquiry determined that the ballistic re-entry was caused by damage to a cable in the spacecraft's control panel, which connected to the control panel with the Soyuz descent equipment. Landing occurred at 10:36 GMT. A ballistic trajectory entry had happened previously, with the Soyuz TMA-1 mission that returned Expedition 6. The information about the failure of a connector in service panel was faulty. In actuality, the Service module (PAO) had failed to separate from the re-entry module (SA), and the ship had entered the atmosphere with the opposite orientation. Explosive bolts in connection struts between the Re-entry module and the Service module had failed to explode. The heat had melted the failed struts and the re-entry module had separated from the service module - the changed trajectory of the ship had caused the switch to a ballistic emergency landing. The same situation had happened during the Soyuz 5 mission in 1969. The Soyuz re-entry module was, and still is, protected on all sides with thermal insulation, so the struts melted before the crew entry hatch was damaged or destroyed, thus saving the crew. The Russians kept the failure of the Soyuz TMA-10 a secret until it happened again on the Soyuz TMA-11 with a NASA astronaut on board. This infuriated NASA (the Commission of Inquiry had lied to them) and this led to further investigation as well as special EVA activity on the ISS to check the docked Soyuz TMA-12 and its explosive bolts in their connection struts.
