= Clayton Anderson =

American astronaut (born 1959)

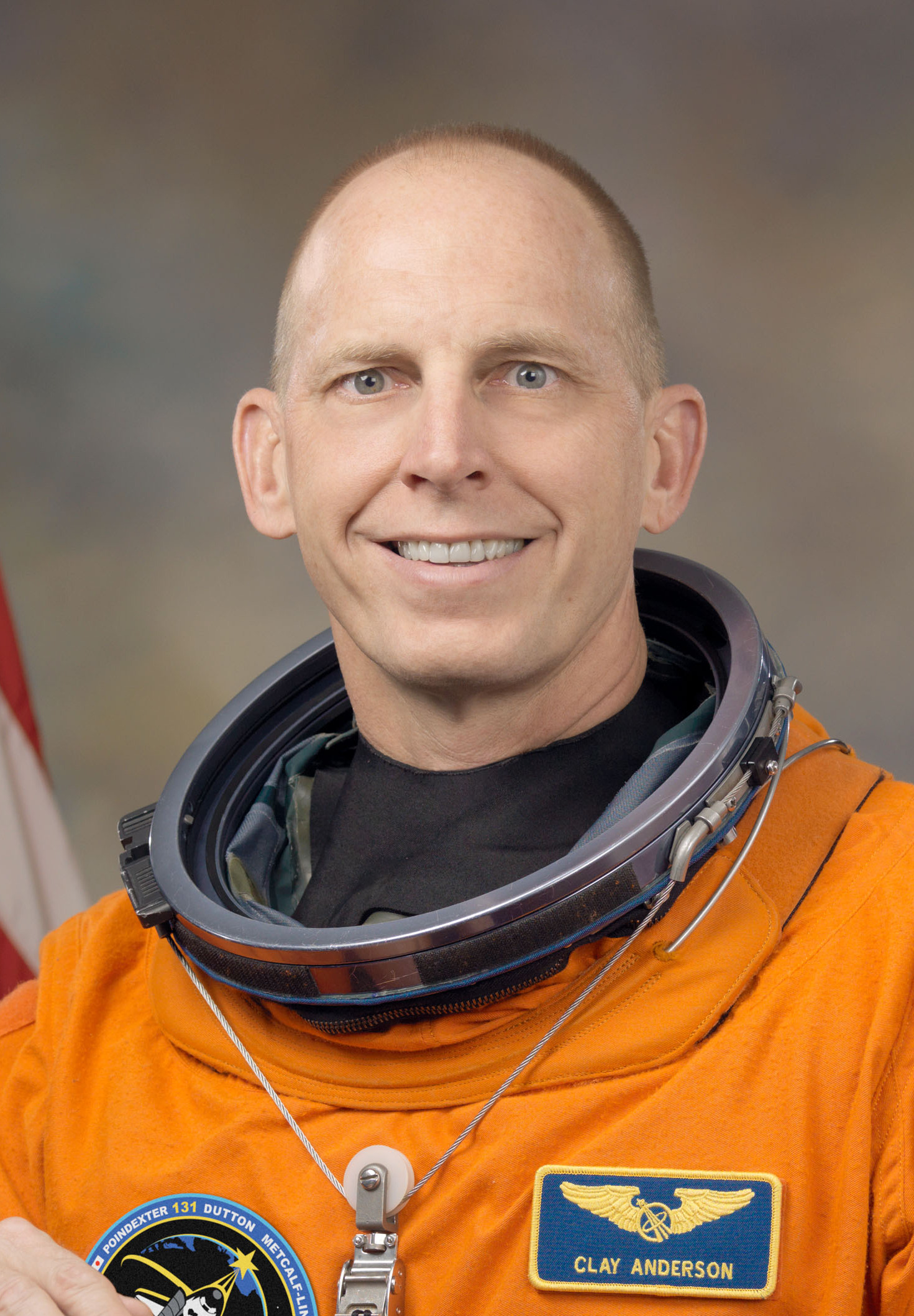
- Anderson in 2009
- Born: Clayton Conrad Anderson; February 23, 1959 (age 67); Omaha, Nebraska, U.S.
- Education: Hastings College (BS); Iowa State University (MS)
- Space career

NASA astronaut
- Time in space: 166d 21h 10m
- Selection: NASA Group 17 (1998)
- Total EVAs: 6
- Total EVA time: 38h 28m
- Missions: Expedition 15/16 (STS-117/STS-120); STS-131
- Mission insignia

Clayton Conrad Anderson (born February 23, 1959) is a retired NASA astronaut. Launched on STS-117, he replaced Sunita Williams on June 10, 2007 as a member of the ISS Expedition 15 crew. He is currently an author, a motivational speaker, and a Professor of Practice at Iowa State University in Ames, Iowa. In 2022, he became the president and CEO of the Strategic Air Command & Aerospace Museum.

== Early life and education ==
Anderson graduated from Ashland-Greenwood High School, Ashland, Nebraska, 1977, received a Bachelor of Science degree (cum laude) in physics at Hastings College, Nebraska, in 1981 and a Master of Science degree in aerospace engineering at Iowa State University in 1983.

== NASA career ==
=== Early non-astronaut duties ===
Anderson joined Johnson Space Center in 1983 in the Mission Planning and Analysis Division, performing rendezvous and proximity operations trajectory designs for early Space Shuttle and International Space Station missions. In 1988, he moved to the Mission Operations Directorate (MOD) as a Flight Design Manager, leading the trajectory design team for the Galileo mission to Jupiter (STS-34) while serving as the backup for the Magellan mission to Venus (STS-31). In 1989, Anderson was chosen to be supervisor of the MOD Ascent Flight Design Section and, following reorganization, the Flight Design Engineering Office of the Flight Design and Dynamics Division. In 1993, he was named the Chief of the Flight Design Branch. From 1996 until his selection as an astronaut, Anderson held the post of Manager, Emergency Operations Center, NASA Johnson Space Center.

=== Astronaut duties ===
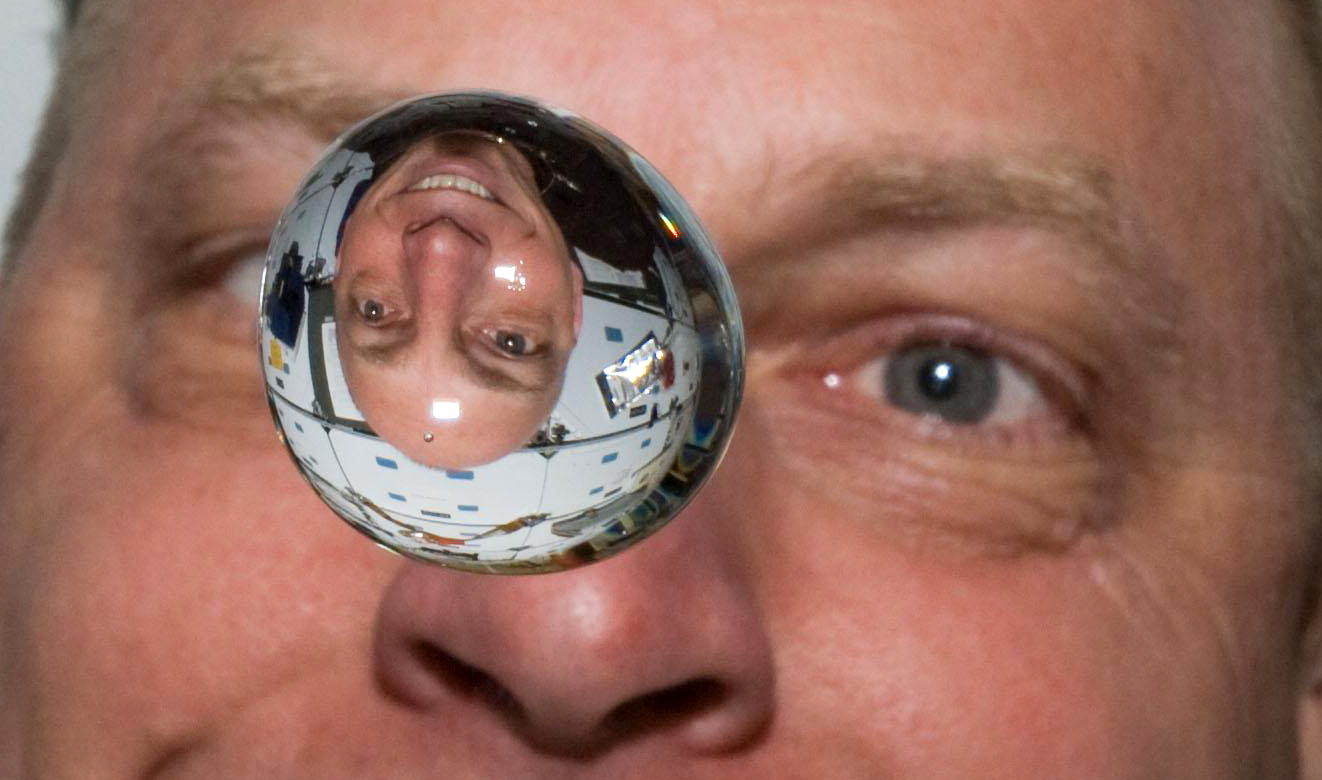
Anderson watches as a water bubble floats in front of him on the Space Shuttle Discovery during the STS-131 mission.

Selected as an astronaut candidate by NASA in June 1998, he reported for training in August of that year. Training included orientation briefings and tours, numerous scientific and technical briefings, intensive instruction in Shuttle and International Space Station (ISS) systems, physiological training, ground school to prepare for T-38 flight training, as well as learning water and wilderness survival techniques.

Prior to being assigned to a spaceflight, Anderson served as the lead for the Enhanced Caution and Warning (ECW) System development effort within the Space Shuttle Cockpit Avionics Upgrade (CAU) Project. Previously, he was the crew support astronaut for ISS Expedition 4, providing ground support on technical issues in addition to supporting the crew families. Anderson also served as an ISS Capsule Communicator (CAPCOM) and as the Astronaut Office crew representative for the Station's electrical power system. In November 2002, Anderson completed training in the Extravehicular Activity (EVA) Skills program. He was back-up flight engineer for Expedition 12, Expedition 13 and Expedition 14 to the International Space Station.

Anderson served as an astronaut family escort for the STS-107 mission at the request of Rick Husband.

In June 2003, Anderson served as an aquanaut during the NEEMO 5 mission aboard the Aquarius underwater laboratory, living and working underwater for fourteen days. During a NEEMO 5 underwater EVA, Anderson cut his thumb with a knife. The wound was stitched up by hand surgeon and extreme medicine specialist Kenneth Kamler, who was observing the NEEMO project and dove to Aquarius to perform the procedure.

He was a mission specialist on STS-131, launched in April 2010. The primary payload of this mission was a Multi-Purpose Logistics Module loaded with supplies and equipment for the International Space Station.

==== International Space Station ====
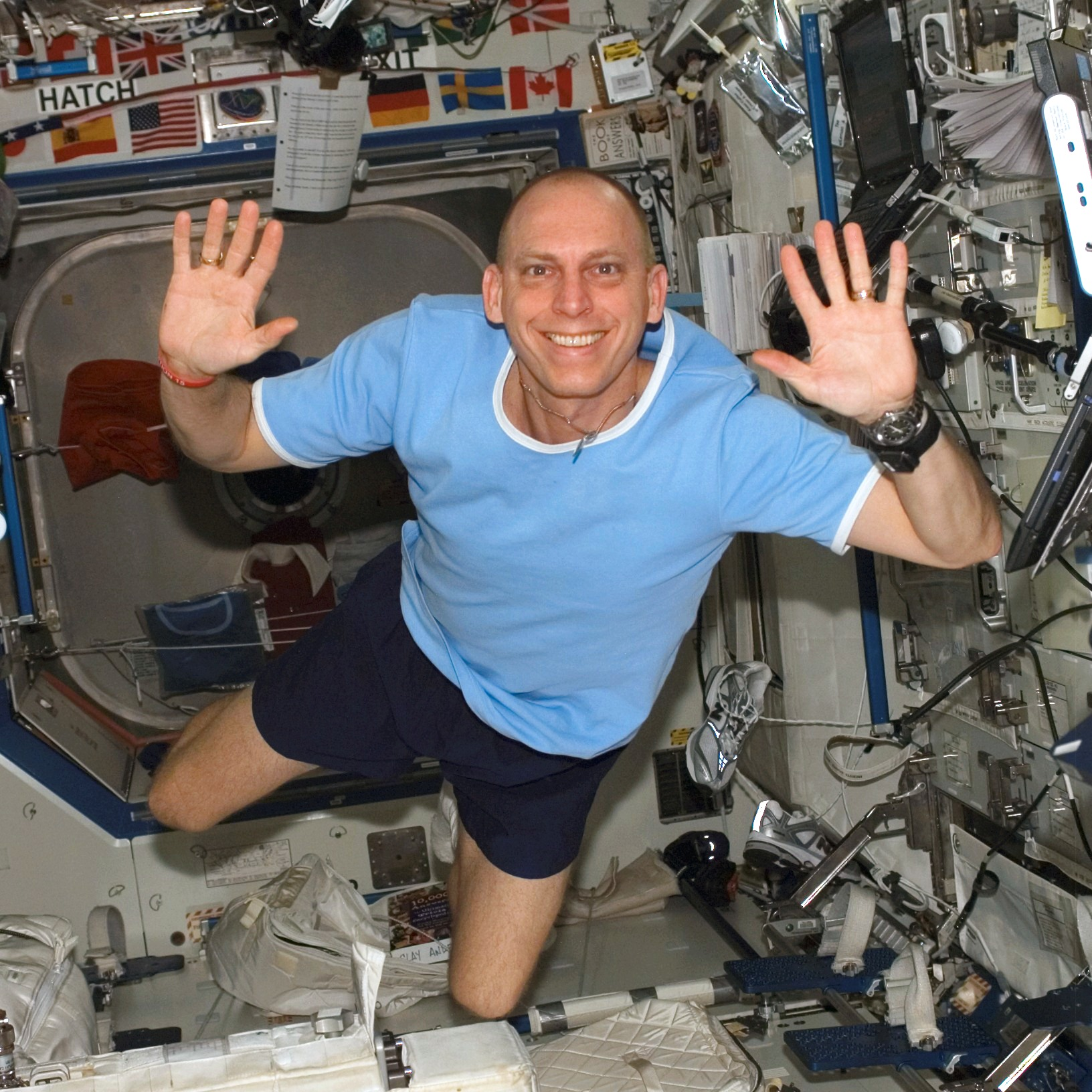
Anderson in the Destiny module of the International Space Station

Anderson was a member of the Expedition 15 crew and spent 152 days on board the International Space Station. He launched to the station aboard Shuttle Atlantis as mission specialist 5 for the STS-117 mission on June 8, 2007, and remained on board as a member of the Expedition 16 crew before returning to earth aboard Discovery on mission STS-120 on November 7, 2007. On return his official title was mission specialist 5. Two of the photos that he took during his July and August 2007 spacewalks were listed on Popular Science's photo gallery of the best astronaut selfies.

Anderson continued a tradition aboard the International Space Station, started by Michael Lopez-Alegria, of conducting daily "trivia" contests with mission control team members on the ground. During Alegria's seven-month stay on the station he would routinely call down movie quotes and challenge the team members to determine the movie the quote was from. Towards the end of his mission, he changed to music trivia playing a portion of a song and challenging the team to complete the line. Anderson has taken this tradition and put his own personal twist on it, using the "Book of Answers: The New York Public Library Telephone Reference Service's Most Unusual and Entertaining Questions". Anderson often played song clips for the ground control team, or specific individuals, most notably when he played the song "(Everything I Do) I Do It for You" by Bryan Adams for his wife on her birthday.

== After NASA ==
May 2022 - June 2025, he served as the president and CEO of the Strategic Air Command & Aerospace Museum, a museum in his hometown of Ashland.

== Personal life ==
Anderson was born in Omaha but considers Ashland, Nebraska to be his hometown. Married to Susan Jane Anderson (née Harreld) of Elkhart, Indiana. They have two children, a son and a daughter. His mother, Alice J. Anderson, died in December 2007, shortly after his return to Earth. His father, John T. Anderson, is deceased.

Like many of the other astronauts and cosmonauts, he is a licensed amateur radio operator having passed the technician class license exam in 2001 and was issued the call sign KD5PLA by the Federal Communications Commission on August 13, 2001. During his stay on the ISS in September 2007, he used one of the two amateur radio stations on board to talk with school children.

Anderson is the first and only astronaut from Nebraska and was widely reported in news media as the astronaut rejected fourteen times by NASA before being accepted in 1998. Anderson eventually retired from NASA in January 2013 after serving fifteen years and is now in education.

== Organizations ==
Southwest Basketball Officials Association; former Men's College Basketball Official: Red River Athletic, Southern Collegiate Athletic, Heart of Texas, Lone Star, and Texas/New Mexico Junior College Athletic Conferences; Aircraft Owners and Pilots Association (AOPA); Johnson Space Center Employee Activities Association: vice president of athletics (1987–1992); Clear Lake Optimist Club past president and vice president. Alpha Chi National Scholastic Honor Society, Hastings College, Hastings Nebraska (1980–1981). American Legion Cornhusker Boys State Alumni

== Awards and honors ==
- Author of So You Want to be an Astronaut (Sleeping Bear Press, 2023), Illustrator Iris Amaya
- Author of Letters from Space (Sleeping Bear Press, 2020), Illustrator Susan Batori
- Author of It's a Question of Space: An Ordinary Astronaut's Answers to Sometimes Extraordinary Questions (University of Nebraska Press, 2018)
- Author of A is for Astronaut: Blasting Through the Alphabet (Sleeping Bear Press, 2018), Illustrator Scott Brundage
- Author of The Ordinary Spaceman: From Boyhood Dreams to Astronaut (University of Nebraska Press, 2015)
- The Jason Award, Children's Square United States (2015)
- Tom Osborne Leadership Award, Leadership Hastings (NE) (2012)
- NASA Spaceflight Medal (2008, 2011);
- NASA Exceptional Service Medal (2008, 2011);
- Russian Federation Medal for Merit in Space Exploration (2011);
- Charles Bessey Medal, University of Nebraska (2010),
- Outstanding Alumnus, Iowa State University (2008);
- Honorary Doctorate Degree from Hastings College, 2004;
- Distinguished Alumnus Award, National Council of Alpha Chi 2001;
- NASA Quality and Safety Achievement Recognition (QASAR) Award 1998;
- NCAA National Christian College Basketball Championships Official (1997, 1998);
- JSC Certificate of Commendation (1993);
- Outstanding Young Man of America (1981, 1985, 1987);
- Bronco Award Winner, Hastings College (1981).
