= Space tourism =

Human space travel for recreation

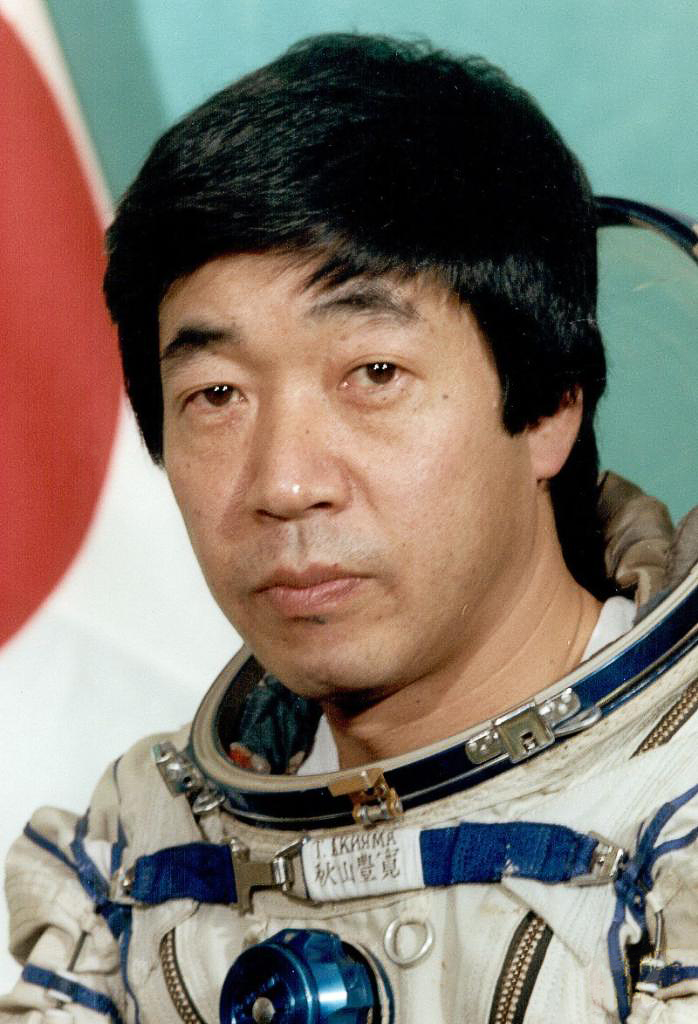
Toyohiro Akiyama spent seven days on the Mir space station in 1990, becoming the first civilian to fly aboard a commercial space flight.

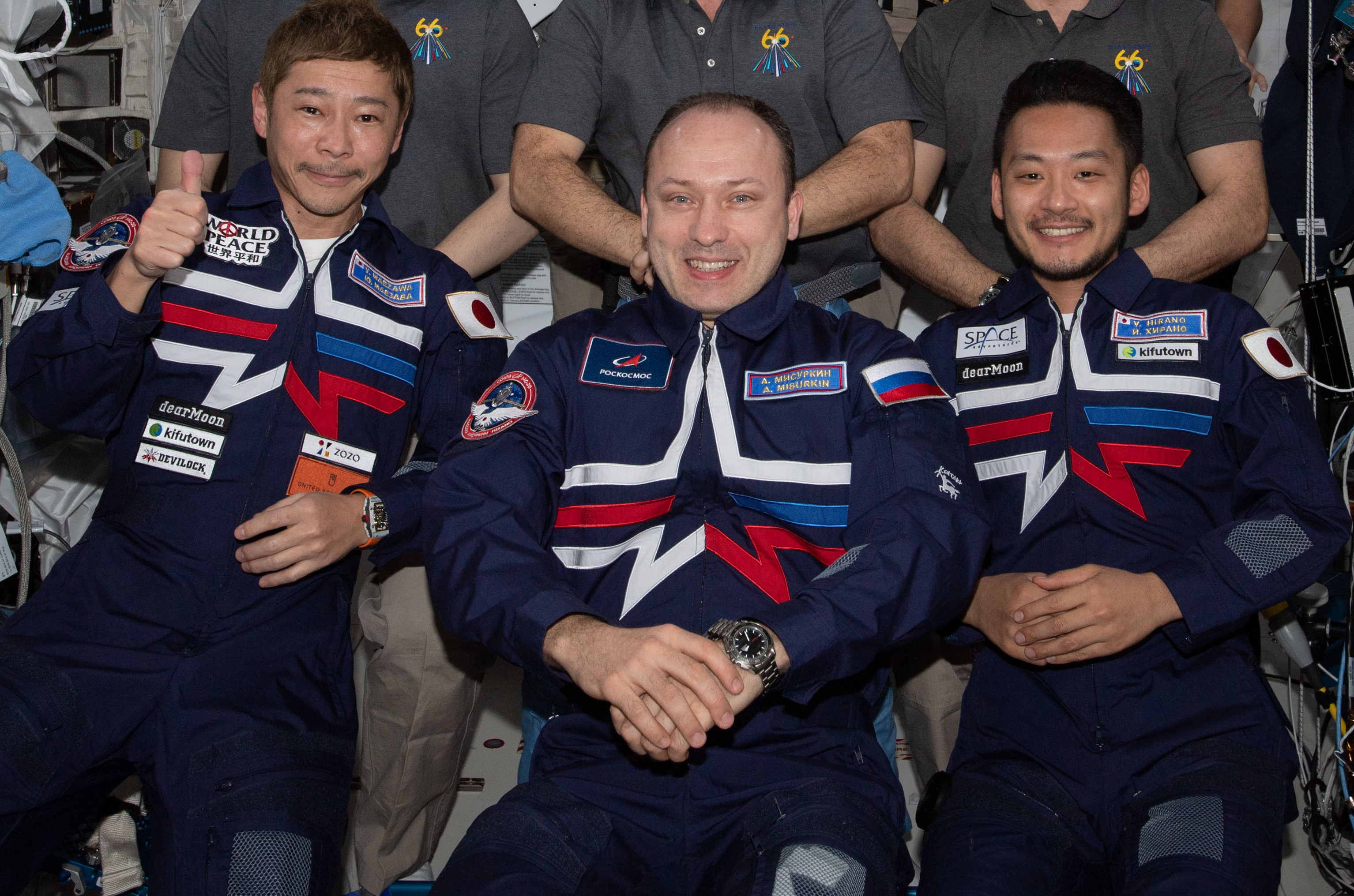
Soyuz MS-20 crew on the International Space Station, from left to right: Yusaku Maezawa (Spaceflight Participant), Alexander Misurkin (cosmonaut), and Yozo Hirano (Spaceflight Participant).

Space tourism is human space travel for recreational purposes. There are several different types of space tourism, including orbital, suborbital and lunar space tourism. Tourists are motivated by the possibility of viewing Earth from space, feeling weightlessness, experiencing extremely high speed, and contributing to science.

Space tourism started in April 2001, when American businessman and engineer Dennis Tito became the first ever space tourist to travel to space aboard a Soyuz-TM32 spacecraft. During the period from 2001 to 2009, seven space tourists made eight space flights aboard a Russian Soyuz spacecraft to the International Space Station, brokered by American company Space Adventures in conjunction with Roscosmos and RSC Energia. Iranian-American businesswoman Anousheh Ansari became the first ever female space tourist in September 2006. The publicized price was in the range of 20–25 million USD per trip. Some space tourists have signed contracts with third parties to conduct certain research activities while in orbit. By 2007, space tourism was thought to be one of the earliest markets that would emerge for commercial spaceflight.

Space tourists need to be in good physical form before going to space. In particular, they have to train for fast acceleration or g-forces in a centrifuge and weightlessness by flying in a high-altitude jet plane doing parabolic arcs. They may have to learn how to operate and even fix parts of the spaceship using simulators.

Russia halted orbital space tourism in 2010 due to the increase in the International Space Station crew size, using the seats for expedition crews that would previously have been sold to paying spaceflight participants. Orbital tourist flights were set to resume in 2015 but the planned flight was postponed indefinitely. Russian orbital tourism eventually resumed with the launch of Soyuz MS-20 in 2021.

On 7 June 2019, NASA announced that starting in 2020, the organization aims to start allowing private astronauts to go on the International Space Station, with the use of the SpaceX Crew Dragon spacecraft and the Boeing Starliner spacecraft for public astronauts, which is planned to be priced at 35,000 USD per day for one astronaut, and an estimated 50 million for the ride there and back.

Work also continues towards developing suborbital space tourism vehicles. This is being done by aerospace companies like Blue Origin and Virgin Galactic. SpaceX announced in 2018 that they are planning on sending space tourists, including Yusaku Maezawa, on a free-return trajectory around the Moon on the Starship, however the project was cancelled on 1 June 2024.

== Precursors ==
The Soviet space program was successful in broadening the pool of cosmonauts. The Soviet Intercosmos program included cosmonauts selected from Warsaw Pact member countries (Czechoslovakia, Poland, East Germany, Bulgaria, Hungary, Romania) and later from allies of the USSR (Cuba, Mongolia, Vietnam) and non-aligned countries (India, Syria, Afghanistan). Most of these cosmonauts received full training for their missions and were treated as equals, but were generally given shorter flights than Soviet cosmonauts. The European Space Agency (ESA) also took advantage of the program.

The US Space Shuttle program included payload specialist positions which were usually filled by representatives of companies or institutions managing a specific payload on that mission. These payload specialists did not receive the same training as professional NASA astronauts and were not employed by NASA. In 1983, Ulf Merbold from the ESA and Byron Lichtenberg from MIT (engineer and Air Force fighter pilot) were the first payload specialists to fly on the Space Shuttle, on mission STS-9.

In 1984, Charles D. Walker became the first non-government astronaut to fly, with his employer McDonnell Douglas paying US$40,000 (equivalent to $123,959 in 2025) for his flight. During the 1970s, Shuttle prime contractor Rockwell International studied a $200–300 million removable cabin that could fit into the Shuttle's cargo bay. The cabin could carry up to 74 passengers into orbit for up to three days. Space Habitation Design Associates proposed, in 1983, a cabin for 72 passengers in the bay. Passengers were located in six sections, each with windows and its own loading ramp, and with seats in different configurations for launch and landing. Another proposal was based on the Spacelab habitation modules, which provided 32 seats in the payload bay in addition to those in the cockpit area. A 1985 presentation to the National Space Society stated that, although flying tourists in the cabin would cost $1 million to $1.5 million per passenger without government subsidy, within 15 years, 30,000 people a year would pay US$25,000 (equivalent to $74,838 in 2025) each to fly in space on new spacecraft. The presentation also forecast flights to lunar orbit within 30 years and visits to the lunar surface within 50 years.

As the shuttle program expanded in the early 1980s, NASA began a Space Flight Participant program to allow citizens without scientific or governmental roles to fly. Christa McAuliffe was chosen as the first Teacher in Space in July 1985 from 11,400 applicants. 1,700 applied for the Journalist in Space program. An Artist in Space program was considered, and NASA expected that after McAuliffe's flight two to three civilians a year would fly on the shuttle. After McAuliffe was killed in the Challenger disaster in January 1986, the programs were cancelled. McAuliffe's backup, Barbara Morgan, eventually got hired in 1998 as a professional astronaut and flew on STS-118 as a mission specialist. A second journalist-in-space program, in which NASA green-lighted Miles O'Brien to fly on the Space Shuttle, was scheduled to be announced in 2003. That program was cancelled in the wake of the Columbia disaster on STS-107 and subsequent emphasis on finishing the International Space Station before retiring the Space Shuttle.

Initially, senior figures at NASA strongly opposed space tourism on principle; from the beginning of the ISS expeditions, NASA stated it was not interested in accommodating paying guests. The Subcommittee on Space and Aeronautics Committee on Science of the House of Representatives held in June 2001 revealed the shifting attitude of NASA towards paying space tourists wanting to travel to the ISS in its statement on the hearing's purpose:

"Review the issues and opportunities for flying nonprofessional astronauts in space, the appropriate government role for supporting the nascent space tourism industry, use of the Shuttle and Space Station for Tourism, safety and training criteria for space tourists, and the potential commercial market for space tourism."

The subcommittee report was interested in evaluating Dennis Tito's extensive training and his experience in space as a nonprofessional astronaut.

With the realities of the post-Perestroika economy in Russia, its space industry was especially starved for cash. The Tokyo Broadcasting System (TBS) offered to pay for one of its reporters to fly on a mission. Toyohiro Akiyama was flown in 1990 to Mir with the eighth crew and returned a week later with the seventh crew. Cost estimates vary from $10 million up to $37 million. Akiyama gave a daily TV broadcast from orbit and also performed scientific experiments for Russian and Japanese companies.

In 1991, British chemist Helen Sharman was selected from a pool of 13,000 applicants to be the first Briton in space. The program was known as Project Juno and was a cooperative arrangement between the Soviet Union and a group of British companies. The Project Juno consortium failed to raise the funds required, and the program was almost cancelled. Reportedly Mikhail Gorbachev ordered it to proceed under Soviet expense in the interests of international relations, but in the absence of Western underwriting, less expensive experiments were substituted for those in the original plans. Sharman flew aboard Soyuz TM-12 to Mir and returned aboard Soyuz TM-11.

In April 1999, the Russian space agency announced that 51-year-old British billionaire Peter Llewellyn would be sent to the aging Mir space station in return for a payment of $100 million by Llewellyn. Llewellyn, however, denied agreeing to pay that sum, his refusal to pay which prompted his flight's cancellation a month later.

== Sub-orbital space tourism ==
=== Successful projects ===
- Scaled Composites won the $10 million X Prize in October 2004 with SpaceShipOne, as the first private company to reach and surpass an altitude of 100 km (62 mi) twice within two weeks. The altitude is beyond the Kármán Line, the arbitrarily defined boundary of space. The first flight was flown by Michael Melvill in June 2004, to a height of 100 km (62 mi), making him the first commercial astronaut. The prize-winning flight was flown by Brian Binnie, which reached a height of 112.0 km (69.6 mi), breaking the X-15 record. There were no space tourists on the flights even though the vehicle has seats for three passengers. Instead there was additional weight to make up for the weight of passengers.
- In 2005, Virgin Galactic was founded as a joint venture between Scaled Composites and Richard Branson's Virgin Group. Eventually Virgin Group owned the entire project. Virgin Galactic began building SpaceShipTwo-class spaceplanes. The first of these spaceplanes, VSS Enterprise, was intended to commence its first commercial flights in 2015, and tickets were on sale at a price of $200,000 (later raised to $250,000). However, the company suffered a considerable setback when the Enterprise broke up over the Mojave Desert during a test flight in October 2014. Over 700 tickets had been sold prior to the accident. A second spaceplane, VSS Unity, completed a successful test flight with four passengers on July 11, 2021, to an altitude of nearly 90 km (56 mi). Galactic 01 became the company's first commercial spaceflight on June 29, 2023.
- Blue Origin developed the New Shepard reusable suborbital launch system specifically to enable short-duration space tourism. Blue Origin plans to ferry a maximum of six persons on a brief journey to space on board the New Shepard. The capsule is attached to the top portion of an 18-meter (59-foot) rocket. The rocket successfully launched with four passengers on July 20, 2021, and reached an altitude of 107 km (66 mi). Blue Origin's 10th human flight lifted off on the morning of February 25, 2025. Six paying passengers, including a Spanish TV host, and several investors, experienced weightlessness during the 10-12-minute flight and can see Earth against the blackness of space.

=== Cancelled projects ===
- Armadillo Aerospace was developing a two-seat vertical takeoff and landing (VTOL) rocket called Hyperion, which will be marketed by Space Adventures. Hyperion uses a capsule similar in shape to the Gemini capsule. The vehicle will use a parachute for descent but will probably use retrorockets for final touchdown, according to remarks made by Armadillo Aerospace at the Next Generation Suborbital Researchers Conference in February 2012. The assets of Armadillo Aerospace were sold to Exos Aerospace and while SARGE is continuing to be developed, it is unclear whether Hyperion is still being developed.
- XCOR Aerospace was developing a suborbital vehicle called Lynx until development was halted in May 2016. The Lynx would take off from a runway under rocket power. Unlike SpaceShipOne and SpaceShipTwo, Lynx would not require a mothership. Lynx was designed for rapid turnaround, which would enable it to fly up to four times per day. Because of this rapid flight rate, Lynx had fewer seats than SpaceShipTwo, carrying only one pilot and one spaceflight participant on each flight. XCOR expected to roll out the first Lynx prototype and begin flight tests in 2015, but as of late 2017, XCOR was unable to complete their prototype development and filed for bankruptcy.
  - Citizens in Space, formerly the Teacher in Space Project, is a project of the United States Rocket Academy. Citizens in Space combines citizen science with citizen space exploration. The goal is to fly citizen-science experiments and citizen explorers (who travel free) who will act as payload operators on suborbital space missions. By 2012, Citizens in Space had acquired a contract for 10 suborbital flights with XCOR Aerospace and expected to acquire additional flights from XCOR and other suborbital spaceflight providers in the future. In 2012, Citizens in Space reported they had begun training three citizen astronaut candidates and would select seven additional candidates over the next 12 to 14 months.
  - Space Expedition Corporation was preparing to use the Lynx for "Space Expedition Curaçao", a commercial flight from Hato Airport on Curaçao, and planned to start commercial flights in 2014. The costs were $95,000 each.
  - Axe Apollo Space Academy promotion by Unilever which planned to provide 23 people suborbital spaceflights on board the Lynx.
- EADS Astrium, a subsidiary of European aerospace giant EADS, announced its space tourism project in June 2007.

== Orbital space tourism ==
As of 2021, Space Adventures and SpaceX are the only companies to have coordinated tourism flights to Earth's orbit. Virginia-based Space Adventures has worked with Russia to use its Soyuz spacecraft to fly ultra-wealthy individuals to the International Space Station. The tourists included entrepreneur and space investor Anousheh Ansari and Cirque du Soleil co-founder Guy Laliberté. Those missions were priced at around $20 million each. The space industry could soon be headed for a tourism revolution if SpaceX and Boeing make good on their plans to take tourists to orbit.

=== Successful projects ===
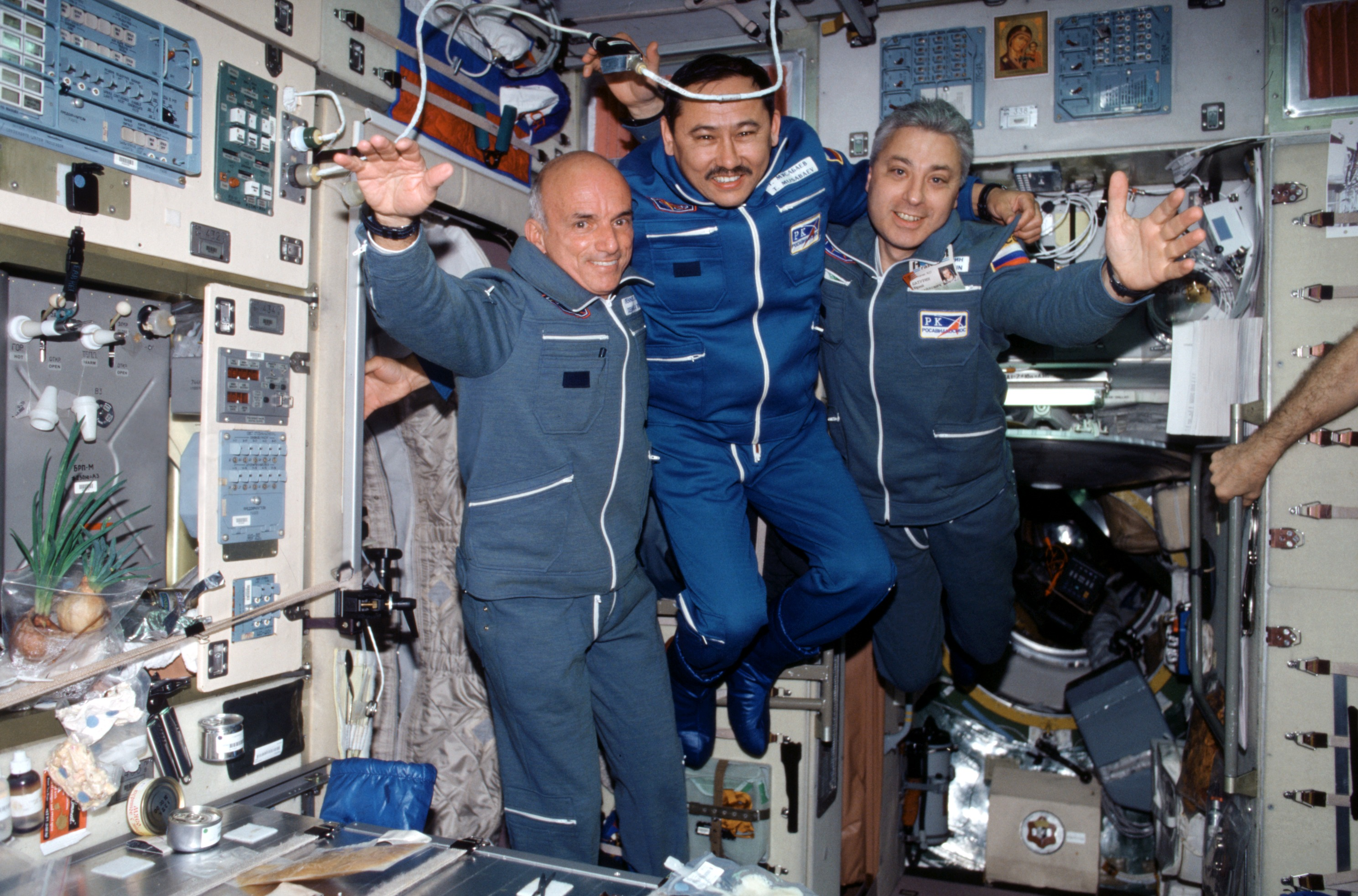
The first space tourist, Dennis Tito (left) aboard the ISS

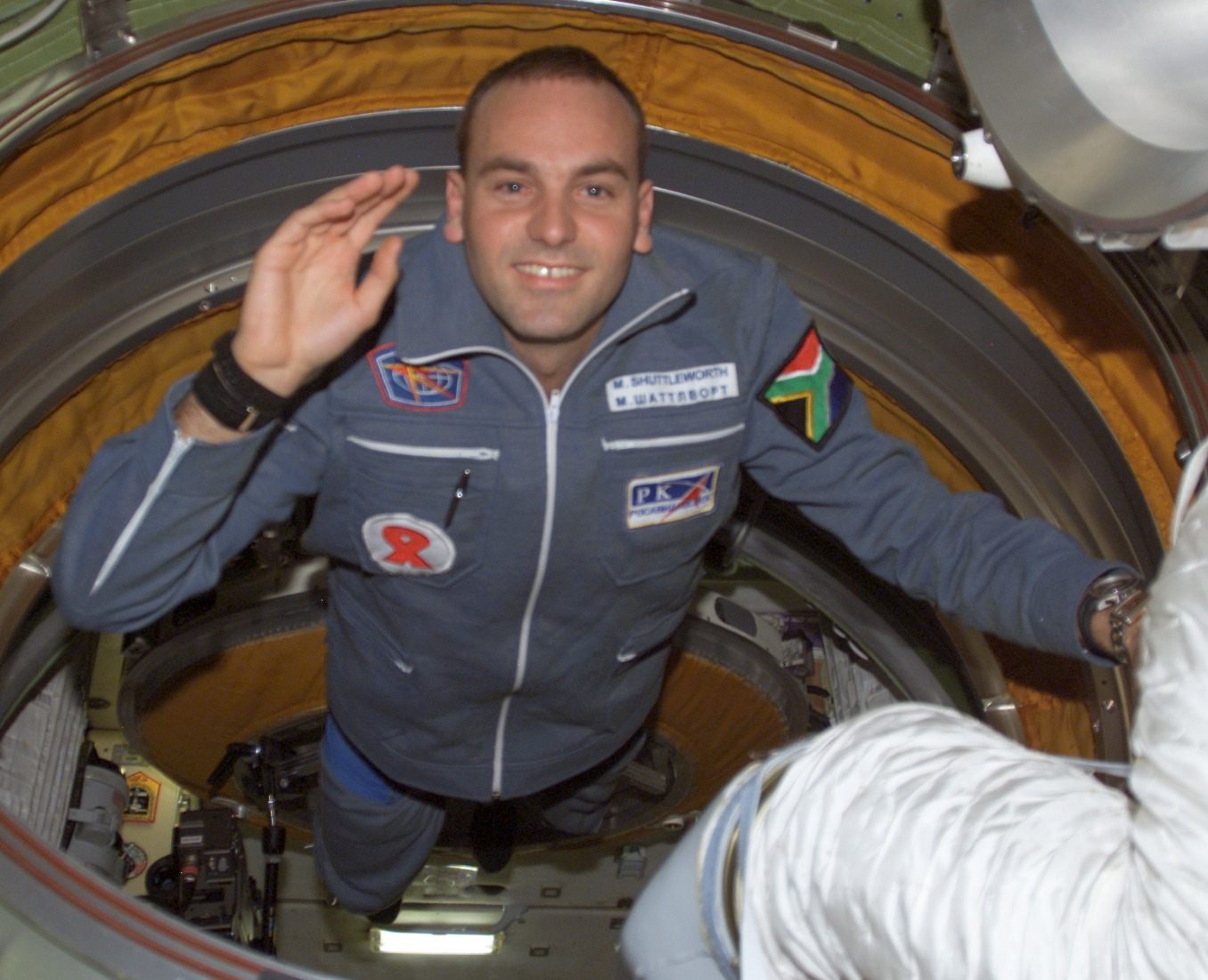
Space tourist Mark Shuttleworth

At the end of the 1990s, MirCorp, a private venture that was by then in charge of the space station, began seeking potential space tourists to visit Mir in order to offset some of its maintenance costs. Dennis Tito, an American businessman and former JPL scientist, became their first candidate. When the decision was made to de-orbit Mir, Tito managed to switch his trip to the International Space Station (ISS) aboard a Russian Soyuz spacecraft through a deal between MirCorp and US-based Space Adventures, Ltd. Dennis Tito visited the ISS for seven days in April–May 2001, becoming the world's first "fee-paying" space tourist. Tito paid a reported $20 million for his trip.

Tito was followed in April 2002 by South African Mark Shuttleworth (Soyuz TM-34). In February 2003, the Space Shuttle Columbia disintegrated on re-entry into the Earth's atmosphere, killing all seven astronauts aboard. After this disaster, space tourism on the Russian Soyuz program was temporarily put on hold, because Soyuz vehicles became the only available transport to the ISS. After the Shuttle's return to service in July 2005, space tourism was resumed. The third was Gregory Olsen in October 2005 (Soyuz TMA-7). In September 2006, an Iranian American businesswoman named Anousheh Ansari became the fourth space tourist (Soyuz TMA-9).) In April 2007, Charles Simonyi, an American businessman of Hungarian descent, joined their ranks (Soyuz TMA-10). Simonyi became the first repeat space tourist, paying again to fly on Soyuz TMA-14 in March 2009. British-American Richard Garriott became the next space tourist in October 2008 aboard Soyuz TMA-13. Canadian Guy Laliberté visited the ISS in September 2009 aboard Soyuz TMA-16, becoming the last visiting tourist until Japanese nationals Yusaku Maezawa and Yozo Hirano aboard Soyuz MS-20 in December 2021. Originally the third member aboard Soyuz TMA-18M would have been the British singer Sarah Brightman as a space tourist, but on May 13, 2015, she announced she had withdrawn from training.

Since the Space Shuttle was retired in 2011, Soyuz once again became the only means of accessing the ISS, and so tourism was once again put on hold. On June 7, 2019, NASA announced a plan to open the ISS to space tourism again.

On September 16, 2021, the Inspiration4 mission launched from the Kennedy Space Center on a SpaceX Falcon 9 and spent almost three days in orbit aboard the Crew Dragon Resilience, becoming the first all-civilian crew to fly an orbital space mission.

On September 12, 2024, Jared Isaacman and Sarah Gillis performed the first commercial spacewalk during the Polaris Dawn spaceflight operated by SpaceX.

On April 1, 2025, Fram2 became the first crewed spaceflight to enter a polar retrograde orbit, launched on a SpaceX Falcon 9 rocket.

=== Ongoing projects ===
- Axiom Space uses Crew Dragon flights contracted with SpaceX to send crews to the International Space Station. Mission 1 flew in April 2022, Mission 2 in May 2023, Mission 3 in January 2024, and Mission 4 in June 2025. Through these missions, NASA hopes to create a non-NASA market for human spaceflight to enable cost-sharing on future commercial space stations.
- The Boeing Starliner capsule is being developed as part of the NASA's Commercial Crew Program. Part of the agreement with NASA allows Boeing to sell seats for space tourists. Boeing proposed including one seat per flight for a spaceflight participant at a price that would be competitive with what Roscosmos charges tourists.
- The Polaris Program: The commander and financier of the Inspiration4 mission, Jared Isaacman, announced plans for a three-mission program called Polaris in February 2022. The first mission, Polaris Dawn, launched four private astronauts in a Crew Dragon spacecraft to earth orbit. Polaris Dawn was a free-flyer mission in which the spacecraft did not perform any rendezvous maneuvers, instead setting the all-time earth orbit altitude record at 1,400 km, surpassing the 1,373 km record set by Gemini XI. Polaris Dawn also included the first private extravehicular activity (EVA). The last Polaris program mission is planned to be the first crewed flight of the in-development Starship launch system.

=== Cancelled projects ===
- In 2004, Bigelow Aerospace established a competition called America's Space Prize, which offered a $50 million prize to the first US company to create a reusable spacecraft capable of carrying passengers to a Nautilus space station. The prize expired in January 2010 without anyone making a serious effort to win it.
- The Space Island Group proposed having 20,000 people on their "space island" by 2020.
- A United States startup firm, Orion Span announced during the early part of 2018 that it planned to launch and position a luxury space hotel in orbit within several years. Aurora Space Station, the name of the hotel, would have offered guests (at most six individuals) 12 days of staying in a pill-shaped space hotel for $9.5 million. The hotel's cabins would have measured approximately 12.9 metres (43 feet) by 4.8 metres (14 feet) in width.
- Space Adventures Crew Dragon mission: Space Adventures and SpaceX planned to send up to four tourists to low Earth orbit for a few days in late 2021 or early 2022. In October 2021, Space Adventures stated that the mission contract had expired, though the possibility of a future partnership with SpaceX was left open.
- Galactic Suite Design
- Orbital Technologies Commercial Space Station
- Space Industries Incorporated
- Space Islands

== Tourism beyond Earth orbit ==
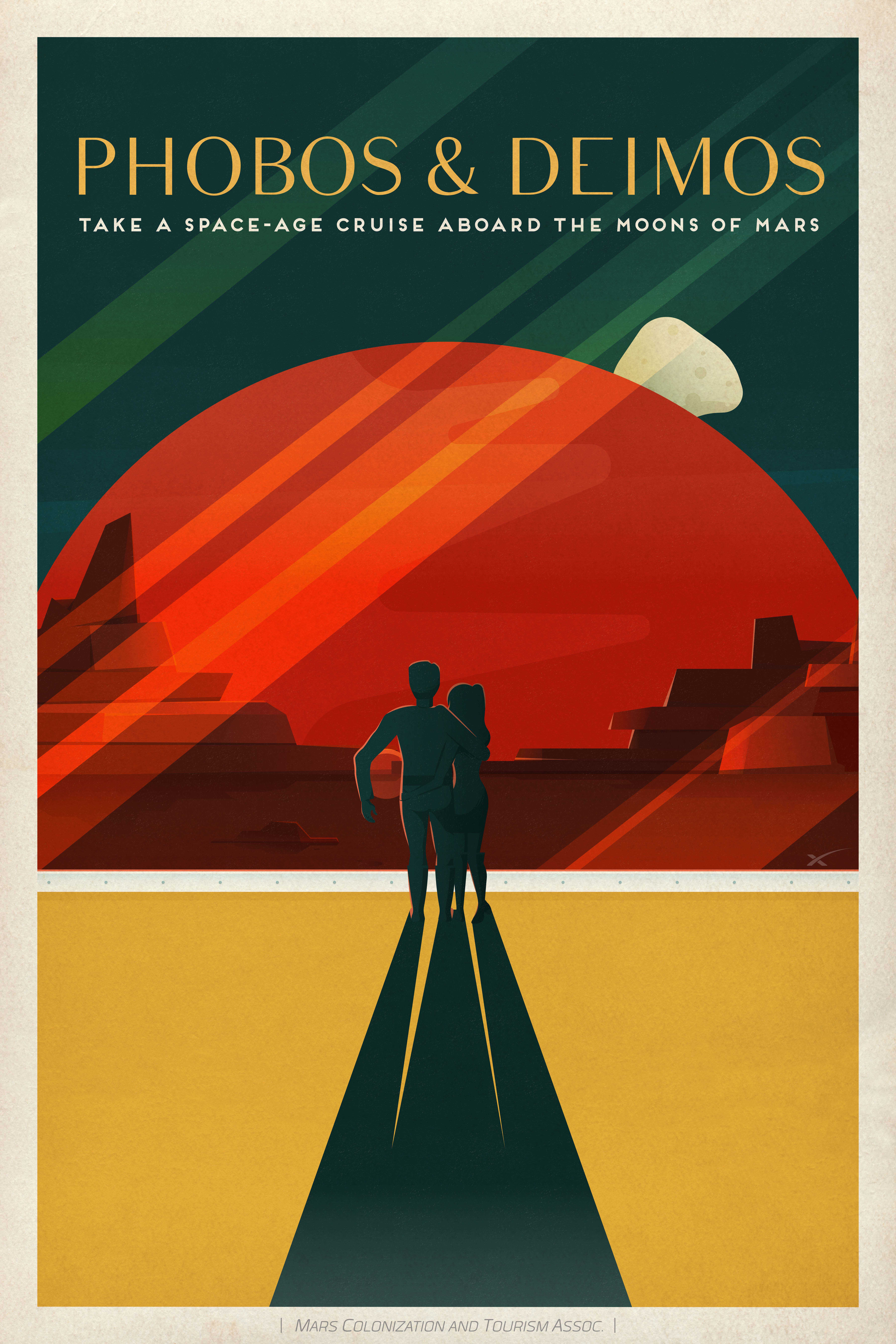
Artist conception of a Mars tourism poster, made by SpaceX

=== Ongoing projects ===
- A mission with a similar flight profile is planned to have the same flight profile as the now cancelled Dearmoon project, with Dennis Tito and his wife Akiko Tito as two of the passengers.
- Space Adventures Ltd. have announced that they are working on DSE-Alpha, a circumlunar mission to the Moon, with the price per passenger being $100,000,000.

=== Cancelled projects ===
- Excalibur Almaz proposed to take three tourists in a flyby around the Moon, using modified Almaz space station modules, in a low-energy trajectory flyby around the Moon. The trip would last around 6 months. However, their equipment was never launched and is to be converted into an educational exhibit.
- The Golden Spike Company was an American space transport startup active from 2010 to 2013. The company held the objective to offer private commercial space transportation services to the surface of the Moon. The company's website was quietly taken offline in September 2015.
- The Inspiration Mars Foundation is an American nonprofit organization founded by Dennis Tito that proposed to launch a crewed mission to flyby Mars in January 2018, or 2021 if they missed the first deadline. Their website became defunct by late 2015 but it is archived by the Internet Archive. The Foundation's future plans are unclear.
- Bigelow Aerospace planned to extend their successes with the Genesis modules by launching the B330, an expandable habitation module with 330 cubic meters of internal space, aboard a Vulcan rocket. The Vulcan was contracted to boost BA 330 to low lunar orbit by the end of 2022.
- In February 2017, Elon Musk announced that substantial deposits from two individuals had been received by SpaceX for a Moon loop flight using a free return trajectory and that this could happen as soon as late 2018. Musk said that the cost of the mission would be "comparable" to that of sending an astronaut to the International Space Station, about US$70 million in 2017. In February 2018, Musk announced that the Falcon Heavy rocket would not be used for crewed missions. The proposal changed in 2018 to use the Starship launch system instead. In September 2018, Musk revealed the passenger for the trip, Yusaku Maezawa during a livestream. Yusaku Maezawa described the plan for his trip in further detail, dubbed the #dearMoon project, intended to take 6–8 artists with him on the journey to inspire the artists to create new art.

== Legality ==
Under the Outer Space Treaty signed in 1967, the launch operator's nationality and the launch site's location determine which country is responsible for any damages occurred from a launch.

After valuable resources were detected on the Moon, private companies began to formulate methods to extract the resources. Article II of the Outer Space Treaty dictates that "outer space, including the Moon and other celestial bodies, is not subject to national appropriation by claim of sovereignty, by means of use or occupation, or by any other means". However, countries have the right to freely explore the Moon and any resources collected for scientific purposes are property of that country when they return.

=== United States ===
In December 2005, the US government released a set of proposed rules for space tourism. The proposed rules required informed consent and emergency-response training for space flight participants; physical examinations were recommended but not required unless a clear public-safety need was identified.

In 1984, the U.S. Congress passed the Commercial Space Launch Act, which, among other things, encourages space commercialization (51 U.S.C. § 20102(c)).

Under current US law, any company proposing to launch paying passengers from American soil on a suborbital rocket must receive a license from the Federal Aviation Administration's Office of Commercial Space Transportation (FAA/AST). The licensing process focuses on public safety and safety of property, and the details can be found in the Code of Federal Regulations, Title 14, Chapter III. This is in accordance with the Commercial Space Launch Amendments Act passed by Congress in 2004, which required that NASA and the Federal Aviation Administration to allow paying passengers fly on suborbital launch vehicles at their own risk.

In March 2010, the New Mexico legislature passed the Spaceflight Informed Consent Act. The SICA gives legal protection to companies who provide private space flights in the case of accidental harm or death to individuals. Participants sign an Informed Consent waiver, dictating that spaceflight operators cannot be held liable in the "death of a participant resulting from the inherent risks of space flight activities". Operators are however not covered in the case of gross negligence or willful misconduct.

In December 2021, the FAA announced that starting in 2022, it would recognize on its official website those who travel to space. "Any individual who is on an FAA-licensed or permitted launch and reaches 50 statute miles above the surface of the Earth will be listed on the site." The announcement ended the Commercial Space Astronaut Wings program, under which the FAA had offered commercial astronaut wings to individuals on private spacecraft who made it above 50 miles (80 kilometers) in altitude above Earth since 2004.

=== Legal issues and challenges ===
With the increasing advent of sub-orbital flights, there are growing concerns that the present international framework is insufficient to address the significant issues raised by space tourism. The concerns relate to commercial Liability, insurance, consumer protection, passenger safety, environmental impact, and emergency response.

== List of space tourism trips ==
The following list notes each trip taken by an individual for whom a fee was paid (by themselves or another party) to go above the Kármán Line, the internationally recognized boundary of space at 100 km, or above the US definition of the boundary of space at 50 miles (80 km). It also includes future trips which are paid for and scheduled.

=== Suborbital ===
Flight up (craft)	Flight down (craft)	Duration	Mission	Tourist(s)	Destination	Fee paid	Tour company	Ref.
20 July 2021 (RSS First Step)	20 July 2021 (RSS First Step)	10 minutes	NS-16	(United States) Jeff Bezos; (United States) Mark Bezos; (Netherlands) Oliver Daemen; (United States) Wally Funk	Sub-orbital spaceflight (Kármán line)		Blue Origin	
13 October 2021 (RSS First Step)	13 October 2021 (RSS First Step)	10 minutes	NS-18	(Canada) William Shatner; (Australia) Chris Boshuizen; (United States) Audrey Powers; (United States) Glen de Vries	Sub-orbital spaceflight (Kármán line)		Blue Origin	
11 December 2021 (RSS First Step)	11 December 2021 (RSS First Step)	10 minutes	NS-19	(United States) Lane Bess; (United States) Cameron Bess; (United States) Evan Dick; (United States) Laura Shepard Churchley; (United States) Michael Strahan; (United States) Dylan Taylor	Sub-orbital spaceflight (Kármán line)		Blue Origin	
31 March 2022 (RSS First Step)	31 March 2022 (RSS First Step)	10 minutes	NS-20	(United States) Marty Allen; (United States) Sharon Hagle; (United States) Marc Hagle; (United States) Jim Kitchen; (United States) George Nield; (United States) Gary Lai	Sub-orbital spaceflight (Kármán line)		Blue Origin	
4 June 2022 (RSS First Step)	4 June 2022 (RSS First Step)	10 minutes	NS-21	(United States) Evan Dick; (United States) Katya Echazarreta; (United Kingdom) Hamish Harding; (Brazil) Victor Correa Hespanha; (United States) Jaison Robinson; (United States) Victor Vescovo	Sub-orbital spaceflight (Kármán line)		Blue Origin	
4 August 2022 (RSS First Step)	4 August 2022 (RSS First Step)	10 minutes	NS-22	(United States) Coby Cotton; (Portugal) Mário Ferreira; (United States) Vanessa O'Brien; (United States) Clint Kelly III; (Egypt) Sara Sabry; (United States) Steve Young	Sub-orbital spaceflight (Kármán line)		Blue Origin	
19 May 2024 (RSS First Step)	19 May 2024 (RSS First Step)	9 minutes, 53 seconds	NS-25	(United States) Mason Angel (France) Sylvain Chiron (United States) Ed Dwight (United States) Carol Schaller (United States) Kenneth Hess (India) Thotakura Gopichand	Sub-orbital spaceflight (Kármán line)		Blue Origin	
29 August 2024 (RSS First Step)	29 August 2024 (RSS First Step)	10 minutes, 8 seconds	NS-26	(United Kingdom) / (Singapore) Nicolina Elrick (United States) Karsen Kitchen (United States) Rob Ferl (Ukraine) Eugene Grin (Iran) / (United States) Eiman Jahangir (United States) / (Israel) Ephraim Rabin	Sub-orbital spaceflight (Kármán line)		Blue Origin	
22 November 2024 (RSS First Step)	22 November 2024 (RSS First Step)	10 minutes, 14 seconds	NS-28	(United States) James (J.D.) Russell (United States) Emily Calandrelli (United States) Austin Litteral (United States) Marc Hagle (2) (United States) Sharon Hagle (2) (Canada) Henry (Hank) Wolfond	Sub-orbital spaceflight (Kármán line)		Blue Origin	
25 February 2025 (RSS First Step)	25 February 2025 (RSS First Step)	10 minutes, 8 seconds	NS-30	(United States) Lane Bess (2) (Spain) Jesús Calleja (United States) Dr. Richard Scott (United States) Tushar Shah (Australia) Elaine Chia Hyde (Australia) Robert Wilson	Sub-orbital spaceflight (Kármán line)		Blue Origin	
14 April 2025 (RSS Karman Line)	14 April 2025 (RSS Karman Line)	10 minutes, 21 seconds	NS-31	(United States) / (The Bahamas) Aisha Bowe (United States) Amanda Nguyen (United States) Gayle King (United States) Kerianne Flynn (United States) Katy Perry (United States) Lauren Sánchez	Sub-orbital spaceflight (Kármán line)		Blue Origin	
31 May 2025 (RSS First Step)	31 May 2025 (RSS First Step)	10 minutes, 7 seconds	NS-32	(New Zealand) Mark Rocket (Panama) Jaime Alemán (Puerto Rico) Aymette (Amy) Medina Jorge (United States) Dr. Gretchen Green (Canada) Jesse Williams (United States) Paul Jeris	Sub-orbital spaceflight (Kármán line)		Blue Origin	
29 June 2025 (RSS Karman Line)	29 June 2025 (RSS Karman Line)	10 minutes, 14 seconds	NS-33	(United States) Allie Kuehner; (United States) Carl Kuehner; (United States) Leland Larson; (United States) Freddie Rescigno, Jr.; (Nigeria) Owolabi Salis; (United States) James (Jim) Sitkin	Sub-orbital spaceflight (Kármán line)		Blue Origin	
3 August 2025 (RSS First Step)	3 August 2025 (RSS First Step)	10 minutes, 7 seconds	NS-34	(United Kingdom) Lionel Pitchford (Saint Kitts and Nevis) H.E. Justin Sun (Puerto Rico) Deborah Martorell (United States) James (J.D.) Russell (Turkey) Gökhan Erdem (United States) Arvinder (Arvi) Singh Bahal	Sub-orbital spaceflight (Kármán line)		Blue Origin	
8 October 2025 (RSS First Step)	10 October 2025 (RSS First Step)	10 minutes, 21 seconds	NS-36	(United States) Clint Kelly III (United States) Aaron Newman (United States) Jeff Elgin (Ukraine) Vitalii Ostrovsky (Kazakhstan) Danna Karagussova (United States) William H. Lewis	Sub-orbital spaceflight (Kármán line)		Blue Origin	

=== Orbital ===
Flight up (craft)	Flight down (craft)	Duration	Mission	Tourist(s)	Destination	Fee paid	Tour company	Ref.
28 April 2001 (Soyuz TM-32)	6 May 2001 (Soyuz TM-31)	8 days	ISS EP-1	(United States) Dennis Tito	International Space Station	US$20 million	Space Adventures	
25 April 2002 (Soyuz TM-34)	5 May 2002 (Soyuz TM-33)	10 days	ISS EP-2	(South Africa) Mark Shuttleworth	International Space Station	US$20 million	Space Adventures	
1 October 2005 (Soyuz TMA-7)	10 October 2005 (Soyuz TMA-6)	10 days	ISS EP-3	(United States) Gregory Olsen	International Space Station	US$20 million	Space Adventures	
20 September 2006 (Soyuz TMA-9)	29 September 2006 (Soyuz TMA-8)	10 days	ISS EP-4	(Iran) / (United States) Anousheh Ansari	International Space Station	US$20 million	Space Adventures	
7 April 2007 (Soyuz TMA-10)	21 April 2007 (Soyuz TMA-9)	10 days	ISS EP-12	(Hungary) / (United States) Charles Simonyi	International Space Station	US$25 million	Space Adventures	
12 October 2008 (Soyuz TMA-13)	24 October 2008 (Soyuz TMA-12)	13 days	ISS EP-13	(United Kingdom) / (United States) Richard Garriott	International Space Station	US$30 million	Space Adventures	
26 March 2009 (Soyuz TMA-14)	8 April 2009 (Soyuz TMA-13)	14 days	ISS EP-14	(Hungary) / (United States) Charles Simonyi	International Space Station	US$35 million	Space Adventures	
30 September 2009 (Soyuz TMA-16)	11 October 2009 (Soyuz TMA-14)	12 days	ISS EP-15	(Canada) Guy Laliberté	International Space Station	US$35 million	Space Adventures	
16 September 2021 (Crew Dragon Resilience)	19 September 2021 (Crew Dragon Resilience)	3 days	Inspiration4	(United States) Jared Isaacman; (United States) Sian Proctor; (United States) Hayley Arceneaux; (United States) Christopher Sembroski	Low Earth Orbit		SpaceX	
8 December 2021 (Soyuz MS-20)	20 December 2021 (Soyuz MS-20)	12 days	ISS EP-20	(Japan) Yusaku Maezawa; (Japan) Yozo Hirano	International Space Station		Space Adventures	
8 April 2022 (Crew Dragon Endeavour)	25 April 2022 (Crew Dragon Endeavour)	17 days	Ax-1	(Israel) Eytan Stibbe; (United States) Larry Connor; (Canada) Mark Pathy	International Space Station	US$55 million each	Axiom Space	
21 May 2023 (Crew Dragon Freedom)	31 May 2023 (Crew Dragon Freedom)	10 days	Ax-2	(United States) John Shoffner	International Space Station		Axiom Space	
1 April 2025 (Crew Dragon Resilience)	4 April 2025 (Crew Dragon Resilience)	4 days	Fram2	(Malta) / (Saint Kitts and Nevis) (Note: Wang was born in China but lives primarily in Svalbard and since 2023 is also a citizen of Malta and Saint Kitts and Nevis through their golden visa programs. He will wear the flag of Malta on his spacesuit during the spaceflight.) Chun Wang; (Norway) / (United Kingdom) (Note: Mikkelsen was born in the United Kingdom, but is now a citizen of Norway. She will wear the flag of Norway on her spacesuit during the spaceflight.) Jannicke Mikkelsen; (Australia) Eric Philips; (Germany) Rabea Rogge	Polar LEO (Retrograde)		SpaceX	

== Criticism of the term space tourist ==
Many private space travelers have objected to the term space tourist, often pointing out that their role went beyond that of an observer, since they also carried out scientific experiments in the course of their journey. Richard Garriott additionally emphasized that his training was identical to the requirements of non-Russian Soyuz crew members, and that teachers and other non-professional astronauts chosen to fly with NASA are called astronauts. He has said that if the distinction has to be made, he would rather be called "private astronaut" than "tourist". Mark Shuttleworth described himself as a "pioneer of commercial space travel". Gregory Olsen prefers "private researcher", and Anousheh Ansari prefers the term "private space explorer". Other advocates of private spaceflight object to the term on similar grounds. Rick Tumlinson of the Space Frontier Foundation, for example, has said: "I hate the word tourist, and I always will ... 'Tourist' is somebody in a flowered shirt with three cameras around his neck." Russian cosmonaut Maksim Surayev told the press in 2009 not to describe Guy Laliberté as a tourist: "It's become fashionable to speak of space tourists. He is not a tourist but a participant in the mission."

"Spaceflight participant" is the official term used by NASA and the Russian Federal Space Agency to distinguish between private space travelers and career astronauts. Tito, Shuttleworth, Olsen, Ansari, and Simonyi were designated as such during their respective space flights. NASA also lists Christa McAuliffe as a spaceflight participant (although she did not pay a fee), apparently due to her non-technical duties aboard the STS-51-L flight.

The US Federal Aviation Administration awards the title of "commercial astronaut" to trained crew members of privately funded spacecraft.

== Attitudes towards space tourism ==
A 2018 survey from the PEW Research Center identifies the top three motivations for a customer to purchase a flight into space as:

- To experience something unique ( e.g. pioneering, one of a kind)
- To see the view of Earth from space
- To learn more about the world

The PEW study also found that only 43% of Americans would be definitely or probably interested in going into space. NASA astronaut Megan McArthur has a message to space tourists: spaceflight is uncomfortable and risky, and takes grit.

A web-based survey suggested that over 70% of those surveyed wanted less than or equal to two weeks in space; in addition, 88% wanted to spacewalk, of whom 14% would pay a 50% premium for the experience, and 21% wanted a hotel or space station.

The concept has met with some criticism; Günter Verheugen, vice-president of the European Commission, said of the EADS Astrium Space Tourism Project: "It's only for the super-rich, which is against my social convictions".

On October 14, 2021, Prince William suggested that entrepreneurs should focus on saving Earth rather than engaging in space tourism and also warned about a rise in "climate anxiety" among younger generations.

=== Environmental effects ===
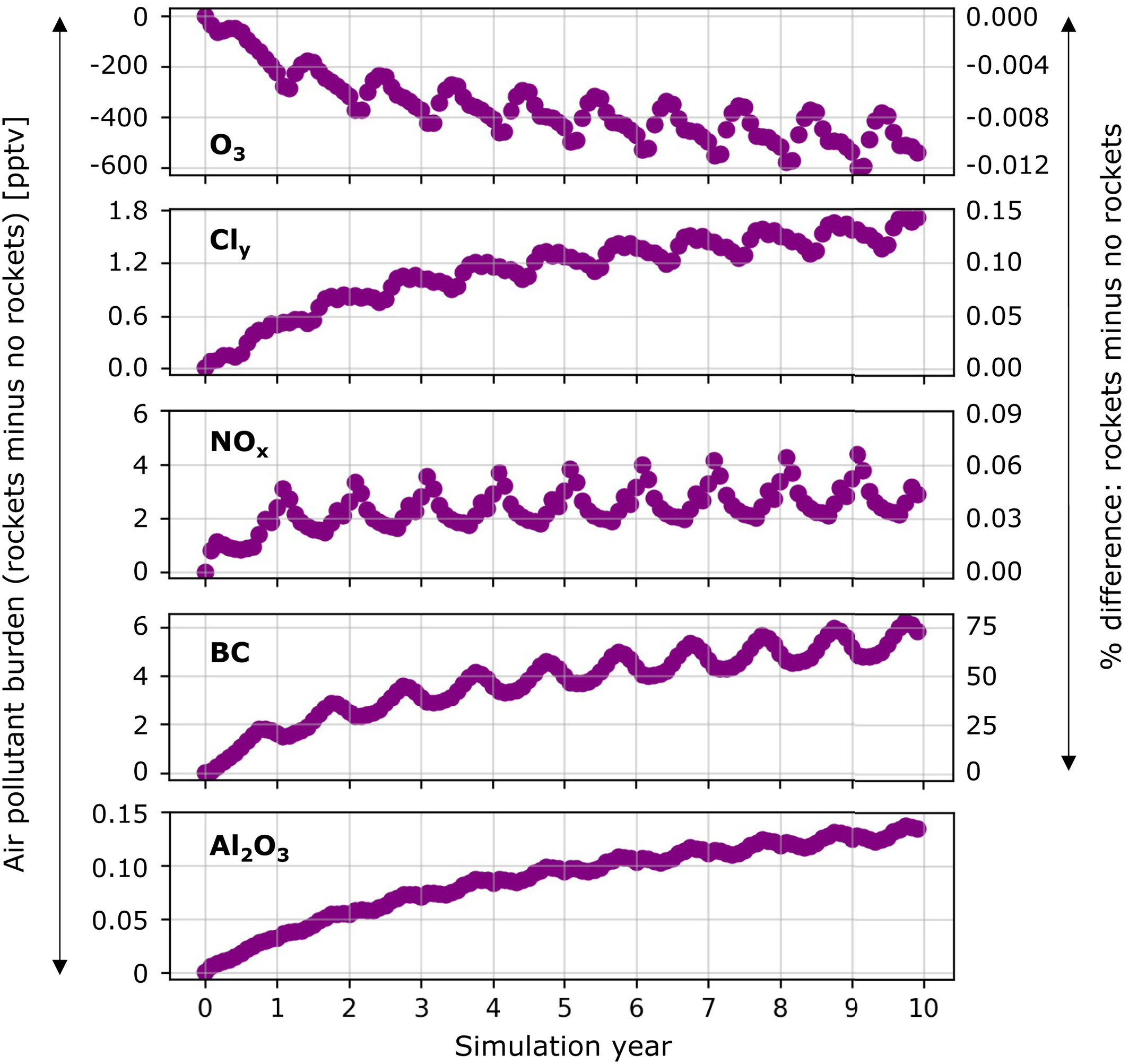
Influence of a decade of contemporary rocket launch and re-entry heating emissions on stratospheric chemical composition

A 2010 study published in Geophysical Research Letters raised concerns that the growing commercial spaceflight industry could accelerate global warming. The study, funded by NASA and The Aerospace Corporation, simulated the impact of 1,000 suborbital launches of hybrid rockets from a single location, calculating that this would release a total of 600 tonnes of black carbon into the stratosphere. They found that the resultant layer of soot particles remained relatively localized, with only 20% of the carbon straying into the southern hemisphere, thus creating a strong hemispherical asymmetry. This unbalance would cause the temperature to decrease by about 0.4 °C (0.72 °F) in the tropics and subtropics, whereas the temperature at the poles would increase by between 0.2 and 1 °C (0.36 and 1.80 °F). The ozone layer would also be affected, with the tropics losing up to 1.7% of ozone cover, and the polar regions gaining 5–6%. The researchers stressed that these results should not be taken as "a precise forecast of the climate response to a specific launch rate of a specific rocket type", but as a demonstration of the sensitivity of the atmosphere to the large-scale disruption that commercial space tourism could bring.

A 2022 study estimated the air pollution impacts on climate change and the ozone layer from rocket launches and re-entry of reusable components and debris in 2019 and from a theoretical future space industry extrapolated from the "billionaire space race". It concludes that substantial effects from routine space tourism should "motivate regulation".

=== Education and advocacy ===
Several organizations have been formed to promote the space tourism industry, including the Space Tourism Society, Space Future, and HobbySpace. UniGalactic Space Travel Magazine is a bi-monthly educational publication covering space tourism and space exploration developments in companies like SpaceX, Orbital Sciences, Virgin Galactic and organizations like NASA.

Classes in space tourism have been taught at the Rochester Institute of Technology in New York, and Keio University in Japan. Embry-Riddle Aeronautical University in Florida launched a worldwide space tourism course in 2017.

=== Economic potential ===
A 2010 report from the Federal Aviation Administration, titled "The Economic Impact of Commercial Space Transportation on the U.S. Economy in 2009", cites studies done by Futron, an aerospace and technology-consulting firm, which predict that space tourism could become a billion-dollar market within 20 years. Eight tourists reached orbit between 2001 and 2009. In 2011 Space Adventures suggested that this number could reach 140 by 2020, but with commercial crewed rockets only just beginning to enter service, such numbers have yet to be achieved.

According to a 2022 report by Research and Markets, titled "Global Space Tourism Market," the global space tourism industry is projected to reach US$8.67 billion by 2030, with an estimated compound annual growth rate (CAGR) of 37.1% between 2022 and 2030.

== See also ==
- Commercialization of space
- Effect of spaceflight on the human body
- Private spaceflight
- Commercial astronaut, a 2004-2021 FAA program designation for early space tourists
- Spaceflight participant, the official term used by NASA, Roscosmos and the FAA for non-astronauts/non-cosmonauts such as space tourists
- Sub-orbital spaceflight
