= Panorays =

SaaS platform

- Company type: Private
- Industry: Technology, IT risk management
- Founded: 2016
- Founders: Matan Or-El, Meir Antar, Demi Ben-Ari
- Headquarters: New York City, United States
- Area served: Global
- Website: www.panorays.com

Panorays is a SaaS-based, third-party security risk management platform. It was founded in 2016 and is headquartered in New York, United States.

== History ==
Matan Or-El, Meir Antar, and Demi Ben-Ari, created Panorays in 2016 as an automated third-party security risk management platform. In June 2018, Panorays received a $5 million funding round, led by Aleph venture capital. In December 2019, Panorays received $15 million in Series A funding, led by Oak HC/FT and former Palo Alto Networks chief executive officer, Lane Bess.

== Technology ==
The Panorays platform gives visibility into and control over third-party security risk through a three-pronged approach to risk assessment - automated vendor questionnaires, assessment of a third-party's external attack surface, and the nature and criticality of the business relationship. The platform also checks vendor compliance with multiple regulations, including the European Union’s General Data Protection Regulation (GDPR), California Consumer Privacy Act (CCPA), New York State Department of Financial Services (NYDFS), and automates the Standardized Information Gathering (SIG) and Consensus Assessments Initiative Questionnaires (CAIQ). It continuously monitors and evaluates third-party security risk, helping companies ensure their vendors are in alignment with their security policies, regulations, and risk appetite.
