= Dylan Taylor (executive) =

American businessman

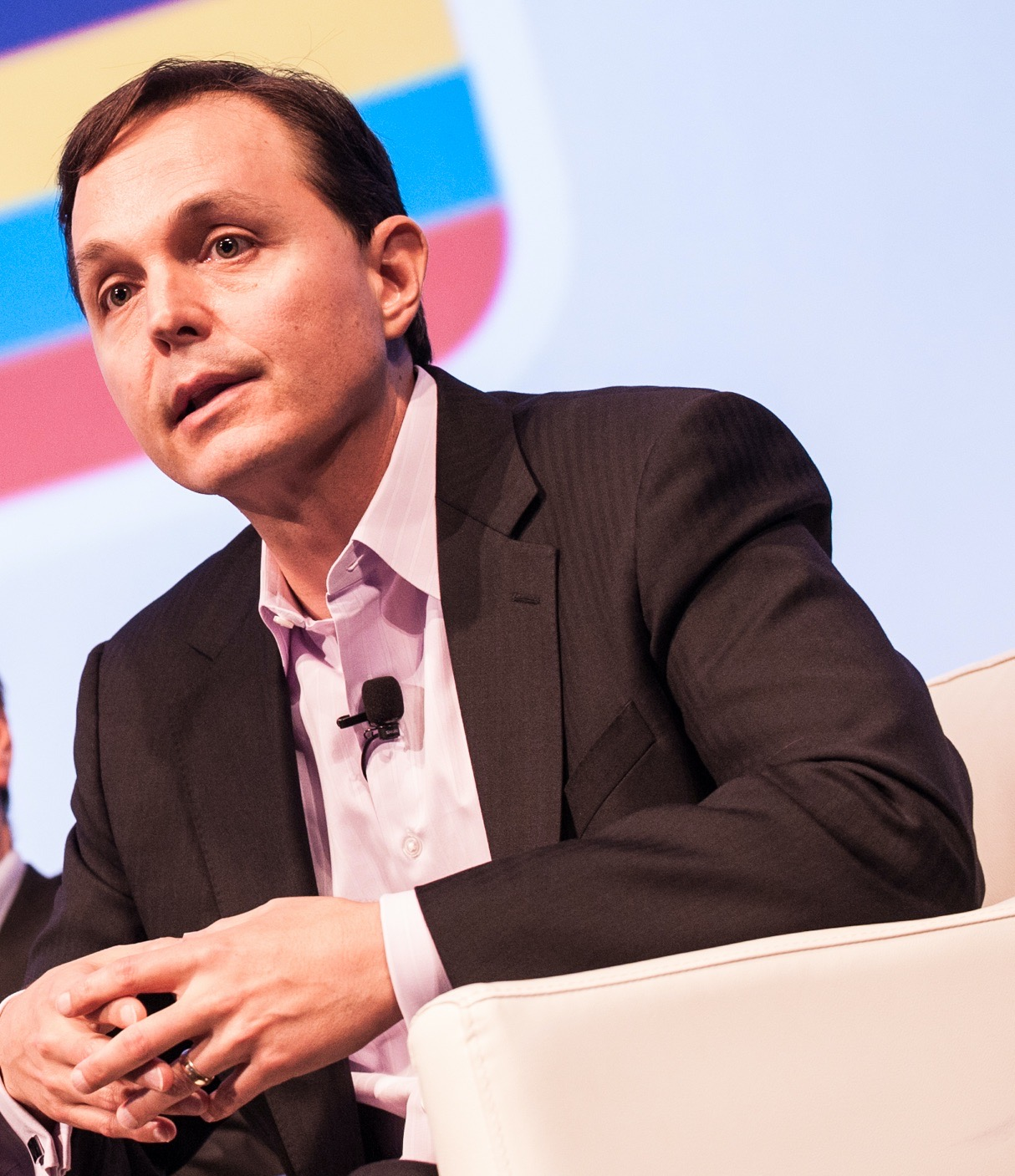
- Taylor in 2018
- Born: October 23, 1970 (age 55); Denver, Colorado, U.S.
- Education: University of Arizona; University of Chicago
- Occupation: Executive
- Website: www.dylantaylor.org

Dylan Taylor (born October 23, 1970) is an American executive, commercial astronaut, and super angel investor in the NewSpace industry. He is the chairman and CEO of Voyager Technologies Inc (formerly Voyager Space Holdings) and former global president of Colliers International.

== Early life and education ==
Dylan E. Taylor was born on October 23, 1970, in Denver, Colorado. He grew up in Idaho where his father was a professor of metallurgical engineering at the University of Idaho.

Taylor attended the University of Arizona where he graduated with a bachelor's degree in engineering in 1993. He later earned an MBA from the University of Chicago.

== Career ==
Taylor began his career in Chicago working for the Swiss electronics company Saia-Burgess. At the time, he was one of the few employees of the company working in North America. By around 2000, Taylor was a general manager at the company overseeing a few thousand U.S. employees. In the early 2000s, Taylor left Saia-Burgess to move back to Chicago where he joined LaSalle Partners, an investment banking and real estate services firm. He was promoted several times at LaSalle before he left in 2009 to join Colliers International, a real estate services firm based Toronto.

While Taylor was at Colliers, the company grew from an annual revenue of $400 million to about $3 billion. In 2011 and 2012, Taylor was CEO of Colliers International's operations in the US, and was based in Seattle, Washington. He later became CEO of the company's operations in the Americas.

By the time the company went public in 2015, Taylor owned a significant share of Collier. From June 2015 to June 2019, Taylor served as Global President of Colliers International, before he was initially fired for misconduct relating to improper trading. According to Ars Technica, a "subsequent investigation, however, found there had been no improper dealings", and "Taylor and Colliers issued a joint statement, amicably settling the matter."

== Space investment and flight ==
Taylor became interested in the space industry in 2007 when he met Eric Anderson, co-founder of Space Adventures and became an investor in Anderson's ventures. He was initially an angel investor and focused on the space industry. His investments included in World View Enterprises in Arizona which is developing high-altitude balloons and Golden Spike Company in Colorado which planned to offer private commercial space transportation to the Moon. Taylor, along with Mark Cuban, was an early investor in Relativity Space.

In 2017, Taylor founded Space For Humanity, a nonprofit that plans to purchase seats on commercial spaceflight for people who typically would not have access. In February 2017, Taylor became the first private citizen to manufacture an item in space when a gravity meter he commissioned and co-designed was printed on the International Space Station. The item was subsequently donated to the Museum of Science and Industry in Chicago.

In October 2019, Taylor founded Voyager Space Holdings, a holding company focused exclusively on the space industry. The firm has acquired several companies, including Altius Space Machines, X.O. Markets (parent company of Nanoracks), and The Launch Company. Taylor serves as the chairman and CEO of Voyager Space Holdings.

He has been interviewed and quoted about the future of the Space-related economy and space investing. He has written articles for SpaceNews and other industry publications. Taylor is also co-founding patron of the Commercial Spaceflight Federation. In June 2020, Xplore announced that Taylor, on behalf of Space For Humanity, had reserved payload space on its first mission beyond Earth orbit.

In February 2025, Voyager Space Holdings changed its name to Voyager Technologies Inc.

In June 2026, it was announced that Voyager Technologies Inc was acquiring Astrobotic for ~$300 million.

=== Blue Origin space flight ===
Taylor was among the tourists that flew into space on December 11, 2021, with Michael Strahan on Blue Origin NS-19. Taylor was one of four paying passengers on the six-person crew that took a 10-minute flight. The New Shepard rocket launched the crew to an altitude of 351,225 feet (107,053 meters) and returned to back to Earth. Taylor, along with the other members of Blue Origins NS-19, were the final recipients of the FAA Commercial Space Astronaut Wings, an aviator wings-like badge created by the Federal Aviation Administration to encourage and draw attention to commercial space flight.

== Awards and honors ==
The World Economic Forum recognized Taylor as a Young Global Leader in 2011. He was named a Henry Crown Fellow of the Aspen Institute in 2014. Taylor earned the University of Arizona's College of Engineering's Alumnus of the Year Award in 2018. He was named by PitchBook as one of Top 10 VC investors in the space tech industry in 2019. He received the Commercial Spaceflight Federation's Commercial Space Business & Finance Award in 2020. In 2022, he was named the recipient of the Space Tourism Award for Catalyst

== Personal life ==
Taylor is married to Gabrielle V. Taylor. They have two daughters and live in Colorado.

== See also ==
- List of people who descended to Challenger Deep
