= Blue Origin NS-30 =

2025 private sub-orbital human spaceflight

- Mission type: Sub-orbital human spaceflight
- Mission duration: 10 minutes, 8 seconds
- Apogee: 107 km (66 mi)

Spacecraft properties
- Spacecraft: RSS First Step
- Manufacturer: Blue Origin

Crew
- Crew size: 6
- Members: Lane Bess; Jesús Calleja; Tushar Shah; Richard Scott; Elaine Hyde; Russell Wilson

Start of mission
- Launch date: February 25, 2025, 9:49:11 am CST (15:49:11 UTC)
- Rocket: New Shepard (NS4)
- Launch site: Corn Ranch, LS-1
- Contractor: Blue Origin

End of mission
- Landing date: February 25, 2025, 9:59:19 am CST (15:59:19 UTC)
- Landing site: Corn Ranch
- Blue Origin NS-30 mission patch New Shepard flights

Blue Origin NS-30 was a sub-orbital spaceflight mission, operated by Blue Origin, which launched on February 25, 2025, using the New Shepard rocket.

== Passengers ==
Position	Passenger
Tourist	(United States) Lane Bess; Second spaceflight
Tourist	(Spain) Jesús Calleja; First spaceflight
Tourist	(India) Tushar Shah; First spaceflight
Tourist	(United States) Richard Scott; First spaceflight
Tourist	(Singapore) (Australia) Elaine Hyde; First spaceflight
Tourist	(Australia) Russell Wilson; First spaceflight

=== Details ===
The flight's passengers include Lane Bess on his second flight on New Shepard, his first being Blue Origin NS-19 in 2021, Jesús Calleja, a Spanish mountaineer, Tushar Shah, Richard Scott, Australians Elaine Hyde and Russell Wilson.
