= Jesús Calleja =

Spanish mountaineer (born 1965)

- Born: Jesús González Calleja; April 11, 1965 (age 61); Fresno de la Vega
- Occupations: Mountaineer; Adventurer; Television journalist; Actornauta

Jesús González Calleja (born 11 April 1965), is a Spanish mountaineer, adventurer and television journalist.

Calleja climbed the Cho Oyu in 2004, the Mount Everest through the north face in 2005, then the Puncak Jaya, Vinson Massif, Denali and Lhotse in 2006, the Elbrus en 2007, and the Aconcagua in 2008. In 2010, he descended 1,600 m down the Krubera Cave.

On February 25, 2025, Calleja flew on the Blue Origin NS-30 sub-orbital mission to become the first Spanish non-professional astronaut to visit outer space.

Calleja has also competed at the Dakar Rally off-road race. His only finish was a 30th place in the cars classification in the 2020 edition.
