= Blue Origin NS-19 =

2021 American crewed sub-orbital spaceflight

- Mission type: Sub-orbital human spaceflight
- Operator: Blue Origin
- Mission duration: 10 minutes, 13 seconds
- Apogee: 107 km (66 mi)

Spacecraft properties
- Spacecraft: RSS First Step
- Manufacturer: Blue Origin

Crew
- Crew size: 6
- Members: Laura Shepard Churchley; Michael Strahan; Dylan Taylor; Evan Dick; Lane Bess; Cameron Bess

Start of mission
- Launch date: 11 December 2021, 9:00:42 am CST (15:00:42 UTC)
- Rocket: New Shepard (NS4)
- Launch site: Corn Ranch, LS-1
- Contractor: Blue Origin

End of mission
- Landing date: 11 December 2021, 9:10:55 am CST (15:10:55 UTC)
- Landing site: Corn Ranch
- Blue Origin NS-19 mission patch New Shepard flights

Blue Origin NS-19 was a New Shepard sub-orbital spaceflight mission operated by Blue Origin that launched on 11 December 2021. The flight was scheduled to launch on 9 December 2021, later delayed to 11 December 2021.

The mission patch of the flight also featured the initials of Glen de Vries who died in a plane crash a month after flying on Blue Origin's previous flight NS-18. The passengers of NS-19 were the final recipients of the FAA Commercial Space Astronaut Wings, an aviator wings-like badge created by the Federal Aviation Administration to encourage and draw attention to commercial space flight.

Notably, the launch of NS-19 occurred the day after a tornado caused the collapse of an Amazon warehouse in Illinois, killing six workers. Jeff Bezos both attended and publicly celebrated the launch of NS-19 on Instagram multiple hours before releasing a statement on Twitter about the warehouse collapse, which drew controversy from some users of the site.

== Passengers ==
The passengers on NS-19 were nicknamed the "Original Six". They included Laura Shepard Churchley, daughter of the first U.S. astronaut in space, as well the namesake for the New Shepard spaceflight program, Alan Shepard, and Michael Strahan, a Hall of Fame former New York Giants defensive end, as well as a co-anchor of Good Morning America and analyst for Fox NFL Sunday; both as guests of Blue Origin. Paying passengers included executive Dylan Taylor, investor Evan Dick, Bess Ventures founder Lane Bess and his child, Cameron. The latter became the first parent and child on the same spaceflight. Cameron Bess became the youngest American at age 23 (Until Karsen Kitchen on NS-26 at age 21 on August 29, 2024.), first to go with a parent, first openly furry, and first openly pansexual to fly to space.

Strahan, at 6 feet, 5 inches tall (196 cm), became the tallest person in history to reach space.

Position	Passenger
Tourist	(United States) Michael Strahan; First spaceflight
Tourist	(United States) Laura Shepard Churchley; First spaceflight
Tourist	(United States) Dylan Taylor; First spaceflight
Tourist	(United States) Lane Bess; First spaceflight
Tourist	(United States) Cameron Bess; First spaceflight
Tourist	(United States) Evan Dick; First spaceflight
