= Golden Spike Company =

American space transport startup company

- Type: Private
- Industry: Commercial spaceflight
- Founded: 2010
- Headquarters: Colorado, USA
- Key people: Alan Stern; Gerald D. Griffin
- Website: goldenspikecompany.com, archive

The Golden Spike Company was an American space transport startup active from 2010 to 2013. The company was chartered for business in Colorado with the objective to offer private commercial space transportation services to the surface of the Moon. The name of the company is in reference to the ceremonial final spike placed in the first transcontinental railroad upon its completion. The company's Internet site was taken offline in September 2015.

== History ==
The company was formally announced at a press conference held on December 6, 2012, at the National Press Club, wherein details of the company and its ambitions were presented.

Golden Spike was founded in 2010 by Alan Stern, former NASA associate administrator for science (2007-2008), and Gerry Griffin, former NASA Johnson Space Center Director. Griffin was the initial chairman of the board. Additional members of the board of directors in 2012 were space entrepreneur Esther Dyson and Taber MacCallum, co-founder and CEO of Paragon Space Development Corp. Other advisers include former speaker of the U.S. House of Representatives Newt Gingrich, former NASA Space Shuttle manager Wayne Hale, author and aeronautical engineer Homer Hickam, and former governor of New Mexico Bill Richardson.

== Plans and resources ==
Company president and CEO Alan Stern announced in briefing papers that the company had commenced feasibility studies into commercial missions to the Moon from early 2010 and formed the company in the third quarter of that year. Since then, the company had been building its business models and soliciting investment. The company had budgeted between $7 and $8 billion to achieve their objective, followed by approximately $1.5 billion fee per each "two-human lunar surface mission". Golden Spike would follow a model like that of the Russian spaceflight industry in the 1980s and 1990s. The company said it can cut costs by partnering with other aerospace companies and using existing rockets or rockets already in development, needing to only build a lunar lander and a specialized spacesuit for astronauts for the Moon. Stern said they expected to sign up as many as 15 to 20 countries or foreign space agencies as well as companies and individuals who want to explore the Moon for science or adventure. They had identified a mission profile, including various launch options as well as trajectory and spacecraft for landing on the Moon. It involved two sets of two launches from Earth to Earth orbit: one set for the lander and the propulsion unit to send it to Moon orbit, and the other set for the crew vehicle and the propulsion unit to send it to Moon orbit. The two propulsion units are then disposed of. In Moon orbit, the lander and the crew vehicle have a rendez-vous, and the crew move to the lander. They land and return to the crew vehicle, and return to Earth in the crew vehicle.

Spacecraft and components used by this company would have been manufactured by American companies. The first robotic flights to the Moon were proposed to take place by 2020.

=== Lunar lander ===
In January 2013, Golden Spike contracted with Northrop Grumman for the design of a lunar lander, as one component of their "head start" commercial lunar architecture. Contracted tasks included "reviewing requirements and synthesizing a set of study ground rules and assumptions emphasizing system reliability, automated/ground command operability, and affordability, establishing velocity (Δv) budgets from and to low lunar orbit for pragmatic lunar landing sites, exploring a wide variety of lunar lander concept options, including staging, propellants, engines, reusability, autonomy, systems capabilities for exploration, as well as landing site flexibility, and establishing the design trade space and pragmatic limits for future more detailed analysis and development."

== Reaction ==
Scientific American wrote that "Golden Spike's plans rank among the most audacious privately funded space exploration missions ever proposed." Former director of NASA Johnson Space Center says "If NASA wants a ride, we'd be glad to put them on our railroad". NASA was supportive of the effort, and said it showed the merits of supporting commercial spaceflight.

John E. Pike of GlobalSecurity.org said that the company's cost estimate was unrealistic: "Stern doesn’t have enough zeros in his budget."

The company's Indiegogo funding campaign raised $19,450 of its $240,000 goal.

== See also ==
- Moon Express
- Shackleton Energy Company
- Space Adventures
- SpaceX
