= Michael Strahan =

American football player and television presenter (born 1971)

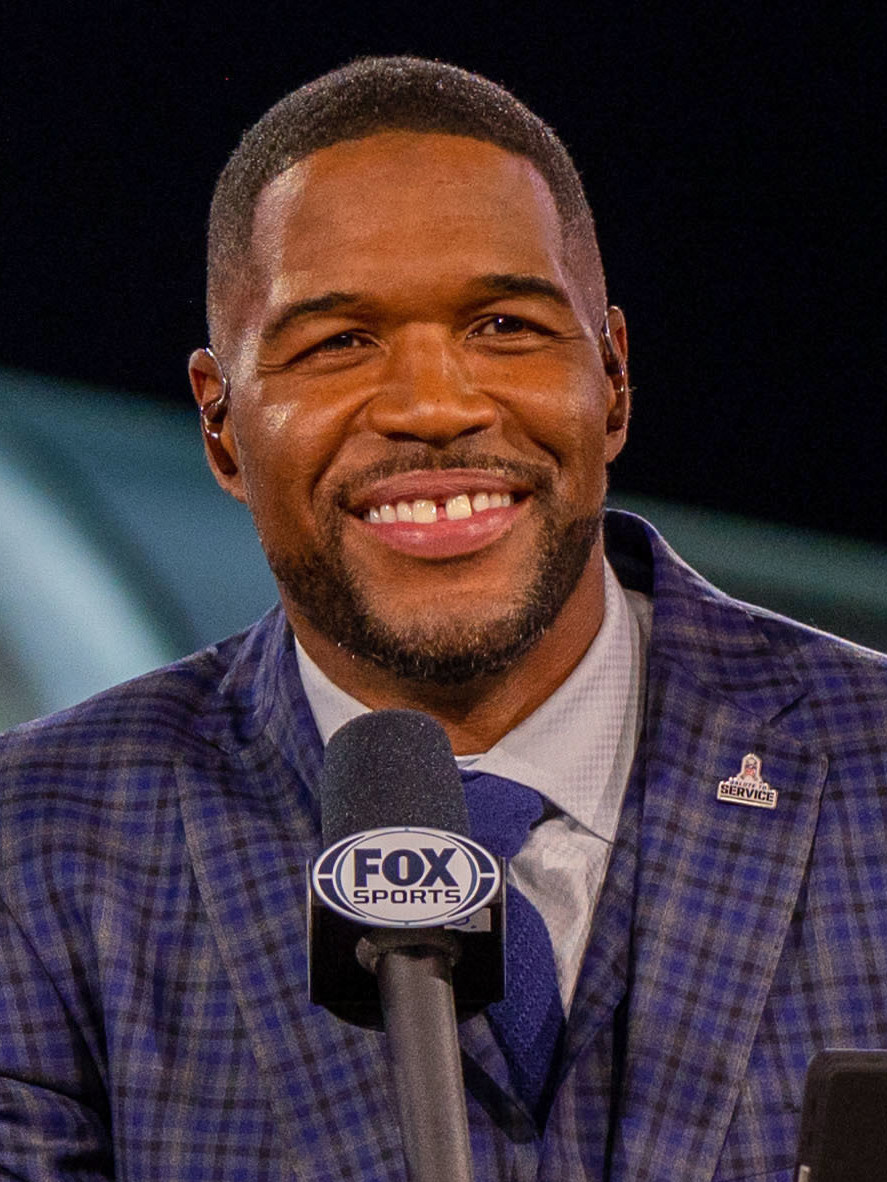
- Strahan in 2022

No. 92
- Position: Defensive end

Personal information
- Born: November 21, 1971 (age 55); Houston, Texas, U.S.
- Listed height: 6 ft 5 in (1.96 m)
- Listed weight: 255 lb (116 kg)

Career information
- High school: Westbury (Houston)
- College: Texas Southern (1989–1992)
- NFL draft: 1993: 2nd round, 40th overall pick

Career history
- New York Giants (1993–2007)

Awards and highlights
- Super Bowl champion (XLII); NFL Defensive Player of the Year (2001); 4× First-team All-Pro (1997, 1998, 2001, 2003); 2× Second-team All-Pro (2002, 2005); 7× Pro Bowl (1997–1999, 2001–2003, 2005); 2× NFL sacks leader (2001, 2003); NFL forced fumbles co-leader (2001); NFL 2000s All-Decade Team; New York Giants Ring of Honor; New York Giants No. 92 retired; 5th greatest New York Giant of all-time

Career NFL statistics
- Total tackles: 854
- Sacks: 141.5
- Forced fumbles: 24
- Fumble recoveries: 15
- Interceptions: 4
- Defensive touchdowns: 3
- Stats at Pro Football Reference
- Pro Football Hall of Fame
- College Football Hall of Fame

Michael Anthony Strahan (/ˈstreɪhæn/ STRAY-han; born November 21, 1971) is an American television host and former professional football defensive end who played in the National Football League (NFL) for 15 seasons with the New York Giants. A dominant pass rusher, Strahan set the NFL single-season record for quarterback sacks and helped the Giants win Super Bowl XLII in his final season in 2007. He was inducted into the Pro Football Hall of Fame in 2014.

After retiring from the NFL, Strahan became a media personality. He appears as a football analyst on Fox NFL Sunday, and served as a co-host of ABC's Good Morning America as well as Live! with Kelly and Michael with Kelly Ripa from 2012 to 2016, for which he won two Daytime Emmy Awards. He has also made guest appearances on game shows and other programs. In 2014, he became a regular contributor on Good Morning America, and in 2016 the network announced that Strahan would be leaving Live! to join GMA full-time. He also hosts the current incarnation of the Pyramid game show for ABC.

Strahan flew on a suborbital space flight on December 11, 2021, aboard the Blue Origin NS-19. At 6 feet 5 inches (1.96 m), he became the tallest person to fly in space.

== Early life ==
Strahan was born in Houston. He is the nephew of retired NFL defensive lineman Art Strahan. When Strahan was nine, his family moved to Army post BFV (Benjamin Franklin Village) in Mannheim, West Germany. Strahan attended Mannheim American High School (MAHS), a US Department of Defense Dependent High School, and played linebacker for the Mannheim Bison, the school's football team.

The summer before Strahan's senior year of high school, his father sent him to live with his uncle Art in Houston so that he could attend Westbury High School. Strahan played one season of football, which was enough to earn him to get a scholarship offer from Texas Southern University.

== College career ==
Strahan followed in the footsteps of his uncle Art, who also played defensive end at Texas Southern University. Strahan was so dominant that he drew double teams, and TSU coaches dubbed Strahan double teaming "Strahan rules". By his junior season, Strahan began to turn himself into an NFL prospect. As a senior with the Texas Southern Tigers, Strahan was selected to the All-America first-team by The Poor Man's Guide to the NFL Draft, The Sheridan Network, Edd Hayes Black College Sports Report and the Associated Press. He recorded 68 tackles with a school-record 19 quarterback sacks and 32 tackles totaling 142 yards in losses. He was also selected Division I-AA Defensive Player of the Year by The Poor Man's Guide and Edd Hayes Black College Sports Report. In 1992, he was named First-team All-Southwestern Athletic Conference (SWAC) and the SWAC's Player of the Year for the second consecutive season. He was also named Black College Defensive Player of the Year. As a junior in 1991, Strahan led the SWAC with 14.5 quarterback sacks. His 41.5 career sacks are a Texas Southern record. He was inducted into the Black College Football Hall of Fame in 2014. He was inducted into the College Football Hall of Fame in 2025.

== Professional career ==
Pre-draft measurables
Height	Weight	Arm length	Hand span	40-yard dash	10-yard split	20-yard split	20-yard shuttle	Vertical jump	Broad jump	Bench press
6 ft 4 1/4 in (1.94 m)	252 lb (114 kg)	34 1/2 in (0.88 m)	10 1/8 in (0.26 m)	4.94 s	1.65 s	2.83 s	4.47 s	32.5 in (0.83 m)	10 ft 0 in (3.05 m)	25 reps
All values from NFL Combine

=== Early career ===
Strahan was selected in the second round by the New York Giants in 1993. He played in only six games due to injuries, and missed the Giants' two playoff games that season. After a few unremarkable seasons, Strahan had a breakout season in 1997, recording 14 sacks. He was voted into his first Pro Bowl and was also named First-team All-Pro by the Associated Press. In 1998, Strahan continued his success, racking up 15 sacks and being voted into his second Pro-Bowl and All-Pro team. In week 8 of the 1999 season, Strahan returned an interception 44 yards for a game-winning overtime touchdown in a 23–17 win over the Philadelphia Eagles.

=== Middle career ===
Strahan was a member of the 2000 Giants and participated in their playoff run to Super Bowl XXXV. Despite coming off a strong NFC Championship Game, where the Giants defeated the Minnesota Vikings 41–0, the Baltimore Ravens proved too strong for the Giants and they were handily defeated by a score of 34–7. In 2002, Strahan and the Giants negotiated on a new contract. He said the team failed to negotiate after he turned down its first contract proposal. He accused the front office of not trying to be competitive in 2002. Four days later, running back Tiki Barber ripped him for being selfish and greedy. The two had a heated phone conversation that night, and Strahan said they no longer speak. It also surfaced in the spring that the Giants explored trading Strahan, after which he suggested that management had orchestrated the contract flap to make him look bad. The team denied that.

Few defensive ends in the NFL were more dominant than Strahan from 1997 to 2005. He was named the 2001 NFL Defensive Player of the Year and was a two-time NFC Defensive Player of the Year (in 2001 and 2003). Throughout the greater part of the 2004 season, Strahan was injured with a torn pectoral muscle, which limited him to only four sacks. He rebounded in 2005, returning to the Pro Bowl, with his protégé, Osi Umenyiora, as the two combined for 26 sacks while anchoring the Giants' defense. Strahan was considered by many coaches, peers, and experts as the standard, and best at his position during the prime of his career (1997–2005). He was also regarded as one of if not the best defensive end ever at defending the run, which made people and peers view him as a complete defensive end.

==== 2001: Set single season sack record ====
In the 2001 season, Strahan set the NFL record for sacks in a single season with 22.5, the highest tally since it was made an official statistic in 1982, breaking New York Jet Mark Gastineau's total of 22. In the final game of the season on January 6, 2002, with Strahan coming free, Green Bay Packers quarterback Brett Favre slid down and Strahan fell on top of Favre for an easy sack. After the play, during the ensuing celebration, many of the Giants' defensive players patted Favre on the helmet. At least one observer accused Favre of deliberately falling to ensure that Strahan would get the record. However, Packers right tackle Mark Tauscher claimed it was just a bad play and "we wanted to avoid that sack."

=== Later career ===
On October 23, 2006, with a sack on Drew Bledsoe in a Monday Night Football game against the Dallas Cowboys, Strahan tied Lawrence Taylor for the Giants franchise record for most career sacks with 132 1/2 (this total does not include 9 1/2 sacks accrued by Taylor in his rookie season of 1981, the year before sacks became an official NFL statistic). It was the last sack Strahan would get that season, as two weeks later he suffered a Lisfranc fracture in a game against the Houston Texans and would miss the remainder of the season and the playoffs.

It seemed as though Strahan would retire after the 2006 season when he did not report to Giants training camp and missed the entire preseason, but the 14-year veteran opted to return for one final year. His 15th and final season proved to be the Giants' first championship since 1990. On September 30, 2007, he sacked Donovan McNabb from the Philadelphia Eagles on Sunday Night Football, increasing his career total to 133.5, setting a new franchise record. On Sunday, February 3, 2008, at the University of Phoenix Stadium in Glendale, Arizona, Strahan had two tackles and one sack in Super Bowl XLII, in what is considered one of the biggest upsets in NFL history. Bolstered by a strong defense and unrelenting pass rush, the Giants went on to win the game 17–14, over the previously undefeated New England Patriots, giving Strahan a Super Bowl win. His saying was "Stomp you out!" His final act as a Giant was his acceptance of the Vince Lombardi Trophy alongside John Mara, Steve Tisch and Tom Coughlin.

On June 9, 2008, Strahan retired from the NFL.

Strahan retired with 141.5 career sacks (fifth all-time when he retired), 854 career tackles, four career interceptions, 24 forced fumbles, and three career touchdowns in 200 games over a 15-year career (through the 2007 season). He was also named to the Pro Bowl roster seven times.

On February 2, 2013, Strahan failed to be voted into the Pro Football Hall of Fame; 2013 was his first year of eligibility.

Super Bowl XLVIII, played in East Rutherford, New Jersey, was dedicated to Strahan upon his induction into the Pro Football Hall of Fame in 2014. Strahan performed the ceremonial coin toss, accompanied by the other members of that year's PFHOF class. Strahan also commented on the trophy presentation for Fox, since Terry Bradshaw (who had commented on the trophy presentations for Fox's previous Super Bowl broadcasts) was mourning the death of his father. On November 3, 2014, he was presented his Hall of Fame ring at halftime of a New York Giants–Indianapolis Colts game by the Giants. In attendance were 100 former Giants players as well as former teammates of Strahan's.

On November 28, 2021, the Giants retired his number 92 at halftime of their game against the Philadelphia Eagles.

On May 6, 2025, Strahan announced that he was looking to become a minority shareholder of his former team, the New York Giants.

== NFL career statistics ==
Legend
	NFL Defensive Player of the Year
	Won the Super Bowl
	Led the league
**Bold**	Career high

Year	Team	GP	Tackles				Fumbles				Interceptions					
Year	Team	GP	Cmb	Solo	Ast	Sck	FF	FR	Yds	TD	Int	Yds	Avg	Lng	TD	PD
1993	NYG	9	3	1	2	1.0	0	0	0	0	0	0	0.0	0	0	0
1994	NYG	15	38	25	13	4.5	1	0	0	0	0	0	0.0	0	0	0
1995	NYG	15	58	48	10	7.5	3	0	0	0	**2**	**56**	28.0	**56**	0	**5**
1996	NYG	16	62	52	10	5.0	1	0	0	0	0	0	0.0	0	0	3
1997	NYG	16	68	46	**22**	14.0	2	1	0	0	0	0	0.0	0	0	2
1998	NYG	16	67	53	14	15.0	2	0	0	0	1	24	24.0	24	**1**	4
1999	NYG	16	60	41	19	5.5	0	2	0	0	1	44	**44.0**	44	**1**	3
2000	NYG	16	66	50	16	9.5	0	**4**	0	0	0	0	0.0	0	0	4
2001	NYG	16	73	60	13	**22.5**	**6**	1	**13**	**1**	0	0	0.0	0	0	2
2002	NYG	16	70	55	15	11.0	3	1	0	0	0	0	0.0	0	0	2
2003	NYG	16	76	**61**	15	18.5	3	1	0	0	0	0	0.0	0	0	**5**
2004	NYG	8	34	24	10	4.0	1	3	0	0	0	0	0.0	0	0	0
2005	NYG	16	**81**	59	**22**	11.5	1	1	0	0	0	0	0.0	0	0	2
2006	NYG	9	38	28	10	3.0	0	0	0	0	0	0	0.0	0	0	2
2007	NYG	16	57	45	12	9.0	1	1	4	0	0	0	0.0	0	0	2
Career		216	854	651	203	141.5	24	15	17	1	4	124	31.0	56	2	36

== Awards and honors ==
NFL

- Super Bowl champion (XLII)
- NFL Defensive Player of the Year (2001)
- 4× First-team All-Pro (1997, 1998, 2001, 2003)
- 2× Second-team All-Pro (2002, 2005)
- 7× Pro Bowl (1997–1999, 2001–2003, 2005)
- 2× NFL sacks leader (2001, 2003)
- NFL forced fumbles co-leader (2001)
- NFL 2000s All-Decade Team
- New York Giants Ring of Honor
- New York Giants No. 92 retired
- 5th greatest New York Giant of all-time
- 100 sacks club
- Pro Football Hall of Fame (2014)
- No. 99 on The Top 100: NFL's Greatest Players

NCAA

- Associated Press first-team college-division All-American (1992)
- Edd Hayes' Black College Sports All-American (1992)
- College Football Hall of Fame (2025)
- Black College Football Hall of Fame (2014)

Other

- 2× Daytime Emmy Award for Outstanding Entertainment Talk Show Host (2015, 2016 - with Kelly Ripa)
- Star on the Hollywood Walk of Fame (2023)
- ABC To Tell The Truth-Doris Award (2020)

== Spaceflight ==
Strahan flew on a suborbital space flight on December 11, 2021, aboard the Blue Origin NS-19. At 6 feet 5 inches (1.96 m), he became the tallest person to fly in space. Strahan, along with the other members of Blue Origins NS-19, were the final recipients of the FAA Commercial Space Astronaut Wings, an aviator wings-like badge created by the Federal Aviation Administration to encourage and draw attention to commercial space flight.

== Media career ==
=== Fox NFL ===
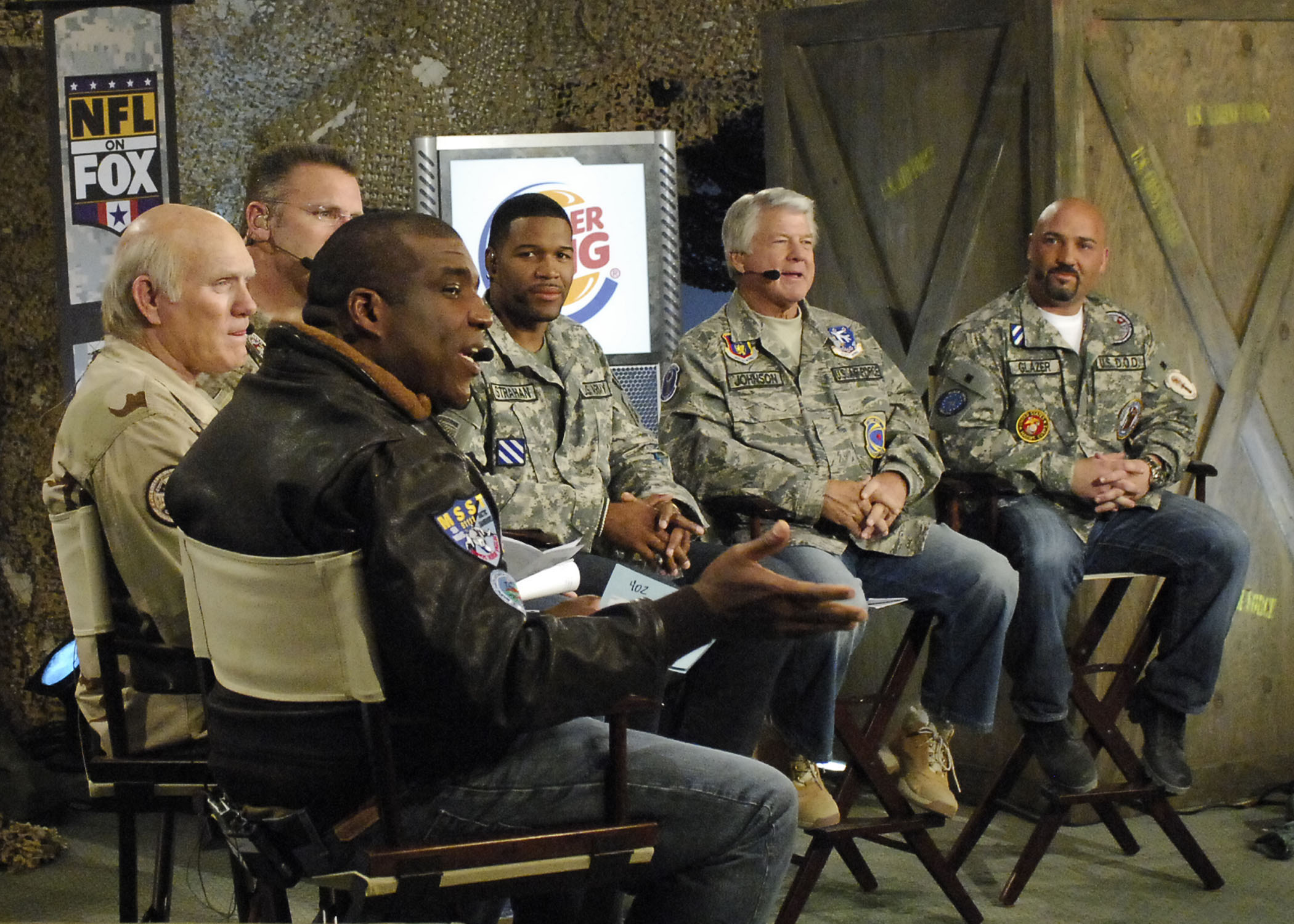
Strahan (center) with his Fox NFL Sunday co-hosts and the United States Air Force at the Bagram Airfield in 2009

On June 24, 2008, it was announced that Strahan would be joining the Fox NFL Sunday pregame show, alongside host Curt Menefee and analysts Terry Bradshaw, Howie Long, and Jimmy Johnson.

When Fox acquired the rights to broadcast Thursday Night Football in 2018, it was decided to have Strahan host the Fox NFL Thursday pregame show, along with Bradshaw and Long. Fox NFL Thursday is televised live from New York City instead of from the Fox NFL Sunday studios in Los Angeles so it can accommodate Strahan's other live shows (see below), since a coast-to-coast commute on a Thursday night/early Friday morning would be impractical.

=== Live! and Good Morning America ===
On October 1, 2010, Strahan co-hosted Live! with Regis and Kelly as a guest host with Kelly Ripa for the first time when Regis Philbin was absent on the show. Philbin left in November 2011, leaving an empty spot. After twenty guest appearances over two years, Strahan was selected as Kelly Ripa's new co-host on September 4, 2012, marking his first official day on the rechristened syndicated talk show, Live! with Kelly and Michael. Ratings instantly surged, impressively generating year-over-year time slot gains across all key demographics, towering over its nearest competition, the fourth hour of NBC's Today, by 87 percent. On April 19, 2016, ABC announced that Strahan would be leaving Live! with Kelly and Michael to begin working full-time on Good Morning America. Strahan together with co-host Ripa won a Daytime Emmy twice for "Outstanding Talk Show Host" during his tenure on the show.

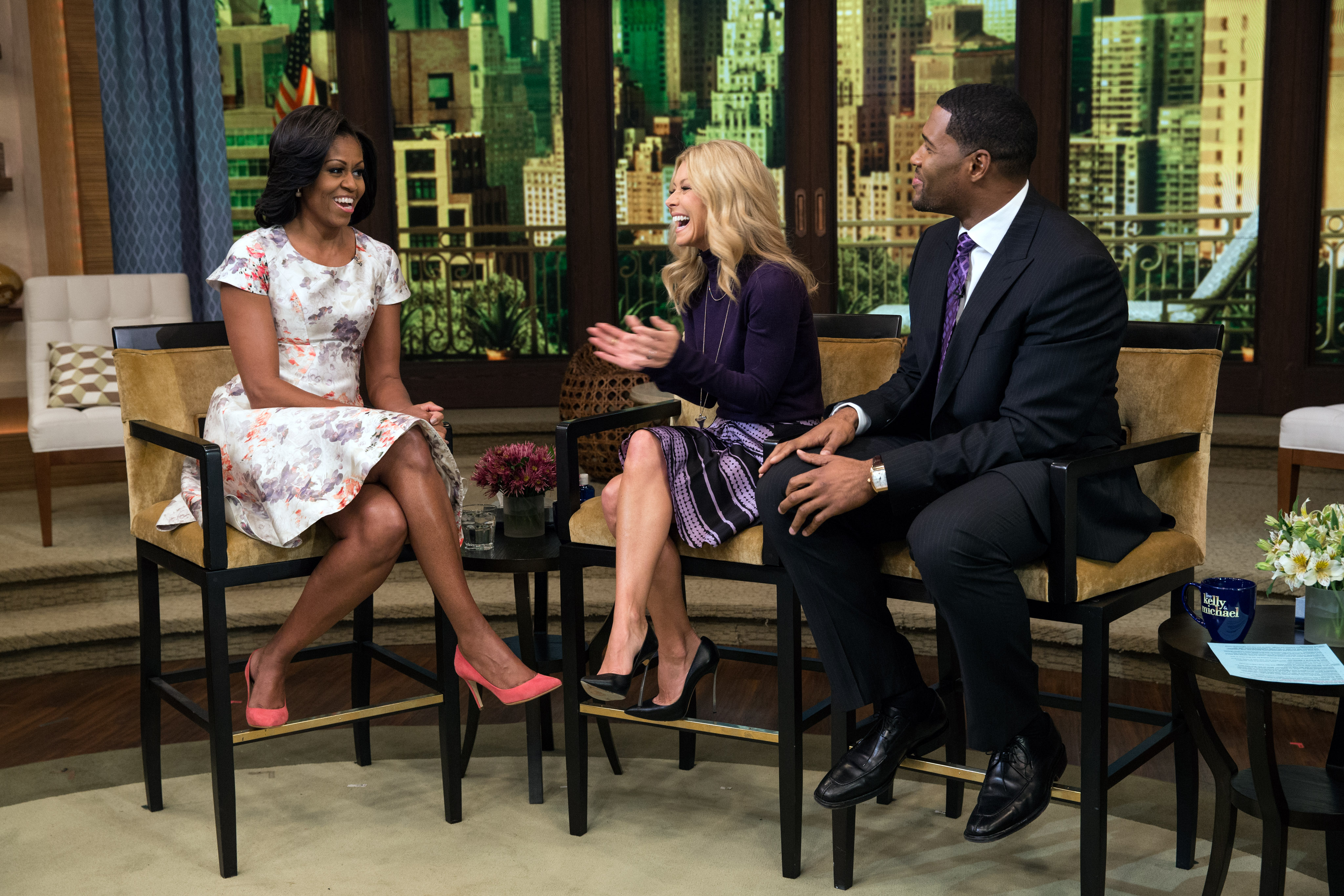
Strahan taping an episode of Live! with Michelle Obama.

In 2018, Strahan began co-hosting a daytime talk show spin-off of Good Morning America, originally titled GMA Day, alongside Sara Haines. In January 2019, the program was retitled Strahan and Sara, then finally Strahan, Sara and Keke in August 2019, to coincide with the addition of actress Keke Palmer. The show was put on hiatus in March 2020 due to ABC News coverage of the COVID-19 pandemic. It was officially cancelled in the fall of that year.

=== The $100,000 Pyramid ===
In 2016, ABC announced that Strahan would be hosting a summer revival of The $100,000 Pyramid, which would air on Sunday nights along with the Steve Harvey-hosted Celebrity Family Feud and the Alec Baldwin-hosted Match Game as part of a "Sunday Fun & Games" lineup. Strahan said that Pyramid was one of his favorite game shows growing up. The series has since been renewed for six seasons. Pyramid did not air in the summer of 2020 due to the COVID-19 pandemic.

=== Other guest appearances ===
- Strahan was the host of the home improvement program Backyard Stadiums on DIY Network, where he and a team of contractors and gardeners lay out sports courses and goals in backyards.
- In September 2008, Strahan starred in VIP Like Me, a web series for Snickers.
- In 2008, Strahan guest-starred on an episode of Chuck, "Chuck Versus the Break-Up". He played Mitt, a bully and leader of the Mighty Jocks.
- Strahan starred as Michael Trainor in the television sitcom Brothers, which ran on Fox from September 25 to December 27, 2009.
- In the episode of Lip Sync Battle that originally aired on April 30, 2015, Strahan competed against Today co-host Hoda Kotb with performances of Fergie's "London Bridge" and Bell Biv DeVoe's Poison". He lost.
- Strahan was a guest on the show Wild 'n Out during its sixth season, which aired in 2014.
- Strahan played Augustus in the 2015 film Magic Mike XXL.
- Strahan guest-starred in the Halloween episode of Black-ish as June Bug, Dre's cousin.
- In 2018, Strahan was a guest on Beat Bobby Flay during its 18th season. He and Michael Symon appeared in the episode Aged To Perfection.
- In 2019, Strahan made a cameo appearance in the movie Charlie's Angels as Bosley from the Townsend Agency's New York branch.
- In 2023, Strahan was a guest judge on Season 32 of Dancing with the Stars.

=== Advertising ===
- Strahan starred in an award-winning commercial series for Vaseline Men
- Strahan, along with former New York Giants defensive end and teammate Justin Tuck, appeared in Subway's "$5 Foot-long" commercials.
- Strahan did a commercial for CA Technologies for their new product Total Defense r12.
- In 2015, Strahan wrote and published a motivational book, Wake Up Happy: The Dream Big, Win Big Guide to Transforming Your Life.
- On September 8, 2015, Strahan launched a men's clothing line exclusively through JCPenney. It Includes suits, blazers, sports shirts, belts, ties, cufflinks, suspenders, and other accessories.

=== Public image ===
Many consider the gap between his two middle-upper front teeth as his “signature” feature.

== Personal life ==
His uncle, Art Strahan, played as a defensive lineman for the Houston Oilers (1965) and Atlanta Falcons (1968). In an episode of Finding Your Roots, Strahan learned that he has Anglo-Saxon ancestry that traces directly to Charlemagne, who is his 39-great-grandfather.

Strahan was married to his first wife, Wanda Hutchins, from 1992 to 1996. Hutchins is an American businesswoman, interior designer, and home decorator. They have a daughter and a son. Strahan moved them to the U.S. and purchased a $163,000 house in the same Houston neighborhood where his parents live.

In 1999, Strahan married Jean Muggli after meeting her at a spa. They had twin daughters, born December 2004. Strahan and Muggli finalized their divorce on July 20, 2006. In January 2007, Judge James B. Convery awarded Muggli $15 million in a divorce settlement in addition to $18,000 monthly child support. Strahan appealed. In March 2007, the court ordered the Montclair, New Jersey mansion to be auctioned and the sales money split evenly; the house was valued at $3.6 million.

In August 2009, Strahan became engaged to Nicole Mitchell, Eddie Murphy's ex-wife, but the two ended their engagement in 2014. In June 2011, Strahan filmed a commercial supporting legalizing same-sex marriage in New York.

Since around 2015, Strahan has been dating Kayla Quick. Their daughter, Strahan's fifth child, was born in August 2026.

=== Philanthropy ===
In 2002, Strahan had a multimillion-dollar restoration and renovation done on Georgian Heights. The turn-of-the-19th-century mansion is located on 2.3 acres of mountainside property and boasts sweeping views of the Manhattan skyline. The home was built in 1906 at 99 Lloyd Avenue, Montclair, New Jersey. It is a red brick house with a carriage house and a greenhouse that he bought in 2000 for $1.3 million. Before moving in, he allowed the Junior League of Montclair-Newark to use his house as a model home for its charity fundraiser. From May 28 to 31, the League decorated the mansion, had a "bare bones" party and a black-tie affair, and held $25 tours to fund the Junior League programs Children At Risk and HomeCorp. Children At Risk aids children and families and HomeCorp helps low-income people achieve home ownership.

In February 2008, Strahan and Giants teammate Justin Tuck teamed up with Nike to design their own exclusive sneakers for ID studio in New York City. All proceeds from the sneakers were donated to Nike's Let Me Play global campaign.

In December 2018, Strahan volunteered at St. Jude Children's Research Hospital and was featured in a series of holiday promotions.

== See also ==
- New Yorkers in journalism

Media offices
Preceded by Regis Philbin	Live! co-host (with Kelly Ripa); 2012–2016	Succeeded by Ryan Seacrest
