= Lane Bess =

American venture capitalist (born 1961)

- Born: September 18, 1961 (age 65); Neptune City, New Jersey, U.S.
- Education: Carnegie Mellon University
- Known for: Investing, Principal and Founder at Bess Ventures and Advisory
- Spouse: Letty Bess
- Children: Cameron Bess

Lane Bess (born September 18, 1961) is a venture capitalist known for his work in technology. He has served as principal and founder of family fund Bess Ventures and Advisory, LLC, a strategic management, investment and marketing services firm, since February 2015.

== Early life and education ==
Bess graduated from Ocean Township High School in 1979.

In 1983, Bess received a Bachelor of Science degree in Managerial Economics from Carnegie Mellon University. Bess has served as a Trustee of Carnegie Mellon University since June 2019.

== Career ==
Bess held senior sales and marketing positions at NCR Corporation.

Bess also served as President of Trend Micro. In 2008, he became president and CEO of Palo Alto Networks, where in 2010 he was preparing the company for an initial public offering. From 2011 to 2015, Bess was the COO of Zscaler.

Bess serves on the boards of several companies, including Deep Instinct, eSentire, TrueFort, ZeroFOX, PLUM (SPAC).

== Spaceflight ==
On December 11, 2021, Bess flew into space aboard Blue Origin NS-19. Bess, along with the other members of Blue Origins NS-19, were the final recipients of the FAA Commercial Space Astronaut Wings, an aviator wings-like badge created by the Federal Aviation Administration to encourage and draw attention to commercial space flight.

On February 25, 2025, Bess returned to space on Blue Origin NS-30.

== Personal life ==
Bess is married to his wife Letty. His son Cameron Bess accompanied him to space aboard Blue Origin NS-19, making them the first parent-child pair to fly to space together. Cameron is a furry, identifies as pansexual, and streams on Twitch.
