= Quantum Space =

Quantum Space may refer to:

- Quantum Space, a 1989 play-by-email game by Stormfront Studios
- Quantum Space (company), a space industry company founded in 2022
