= Eytan Stibbe =

Israeli fighter pilot, businessman and astronaut (born 1958)

- איתן סטיבה
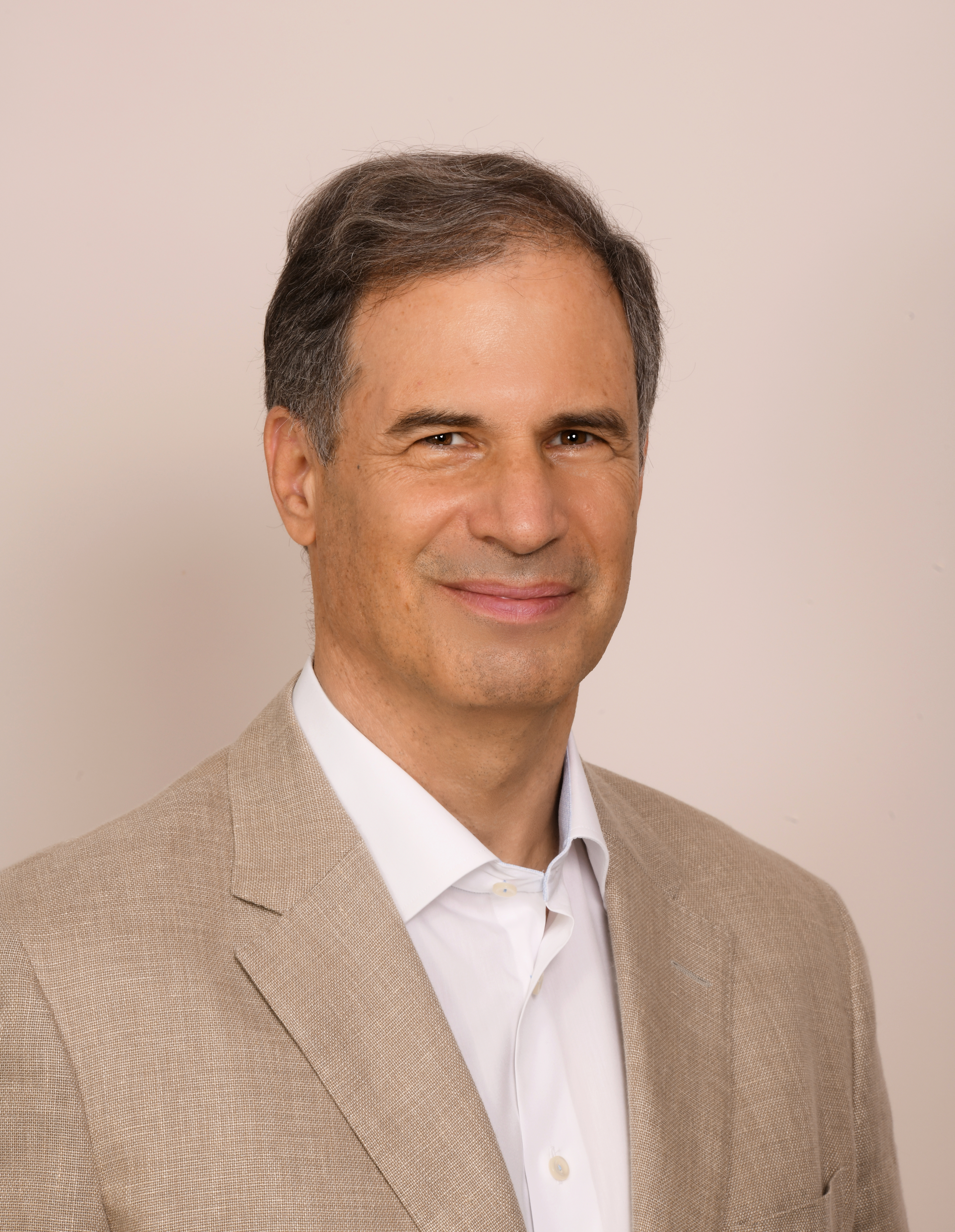
- Born: January 12, 1958 (age 68); Haifa, Israel
- Space career

Axiom Space
- Time in space: 17 days, 1 hour and 48 minutes
- Mission: Axiom Mission 1

Eytan Meir Stibbe (Hebrew: איתן סטיבה; born January 12, 1958) is an Israeli former fighter pilot, businessman and commercial astronaut.

In November 2020 he paid Axiom Space to become a private astronaut on a ten-day mission to the International Space Station aboard a SpaceX Crew Dragon spacecraft on Axiom Mission 1, a private crewed orbital spaceflight. The stay was extended to 17 days.

At the beginning of July, 2025, Eytan Stibbe was appointed Chancellor of the International Space University (ISU) in France. In this role, he took part in the university's academic programs, helped strengthen ties with international partners, promoted educational and research initiatives, and supported ISU's global community of students and alumni.

In 2026, Eytan Stibbe received an honorary doctorate from Ben-Gurion University of the Negev.

== Early life ==
Stibbe was born in Haifa, Israel, in 1958, to parents who had immigrated from the Netherlands in 1953. He grew up in the United States until the age of 7, when the family moved back to Ramat Gan, a suburb of Tel Aviv. His father was a soil and water researcher at the Volcani Institute in Rehovot, and his mother was a social worker at a mental health clinic in Ramat Gan. Stibbe studied at the Blich High School in Ramat Gan and was active in the Israeli Scouts (Tzofim) movement.

== Military career ==
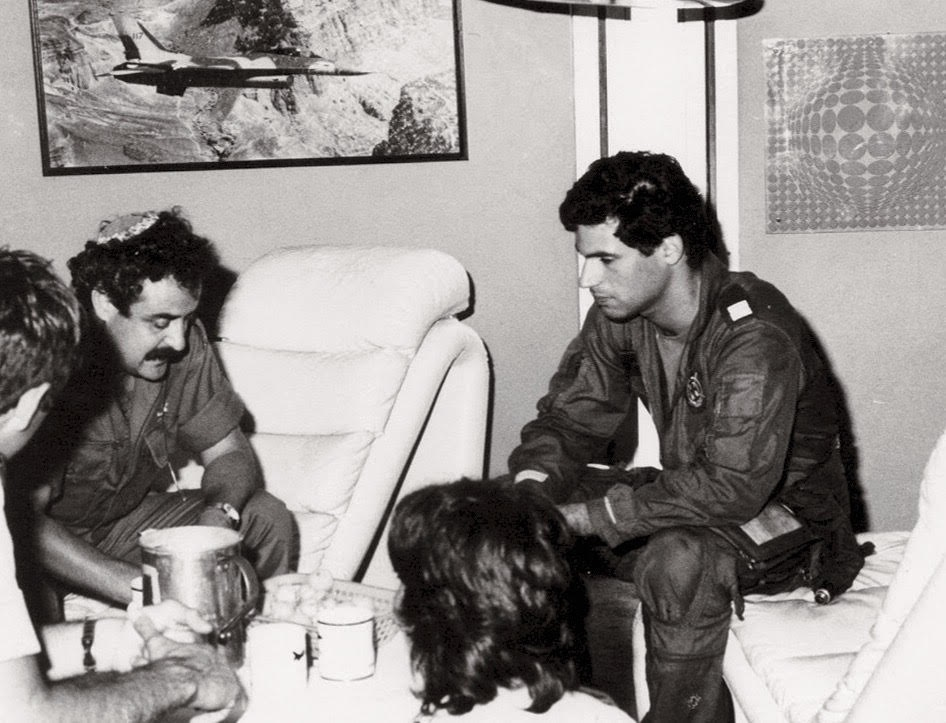
Stibbe, right, during his military service

In July 1976, Stibbe entered the Israeli Air Force's fighter pilot training course. He first served as a Skyhawk pilot in Squadrons 102 and 140, then moved to Squadron 201 (Phantoms) and continued on to become an F-16 pilot in Squadron 117. During his time in the IAF he was assigned to 117 Squadron flying F-16s under the command of Colonel Ilan Ramon, who later became the first ever Israeli to fly in space aboard STS-107. He completed his military service in 1984 and continued to serve as a reservist in Squadron 117 until 2012. He attained the rank of colonel.

== Business career ==
In 1984, after his military service, Stibbe joined a team of advisers at Israel Aircraft Industries that was working on the development of systems for the Lavi fighter jet. In 1985, he was among the founders of the LR Group, with former Israeli Air Force pilots Roy Ben-Yami and Ami Lustig. The LR Group conducted development activities in Africa, including agriculture, construction, infrastructure and defense-related projects. In 2011, he left LR and sold his share of the company (33%). In 2012, he acquired 35% of Mitrelli, an engineering, procurement and construction company (ECP) whose fields of operation were similar to those of LR. In 2018, Stibbe left Mitrelli and sold all of his shares in the company.

Stibbe established Vital Capital Fund in 2010. The company invests in enterprises whose goal is to improve the economic, personal and social wellbeing of low- and middle-income communities. The fund's investment strategy is to invest in companies whose intention is to generate positive, measurable social and environmental impact alongside a competitive financial return.

He is a member of the advisory committee of Bridges Israel, an impact investment fund that invests in Israeli businesses. Stibbe is a partner in HarTech, which develops simulation systems; LISOD, Hospital of Israeli Oncology in Ukraine; Pangea Therapeutics, a digital healthcare company that develops highly personalized cancer medications and treatments based on computational genomics; and Proprep, an online STEM tutorial company.

== Spaceflight ==
On 8 April 2022, Stibbe took off for the International Space Station (ISS) from Cape Canaveral as a space tourist. Stibbe is the 583rd space traveler in the world. He became the second Israeli in space, after Ilan Ramon, who died onboard Columbia while returning from space. Stibbe described his space tourism as the Rakia mission, which was the title of the book published with the fragments of the diary of his late commander, which survived reentry, and was discovered in a field in Texas, and now part of the National Library of Israel. He flew to the ISS aboard SpaceX Axiom Space-1, paying for his own ticket to ride. Stibbe was accompanying and demonstrating many Israeli technologies during this mission along with AstroRad a radiation protective vest from StemRad.

== See also ==
SpaceX Axiom Space-1 spacetravellers

- Larry Connor (mission pilot)
- Mark Pathy (mission specialist)
- Michael López-Alegría (mission commander)
