= Axiom Mission 1 =

2022 private crewed spaceflight to the ISS

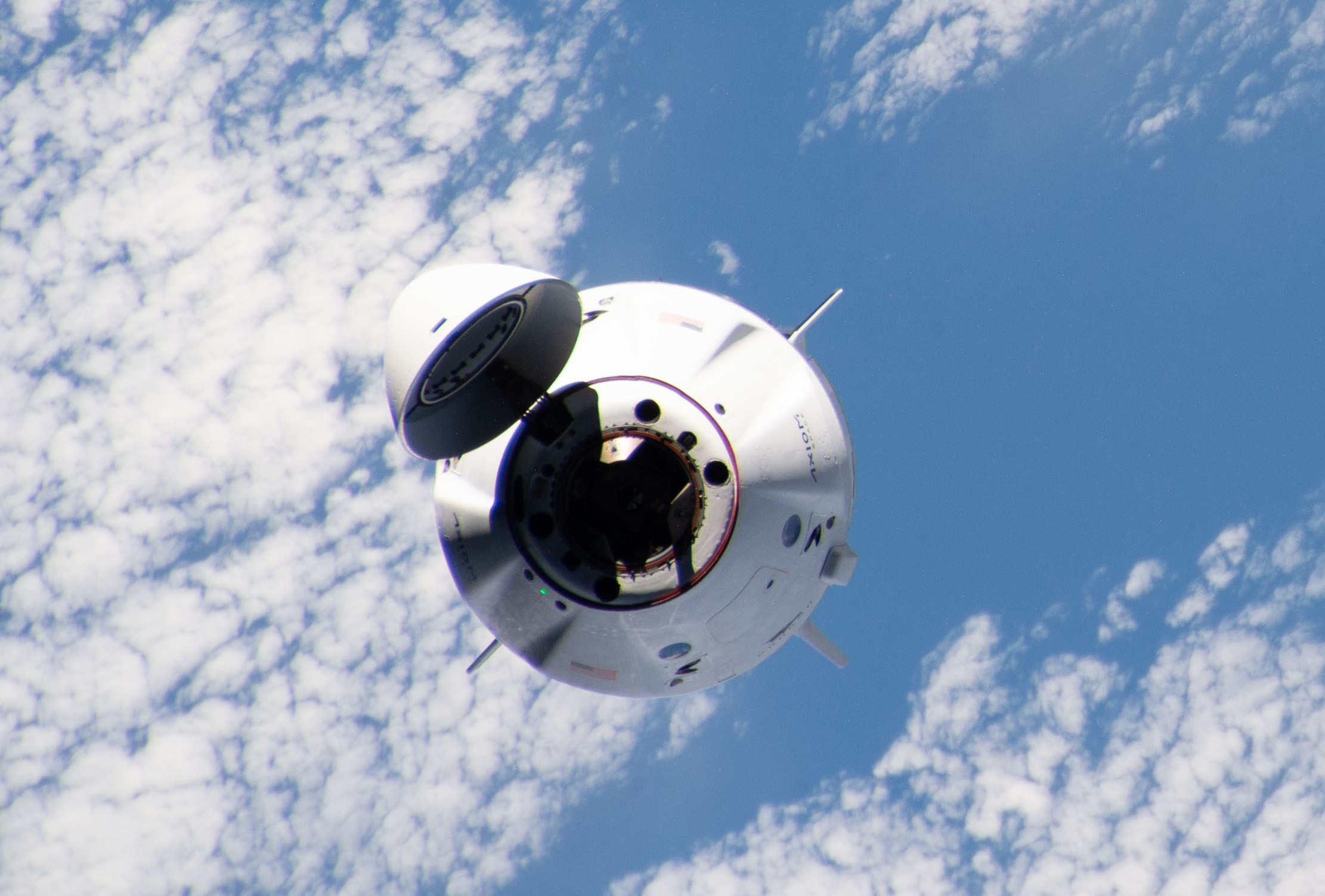
- Ax-1 approaching the ISS
- Names: Ax-1
- Mission type: Private spaceflight to the ISS
- Operator: Axiom Space; SpaceX
- COSPAR ID: 2022-037A
- SATCAT no.: 52204
- Website: axiomspace.com/ax1
- Mission duration: 17 days, 1 hour, 49 minutes

Spacecraft properties
- Spacecraft: Crew Dragon Endeavour
- Spacecraft type: Crew Dragon
- Manufacturer: SpaceX
- Launch mass: 12,519 kg (27,600 lb)
- Landing mass: 9,616 kg (21,200 lb)

Crew
- Crew size: 4
- Members: Michael López-Alegría; Larry Connor; Eytan Stibbe; Mark Pathy

Start of mission
- Launch date: April 8, 2022, 15:17:12 UTC (11:17:12 am EDT)
- Rocket: Falcon 9 Block 5 B1062-5
- Launch site: Kennedy, LC‑39A
- Contractor: SpaceX

End of mission
- Recovered by: MV Megan
- Landing date: April 25, 2022, 17:06 UTC
- Landing site: Atlantic Ocean

Orbital parameters
- Reference system: Geocentric orbit
- Regime: Low Earth orbit
- Inclination: 51.66°

Docking with ISS
- Docking port: Harmony zenith
- Docking date: April 9, 2022, 12:29 UTC
- Undocking date: April 25, 2022, 01:10 UTC
- Time docked: 15 days, 12 hours, 41 minutes
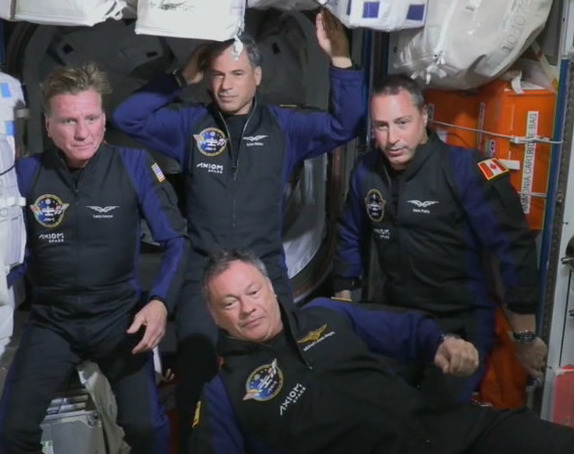
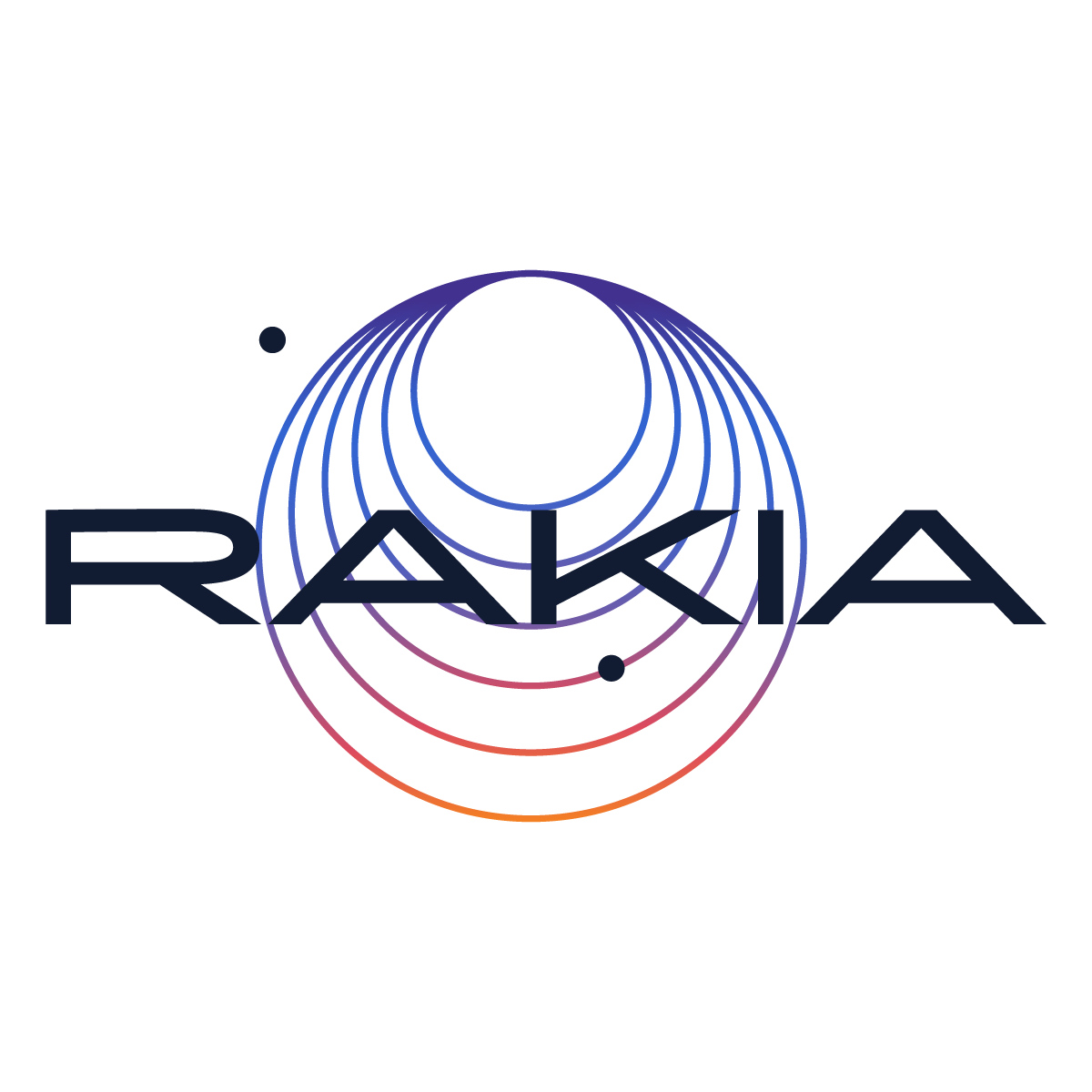
- Axiom Mission 1 patch (left) and the Rakia mission logo (right) Clockwise from left: Connor, Stibbe, Pathy and López-Alegría Axiom Space missions Crew Dragon flights

Axiom Mission 1 (or Ax-1) was a privately funded and operated crewed mission to the International Space Station (ISS). The mission was operated by Axiom Space out of Axiom's Mission Control Center MCC-A in Houston, Texas. The flight launched on April 8, 2022, from Kennedy Space Center in Florida. The spacecraft used was a SpaceX Crew Dragon. The crew consisted of Michael López-Alegría, a Spaniard-American and a professionally trained astronaut hired by Axiom, Eytan Stibbe from Israel, Larry Connor from the United States, and Mark Pathy from Canada.

== Background ==
Axiom Space was founded in 2016 with the goal of creating the world's first commercial space station. In early 2020, NASA announced that Axiom had been granted access to the forward port of the ISS' Harmony module, to which Axiom plans to berth the first node of the Axiom Orbital Segment; a complex that could grow to five pressurized modules after 2024 with a large observation window – similar to the current Cupola mounted on the Nadir side of Tranquility. This new addition to the ISS will be able to facilitate the company's activities in low Earth orbit. Prior to the first module's launch as early as 2024, Axiom planned to organize and fly crewed missions to the ISS, consisting of either paying private astronauts or astronauts from public agencies or private organizations. In March 2020, Axiom announced they would charter a flight to the ISS with SpaceX's Crew Dragon spacecraft as early as late 2021. This mission is the first wholly commercially operated crewed mission to the ISS, and one of the first dedicated orbital private crew missions, alongside Roscosmos' Soyuz MS-20 mission in December 2021. Following their first flight, Axiom plans to offer crewed flights to the ISS as often as twice per year, "aligning with the flight opportunities as they are made available by NASA".

== Crew ==
Michael López-Alegría was chosen as a commercial astronaut. The other three seats were reserved for space tourists, announced to cost US$55 million each.

Following the launch of Crew Dragon Demo-2 in May 2020, the first crewed test flight of Dragon 2, Axiom CEO Michael Suffredini said that they planned to announce the names of the crew in "a month or so"; Ars Technica reported that the full crew complement would "probably be unveiled in January 2021". On January 26, 2021, Axiom revealed the full crew of the mission, consisting of Michael López-Alegría, Larry Connor, Mark Pathy and Eytan Stibbe. They also announced Peggy Whitson as the backup commander for the mission and John Shoffner as backup pilot. Eytan Stibbe's backup was his daughter Dr. Shir Stibbe. Michael Lopez-Alegria is a former NASA astronaut and Axiom Space VP. John Shoffner is an airshow pilot and entrepreneur, and not an Axiom employee nor a government trained astronaut. Peggy Whitson is a former NASA astronaut and Axiom consultant.

It was reported that actor Tom Cruise and film producer Doug Liman would be passengers for a movie project, but it was later announced that they would fly on a subsequent flight.

Prime crew
| Position | Astronaut |
|---|---|
| Commander | Michael López-Alegría, Axiom Space; Fifth spaceflight |
| Pilot | Larry Connor; First spaceflight Space tourist |
| Mission specialist | Eytan Stibbe; First spaceflight Space tourist |
| Mission specialist | Mark Pathy; First spaceflight Space tourist |

Backup crew
| Position | Astronaut |
|---|---|
| Commander | Peggy Whitson, Axiom Space |
| Pilot | John Shoffner; Space tourist |
| Mission specialist | Shir Stibbe; Space tourist |

== Mission ==
The mission launched at 11:17 EDT on April 8, 2022. It launched atop a Falcon 9 Block 5 launch vehicle from Kennedy Space Center's Launch Complex 39A (LC-39A), a NASA-owned launch pad leased to SpaceX for Falcon 9 launches. The mission was flown aboard Crew Dragon Endeavour, which previously supported the Crew Dragon Demo-2 and SpaceX Crew-2 missions. From there the spacecraft spent less than a day in transit to the station and dock with Harmony, where they were planned to spend ten days aboard the International Space Station (ISS). Following their time on the ISS, the spacecraft undocked with plans to return to Earth via a splashdown in the Atlantic Ocean. Bad weather in the landing zone delayed the return, as result the crew spent 16 days docked to the ISS for a total of 17 days in orbit.

It was revealed that the "zero-g indicator" aboard the first private mission to visit the International Space Station was a toy dog called Caramel, the mascot for the Montreal Children's Hospital Foundation.

During their days aboard the ISS, the private crew conducted more than 25 different research experiments.

Connor also carried aboard three items on behalf of the Armstrong Air & Space Museum. With Connor being an Ohio-native, the items included a John Glenn senatorial campaign button, a patch of the Armstrong Air & Space Museum, and a piece of Kapton foil removed from the Apollo 11 Command Module after splashdown.

== Rakia ==
The Israeli mission segment was the Rakia Mission, meaning "sky" in Hebrew and is also the title of the book published with Ilan Ramon's diary fragments that survived the 2003 Space Shuttle Columbia disaster. The mission carried both experiments and an art piece by Udi Edelman and Hadas Gur-Arie. Israeli artists contributed 15 works inspired by space exploration and designed to function in or react to microgravity, exploring the intersection of human creativity and the space environment.

=== Experiments ===
The Rakia mission carried dozens of scientific experiments and technological demonstrations. A science committee that included leading figures in Israeli academia, led by Inbal Kreiss, selected projects from diverse fields such as medicine, astrophysics, and agriculture. Some experiments included:

- Fluidic Telescope (FLUTE): The Technion in collaboration with NASA's Ames Research Center to test the production of high-quality optical lenses in microgravity by shaping liquid polymers. This experiment demonstrated the potential for manufacturing large-scale telescopes in space.
- ILAN-ES: An atmospheric research project focused on observing Transient Luminous Events (TLEs) that are short-lived, high-altitude electrical breakdown phenomena that occur far above normal thunderstorm clouds and lightning from space. The experiment builds on the legacy of the MEIDEX project conducted by Ilan Ramon aboard Space Shuttle Columbia (STS-107) in 2003. Following its success on Ax-1, ILAN-ES became a recurring payload on subsequent missions, including Ax-2 and Ax-3. For the Ax-4 mission, the project evolved into the UHU experiment, an international collaboration with the Hungarian Space Program (HUNOR).
- Brain.space: A study of electrical brain activity (EEG) to monitor cognitive function and neural changes in astronauts, providing data on how the brain adapts to microgravity.
- CRISPR Diagnosis: A proof-of-concept for using gene-editing technology for the rapid detection of pathogens in space, essential for long-term Lunar or other deep space missions.
- AstroRad Radiation Vest: A test of the StemRad-developed protective suit designed to shield astronauts from cosmic radiation. Stibbe wore the vest during daily activities to evaluate its ergonomics and comfort for future space missions. The vest was successfully tested on the lunar Artemis 1 mission around the moon, in November 2022.
- Flexible Antenna (NSLComm): A technological demonstration of a deployable, fabric-based antenna designed to enable high-bandwidth communications for nano-satellites. The experiment successfully validated the antenna's deployment mechanism in microgravity.

=== Legacy ===
After Rakia's stay on the ISS concluded Rakia transitioned into a Public Benefit Company (PBC) focused on the long-term development of the Israeli space ecosystem. The organization facilitates access to microgravity research for entrepreneurs and researchers while aligning Israeli technology with international exploration goals, including the Artemis program. Notable projects post-mission include:

- Israel Space Forum: Rakia established this collaborative platform to unite space-tech companies, government agencies, and academic researchers. The forum aims to accelerate technological growth within the global NewSpace economy and coordinate Israeli contributions to future lunar and Martian missions.
- Space Campus IL: The organization leads Israel's first student space community, which connects university students with industry professionals. This initiative focuses on developing the next generation of space professionals through academic collaborations and specialized training programs.
- Cultural and Artistic Initiatives: Rakia continues to manage a cultural branch that grew from the Ax-1 mission. This includes curating art exhibitions designed for space, hosting conferences on the intersection of humanity and technology, and promoting "Space for All" through public outreach.
- Educational Leadership: The mission's long-term impact on global space education was highlighted in 2025 with the appointment of Eytan Stibbe as Chancellor of the International Space University (ISU).
- International collaborations: During Axiom Mission 4 (Ax-4), Rakia collaborated on international educational and space-related initiatives connected to the mission and its participating astronauts, including Indian astronaut Shubhanshu Shukla. As part of the mission, Rakia and the HUNOR Hungarian Space Program also collaborated on the UHU (Upper Atmosphere – Hungarian Universe) experiment conducted aboard the International Space Station.

== Gallery ==
Axiom Mission 1
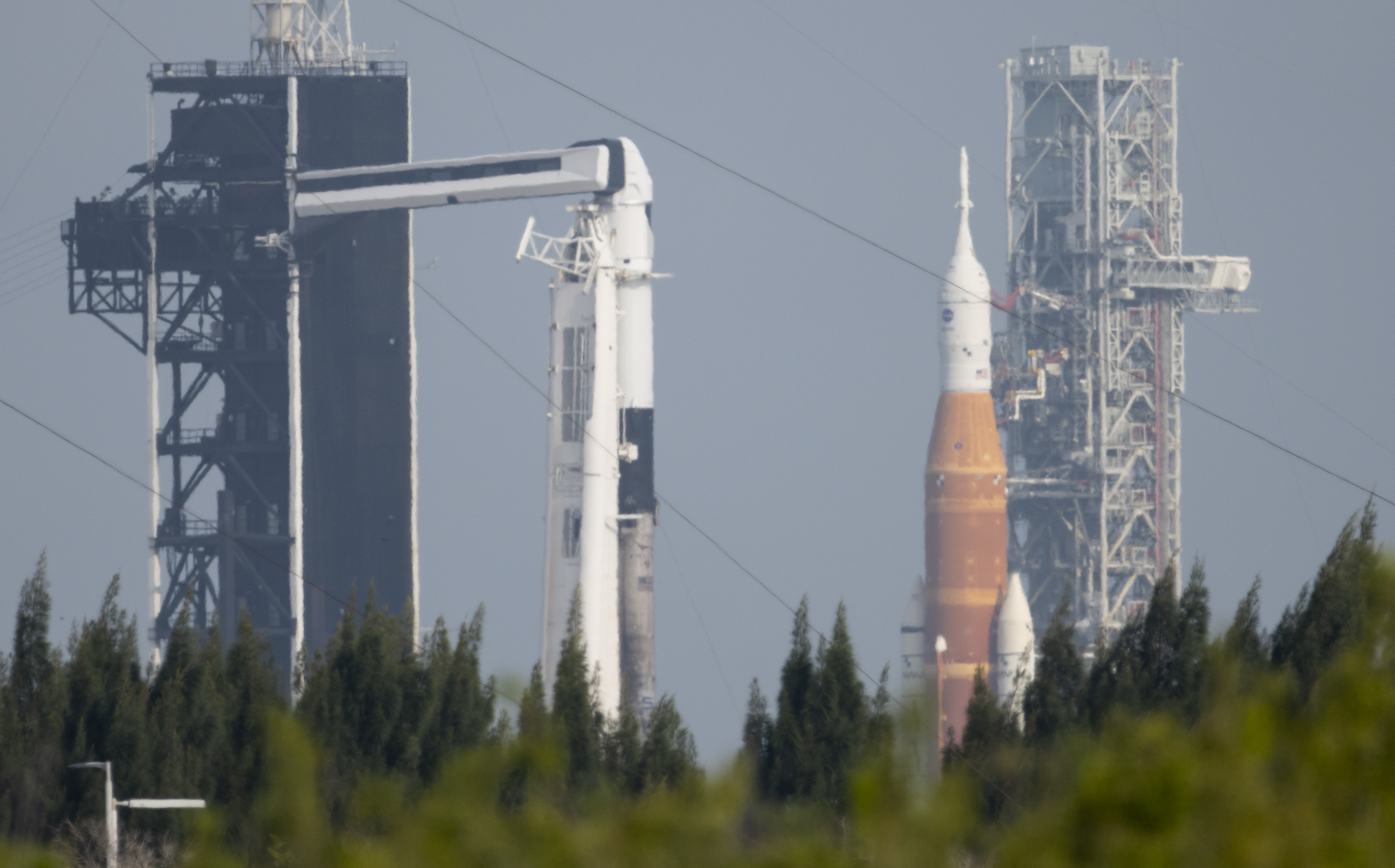
Ax-1 and Artemis 1 on adjacent pads before launch

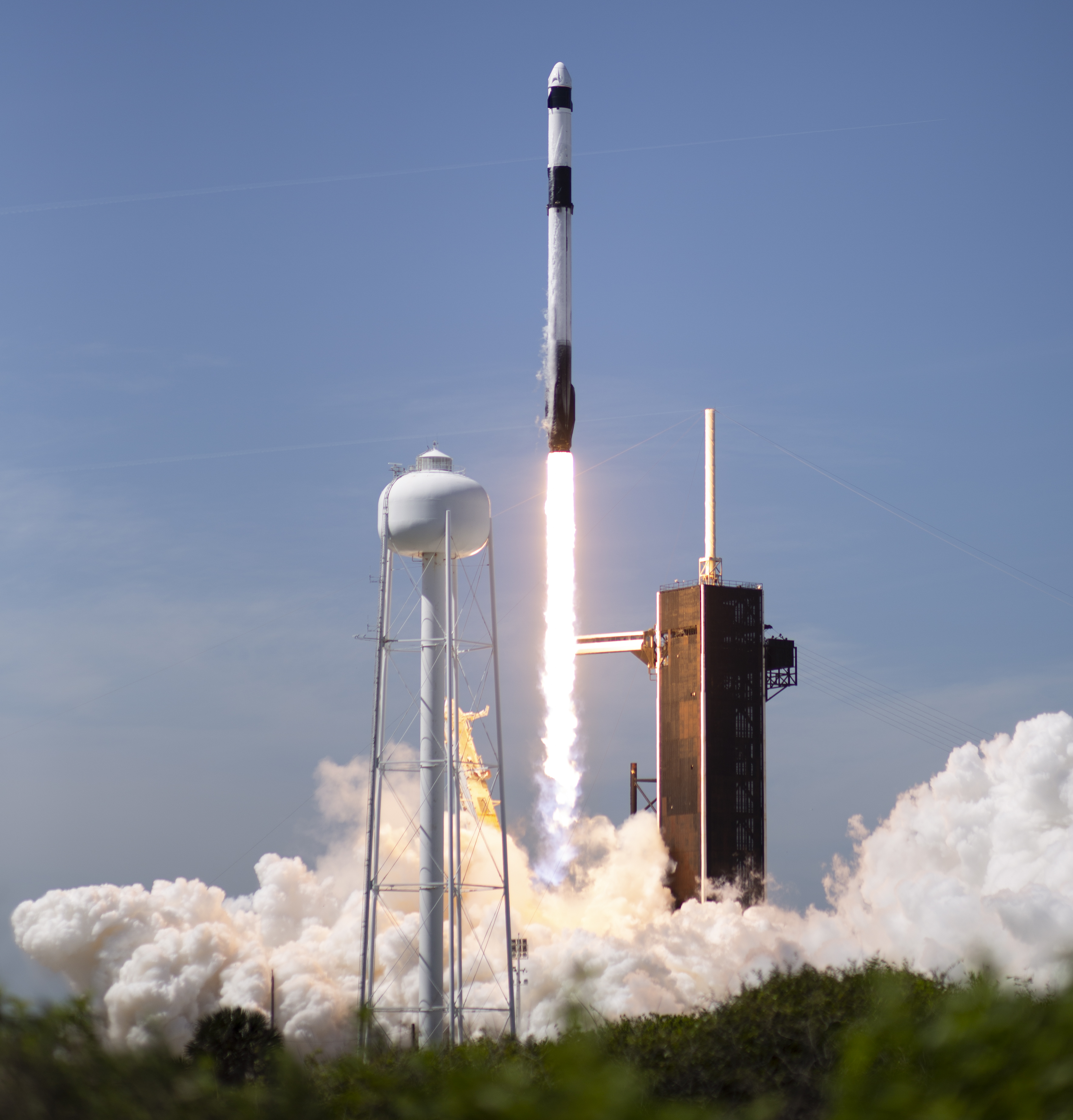
Launch of Ax-1

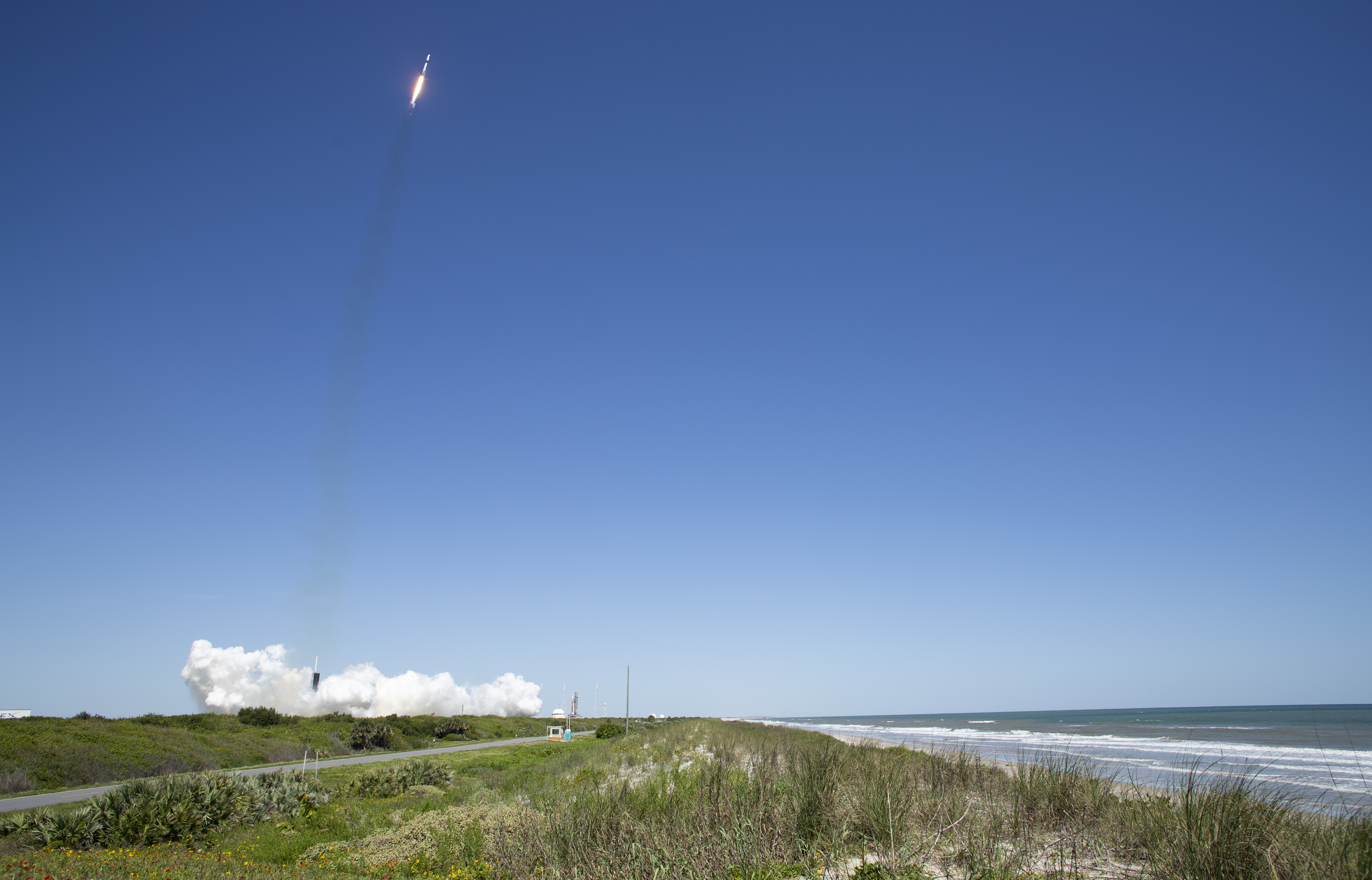
Falcon 9 and Ax-1 pitching downrange

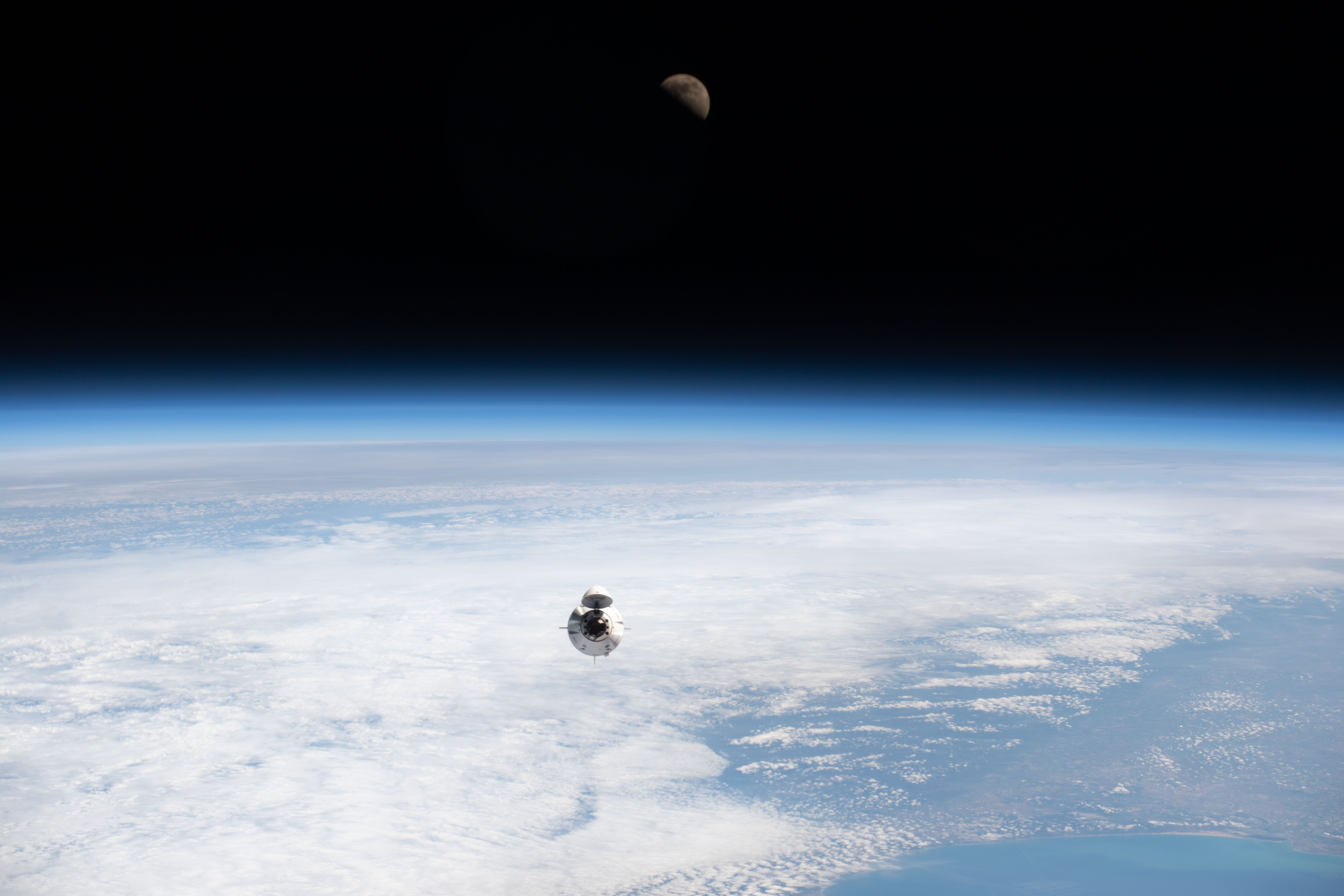
Ax-1 approaching the ISS

== See also ==
- Expedition 67
- Axiom Orbital Segment
- Axiom Mission 2
- Axiom Mission 3
- List of Dragon 2 flights
- List of human spaceflights to the International Space Station
- Space Adventures Crew Dragon mission
- Inspiration4
- Timeline of private spaceflight
