= Space Hero =

Reality television program

Space Hero is an upcoming reality television show where contestants can win a trip to space. Space Hero was founded by Deborah Sass and Thomas Reemer. In 2020, NASA confirmed it was in discussions regarding the show. Sass and Reemer are said to be hoping the show will encourage interest in privatized space travel. The show is being developed with support from spaceflight company Axiom Space. 24 contestants from any country in the world will be selected. The gender ratio will be half male and half female, with the same ratio for those contestants from emerging and developing countries.

== Development ==
The show is currently in pre-production, and will take on a reality television show format with 24 contestants who will compete for a grand prize of free travel into space. In 2021, Miriam Kramer of Axios News noted co-founder Sass intended for the program to open up for contestant applications "in the next six to eight months". The contestants have yet to be confirmed. In March 2022, Reemer and Sass announced a partnership with a digital media company, One Digital Entertainment, to commence "product strategy, regional development, media allowances and brand marketing for the world's first ever global casting show".
