= Bioz =

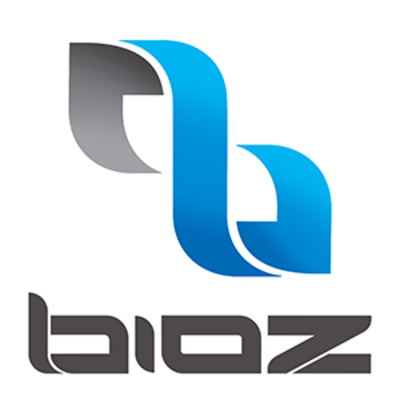
- Website type: AI platform for life science researchers
- Founded: July 2013; 13 years ago
- Headquarters: Los Altos, California, {{{location_country}}}
- Area served: Worldwide
- Founders: Karin Lachmi and Daniel Levitt
- Key people: Daniel Levitt CEO; Karin Lachmi CSO
- Industry: Internet
- Services: Search engine for researchers in biopharma and academia
- Website: www.bioz.com
- Current status: Active

Bioz is a search engine for life science experimentation.

== History ==
Bioz was founded by Karin Lachmi and Daniel Levitt. Lachmi is a scientist who completed her postdoc in molecular and cellular biology at the Stanford University School of Medicine. During her lab work she found little available data regarding preferable lab tools, reagents and related products for experimentation. There are 50,000 vendors selling 300 million scientific products. She decided to start the company in order to provide researchers with adequate information for that purpose. Co-founder Daniel Levitt is an entrepreneur who sold his company WebAppoint to Microsoft in the year 2000. He also co-founded the company StemRad. At Bioz, Lachmi serves as the Chief Scientific Officer and Levitt serves as the chief executive officer. Bioz claims to have over a million researcher-users from 196 countries. Among the investors are Esther Dyson and the Stanford-StartX Fund.

The company's advisory board includes Nobel Laureates in Chemistry Michael Levitt, Roger Kornberg, and Ada Yonath.

== Technology ==
The company uses artificial intelligence, machine learning and natural language processing in order to extract experimentation data from scientific articles, such as the products that researchers used, the companies that supply the products, the protocol conditions that researchers selected, and the types of experiments and techniques. The algorithm ranks products based on how frequently they were used by researchers in their experiments, how recently a product was used, and the impact factor of the journal. The algorithm's output is a Bioz stars score for each product that was mentioned in an article. Bioz is a data-driven platform for product recommendations, which is contrary to platforms such as TripAdvisor and OpenTable that are based on user-generated reviews and ratings. The recommendations and scoring system that the company has developed are meant to assist researchers with the process of developing future medications and finding cures for diseases. They are guided towards products and techniques that were previously used by other researchers when planning and performing experiments. The company's revenue is based on selling SaaS subscriptions to researchers in biopharma companies. They also charge product suppliers for content syndication.
