= Intuitive Machines =

American aerospace company

Intuitive Machines, Inc.
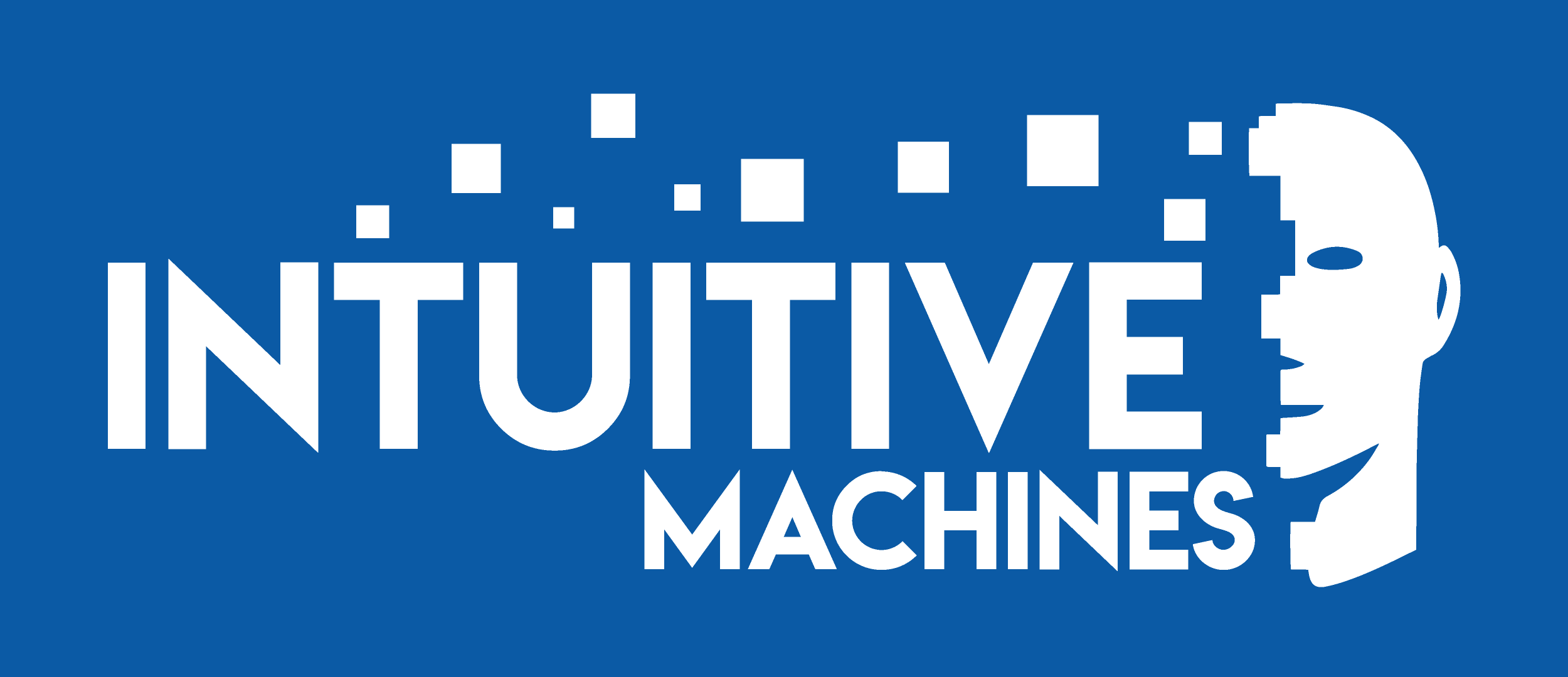

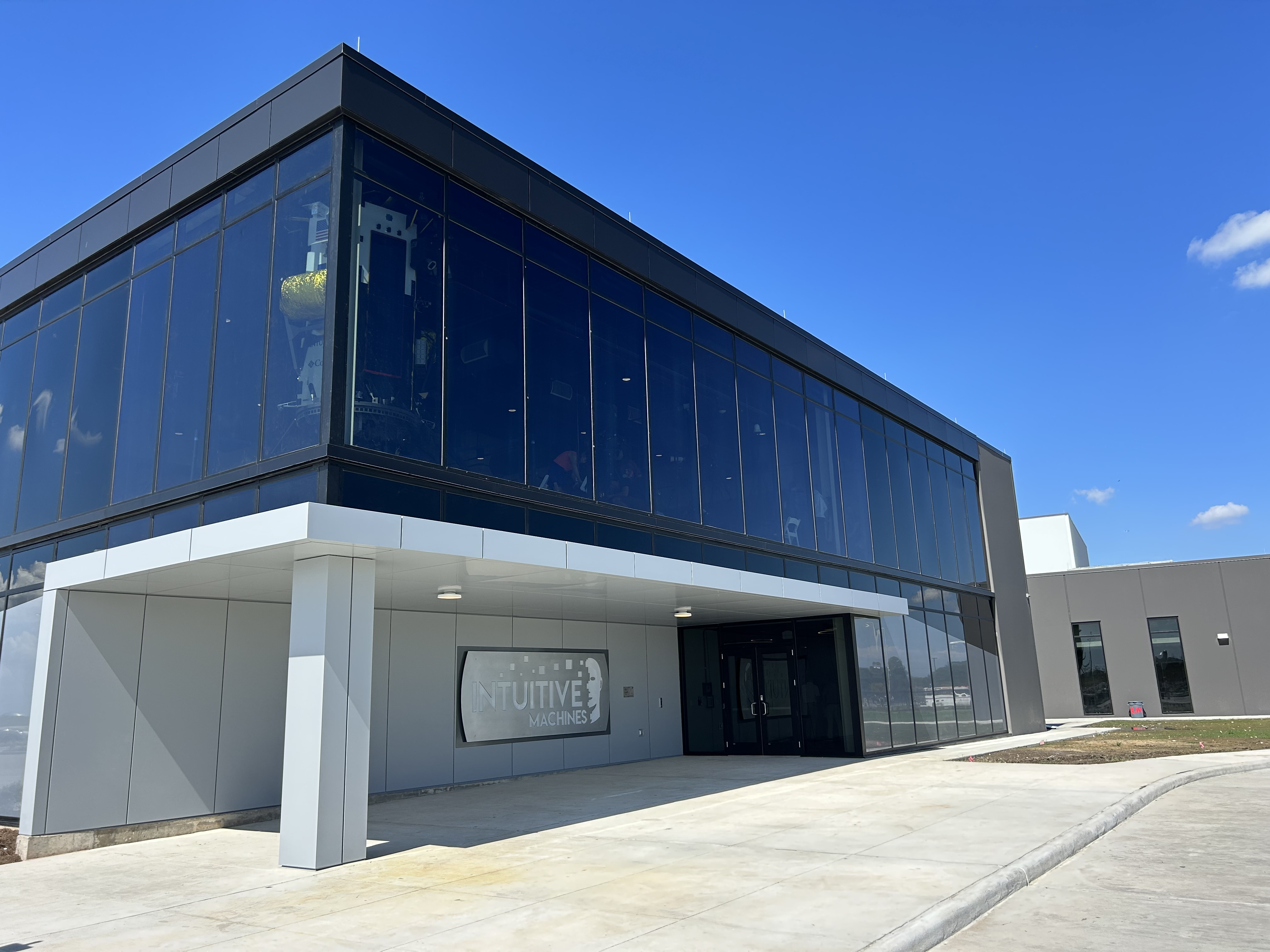
- Lunar Operations Facility at Houston Spaceport
- Type: Public
- Traded as: Nasdaq: LUNR
- Industry: Aerospace
- Founded: 2013; 13 years ago
- Founders: Steve Altemus; Kam Ghaffarian; Tim Crain
- Headquarters: Houston, Texas, U.S.
- Key people: Kam Ghaffarian (chairman); Steve Altemus (president and CEO)
- Products: Lunar lander, Mission Control Center, Ground stations, additive manufacturing
- Revenue: 292 millions $ (2025)
- Number of employees: 400 (2024)
- Website: intuitivemachines.com

Intuitive Machines, Inc. is an American space exploration company headquartered in Houston, Texas. It was founded in 2013 by Stephen Altemus, Kam Ghaffarian, and Tim Crain, to provide commercial and government exploration of the Moon. Today the company offers lunar surface access for transportation and payload delivery, data transmission services, and infrastructure-as-a-service. NASA has awarded Intuitive Machines five lunar surface delivery task orders through its Commercial Lunar Payload Services (CLPS) initiative. In 2021 Northrop Grumman announced they would team with Lunar Outpost, Intuitive Machines and Michelin to design a Lunar Terrain Vehicle.

Intuitive Machines, LLC, went public in February 2023 after merging with Inflection Point Acquisition Corp., a special-purpose acquisition company. The company is incorporated in Delaware, and trades on the Nasdaq under the ticker symbol, LUNR.

Intuitive Machines' Lunar Payload Delivery Services (LPDS) program seeks to open commercial access to the Moon. NASA selected Intuitive Machines' LPDS program for four lunar missions. In February 2024, Intuitive Machines' Odysseus lander experienced a soft but unstable landing on the lunar surface, ultimately tipping over and receiving minimal data from payloads before entirely losing communications. Despite not meeting many mission objectives, Odysseus is the first American spacecraft to land on the surface of the Moon since the Apollo Program, and the mission is considered a partial success by most industry experts. The next Intuitive Machines' lunar mission (IM-2 and the Athena lander) in March 2025 suffered the same fate as its predecessor, tipping over due to problems with the lander's laser altimeter.

== History ==
Intuitive Machines, Inc. was founded in 2013 by Stephen Altemus, Kam Ghaffarian, and Tim Crain, to provide commercial and government exploration of the Moon. It is incorporated in Delaware, and headquartered in Houston, Texas.

Intuitive Machines merged with the special-purpose acquisition company (SPAC) Inflection Point Acquisition Corp. (IPAX) to become a publicly held company, a transaction that was completed on February 14, 2023, and its stock began trading on the Nasdaq that day.

On November 4, 2025, the company announced that it would buy Lanteris Space Systems from Advent International in a transaction worth $800 million.

== Company overview ==
Intuitive Machines provides infrastructure as a service and is the catalyst for growing a lunar economy by using three pillars of commercialization: Transportation and delivery of payloads (satellites, scientific instruments, cargo), including rideshare delivery and lunar surface access; collection, processing, and interpretation of space-based data, through command, control, communications, reconnaissance, and prospecting; and infrastructure on the lunar surface, including space assets to perform tasks and make decisions without human intervention. These functions may include navigation, maintenance, scientific data collection, and system health monitoring.

=== Nova-C ===
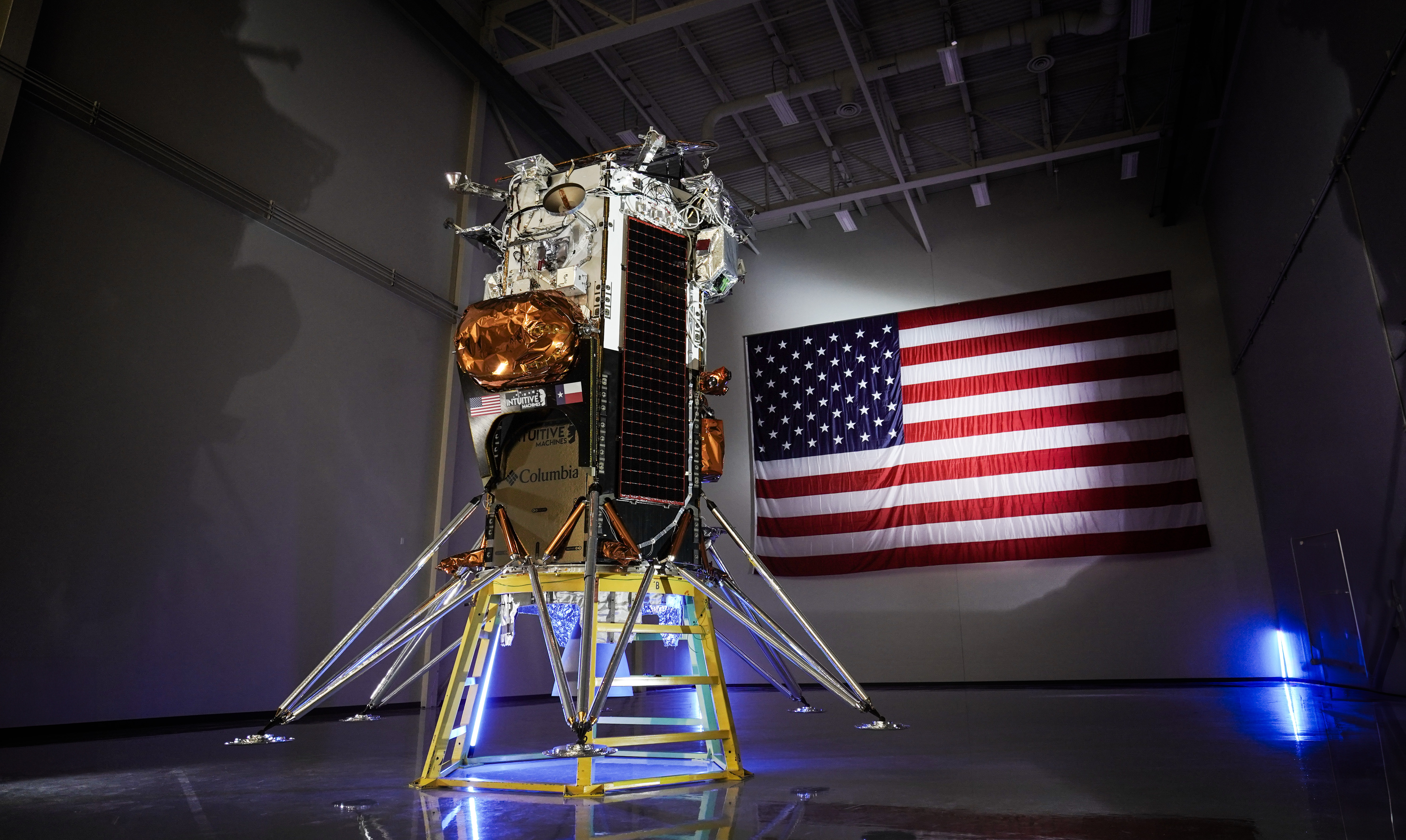
Intuitive Machines' Nova-C lunar lander

In November 2018, IM was selected by NASA as one of nine companies to bid on the Commercial Lunar Payload Services program (CLPS). Their lander, Nova-C, was NASA CLPS first mission of the program, focused on the exploration and use of natural resources of the Moon.

On May 31, 2019, NASA announced it had awarded Intuitive Machines $77 million to build and launch their Nova-C Moon lander.

On April 13, 2020, IM, under contract to carry NASA science instruments to the Moon on a robotic spacecraft, said that its first lunar mission would target a deep, narrow valley named Vallis Schröteri. The mission objective was to place the Nova-C lander at crater Malapert A, near the south pole of the Moon.

=== Missions ===
==== IM-1 ====
An Intuitive Machines contract with NASA covered transportation to and operations on the Moon, for five NASA science instruments and several commercial payloads (including Columbia Sportswear). The company launched its first mission based on the contract, with one of its Nova-C class landers spending seven days traveling to the Moon. On February 22, 2024, Intuitive Machines' Odysseus lander experienced a hard landing on the lunar surface, ultimately tipping over and receiving minimal data from payloads before entirely losing communications. Despite the failure to meet many mission objectives, Odysseus is considered the first American spacecraft to land on the surface of the Moon since the Apollo Program. The lander survived for six days total.

The Odysseus lander fell on its side when landing, but its instruments remained partially functional (albeit with a reduced downlink capacity), so the mission was judged a success by Intuitive Machines and the sponsoring customer, NASA.

==== IM-2 ====
IM-2 Athena was launched on February 27, 2025, carrying Micro-Nova Gracie and other rovers and payloads. This mission is designed to validate water hunting infrastructure (e.g., via its drill), and essential mobility services like its Micro-Nova hopper; the hopper is designed to deploy off the lander and prospect by hopping across the lunar surface. IM-2 Athena has completed its propulsion system's hot fire test, the most complex integrated test of the lander thus far.

The Athena lander achieved soft landing on March 6, 2025, but landed on its side, precluding recharging and deployment of payloads. Operations concluded March 7, 2025, less than 13 hours after the hard landing. On March 13, Intuitive Machines shared that, like on the IM-1 mission, the Athena's altimeter had failed during landing, leaving its onboard computer without an accurate altitude reading. As a result, the spacecraft struck a plateau, tipped over, and skidded across the lunar surface, rolling once or twice before settling inside a crater. The company's CEO compared it to a baseball player sliding into a base. The impact also kicked up regolith that coated the solar panels in dust, further degrading their performance.

==== IM-3 ====
The third lunar delivery mission is undergoing integrated vibration testing with an anticipated mission window in early 2026. This planned mission is designed to deploy the first of five data relay satellites under a Near Space Network Services contract.

==== IM-4 ====
The fourth surface delivery mission will also deliver IM's next two data relay satellites. This south pole mission includes six NASA CLPS payloads. Among those, the Prospect drill suite (led by the European Space Agency) will search for water ice. IM-4 will also carry the RISE regolith experiment from JAXA.

==== IM-5 ====
The first surface delivery mission to use the larger Nova-D lander, the fifth mission will deliver significantly more cargo then previous missions which used the Nova-C lander. The Lunar south pole mission targeting Mons Malapert will noticeably carry two lunar rovers, the Australian Space Agency's Roo-ver, and Honeybee Robotic's Lunar Rover.

==== NSNS ====
Intuitive Machines became the sole awardee for the Near Space Network Services (NSNS) relay services contract in September 2024. Relay services would assist communications and navigation for Moon-based missions. Launch of the first relay services satellite is planned for IM-3, and two more are planned for launch with IM-4.

== SPAC merger ==
In September 2022, Intuitive Machines announced that it would merge into special-purpose acquisition company (SPAC) Inflection Point Acquisition Corp. (IPAX) and incorporate as a publicly held company. The transaction was approved by IPAX's shareholders on February 8, 2023, and the business combination was completed six days later.

The stock of the newly named Intuitive Machines, Inc., began trading on the Nasdaq exchange on February 14, 2023.

== Project Morpheus heritage and evolution ==
Project Morpheus was a NASA project that in 2010 began to develop a landing test vehicle similar to the IM Nova-C. Tim Crain had worked on the project and later became the CTO of Intuitive Machines. In an interview with NASA recorded in October 2023, Crain mentioned the possible development of a Nova-D lander.
