= Mark Pathy =

Canadian astronaut, businessman and philanthropist (born 1969)

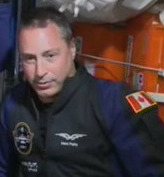
- Born: 1969 (age 56–57)
- Space career
- Time in space: 17 days, 1 hour and 48 minutes
- Missions: Axiom Mission 1

Mark Pathy (born July 1969) is a Canadian businessman, philanthropist and commercial astronaut. He is the CEO of Mavrik, a privately owned Canadian investment company. He is also the chairman of Stingray Group and the former co-CEO of Fednav, a private shipping company co-founded by his great-uncle, Ernest Pathy, who was an immigrant from Hungary.

== Biography ==
His mother Constance was born in the Netherlands while his father, Laurence Pathy, was born in Egypt to Hungarian parents and is a close friend and former business partner of Paul Martin. His father is also a cousin of Mariette Pathy Allen.

He grew up in Montreal and attended Selwyn House School, where he was classmates with politician Greg Fergus and businessmen Vincenzo Guzzo and Michael Penner. He has an undergraduate degree from the University of Toronto and an MBA from INSEAD.

The Pathy Family Foundation, which he serves as secretary, had more than $252 million CAD in assets as of 2018. Mark Pathy and his wife Jessica contributed to a fundraising campaign for the Montreal Jewish General Hospital (JGH) Foundation which raised $5.5 million to date and saw the recently created Centre of Excellence in Infectious Diseases named in their honour. The JGH’s Jess and Mark Pathy Centre of Excellence in Infectious Diseases focuses on advancing knowledge of antibiotics and vaccines; preventing infections; developing rapid diagnostics and mapping the molecular structure of infections.

In 2026, Mark Pathy donated $15 million to Concordia University for the creation of the Mark Pathy Space Institute at the Gina Cody School of Engineering and Computer Science. The institute's goal is to train the next generation of space engineers, commercialize new technologies, and expand Canada’s role in the global space economy.

== Spaceflight ==
In January 2021, it was announced that Pathy paid for a seat on board SpaceX Axiom Space-1 as a mission specialist alongside Larry Connor, Eytan Stibbe and Michael López-Alegría. The mission launched on April 8, 2022. He received his astronaut pin during the welcoming ceremony at the ISS, 584th space traveller in the world. Mark Pathy paid $50 million USD for the trip. He became the third Canadian private citizen, after Guy Laliberté and William Shatner, and 12th Canadian overall in space. The Ax-1 mission saw Pathy take part in over a dozen research projects on board involving Canadian universities as well as the Montreal Children's Hospital Research Institute.

== See also ==
- Canadian astronauts

SpaceX Axiom Space-1 space travellers

- Larry Connor (US - pilot)
- Eytan Stibbe (Israeli - mission specialist)
- Michael López-Alegría (US - commander)
