= Axiom Space =

Private American aerospace company

Axiom Space, Inc.
- Type: Private incorporated company
- Industry: Aerospace
- Founded: 2016; 10 years ago
- Founder: Michael T. Suffredini; Kam Ghaffarian
- Headquarters: Houston, Texas, United States
- Key people: Jonathan W. Cirtain (CEO); Kam Ghaffarian (Executive Chairman); Michael Lopez-Alegria; Peggy Whitson; Koichi Wakata
- Services: Human spaceflight; In-space research and manufacturing
- Revenue: 400,000,000 United States dollar (2023)
- Total assets: 717,000,000 United States dollar (2025)
- Number of employees: 790 (2023)
- Website: axiomspace.com

Axiom Space, Inc., is an American privately funded space infrastructure developer headquartered in Houston, Texas.

Founded in 2016 by Michael T. Suffredini and Kam Ghaffarian, the company first flew a spaceflight in 2022: Axiom Mission 1, the first commercially crewed private spaceflight to the International Space Station (ISS). The company aims to own and operate a modular commercial space station in the late 2020s. The company's employees include astronauts Michael Lopez-Alegria, Peggy Whitson, and Koichi Wakata.

The company sent its first commercial astronauts into orbit in 2022. It also plans human spaceflight for government-funded and commercial astronauts engaging in in-space research, in-space manufacturing, and space exploration.

== History ==
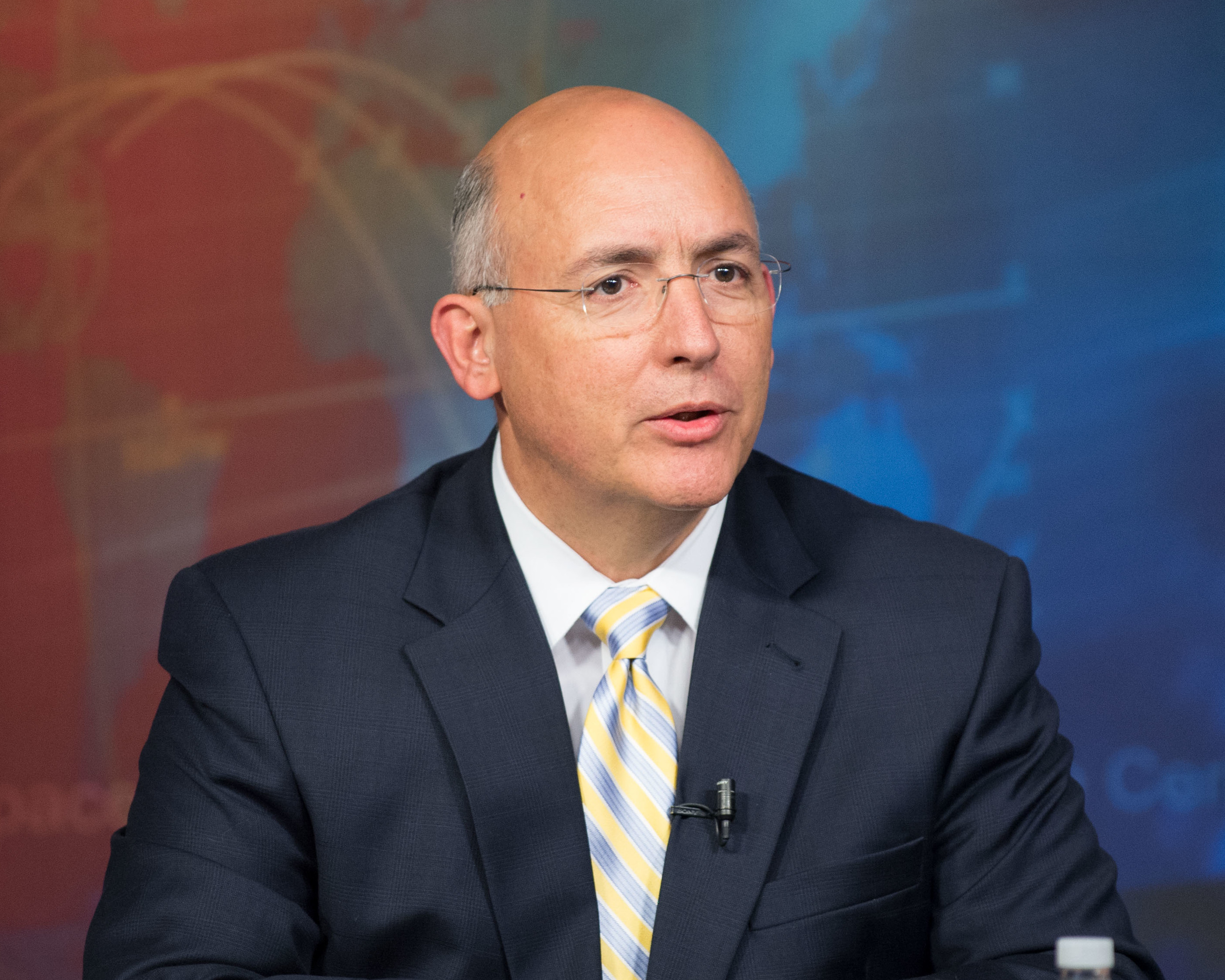
Michael Suffredini in 2012

Former Axiom Space CEO Michael T. Suffredini was previously the program manager for the International Space Station (ISS) from 2005 to 2015. After retiring from NASA, Suffredini and Kam Ghaffarian started Axiom Space to target the emerging commercial spaceflight market. Ghaffarian is an engineer and entrepreneur who sold his company, Stinger Ghaffarian Technologies, Inc., a large NASA contractor, to KBR in 2018. Ghaffarian is also the Executive Chairman of Quantum Space.

The company was selected by NASA to provide the first commercial destination module on the ISS. Axiom Space also announced in March 2020 a contract with SpaceX to fly commercial astronauts to the ISS via Falcon 9 and Crew Dragon scheduled for March 2022; the launch took place on April 8, 2022 and the crew returned on April 25.

The company had 110 employees as of February 2021, with offices located in Houston and Los Angeles.

In December 2025, Axiom Space signed a definitive agreement for a $100 million equity investment from the Hungarian firm 4iG Group. The capital increase, structured in two tranches through March 2026, established 4iG as an anchor investor and the first Hungarian company to hold an ownership stake in the firm. The partnership is intended to support the development of Axiom Station and its role in the space-based data economy, including collaboration on an Orbital Data Center for in-orbit data processing.

== NASA contract for ISS modules ==
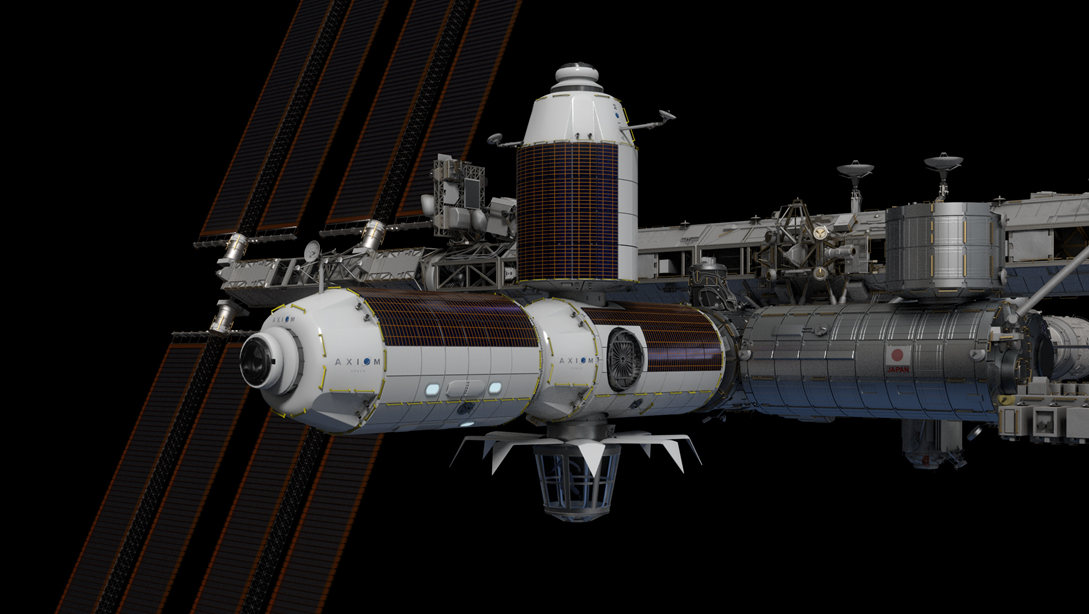
Artist's rendering of an early Axiom Space plan for multiple modules connected to ISS

In 2020, as part of the broader Next Space Technologies for Exploration Partnerships (NextSTEP) cislunar initiative, NASA awarded Axiom a US$140 million contract to provide at least one habitable spacecraft to attach to the ISS. Axiom Space was the only selected proposal from the solicitation process due in 2019. Bigelow Aerospace did not submit a proposal and has subsequently ceased operations.

The modules constructed by Axiom Space are designed to commercially provide services and products in the low Earth orbit economy. The "Axiom Segment" of the station was planned, as of January 2020, to include a node module to act as a connector, a research and manufacturing facility, a crew habitat, and a "large-windowed" module for viewing the Earth. In December 2024, Axiom Space revised their station assembly plans to require only the first module, the Payload Power Thermal Module (PPTM), to dock with the ISS before separating in 2028 to join with the Habitat One (Hab-1) module in a separate orbit.

== Axiom Station ==
Before the ISS is retired in 2030, the company plans to assemble and operate an independent space station, Axiom Station. Axiom Space plans to have the modules individually launched and assembled in orbit, with the first attaching to the ISS. The company is currently targeting 2027 for the launch of its first module, PPTM, and the late-2020s to early-2030s for station completion. Following the launch of the second module, Hab-1, and the separation of PPTM from the ISS to join with Hab-1, Axiom Station will function as an independent free-flying space station. As of December 2024, five modules are manifested on Axiom Station's assembly roadmap.

Axiom Space plans to conduct astronaut training for commercial astronauts, to host governments and commercial partners. The first module is expected to dock to one of two ISS ports currently used for cargo spacecraft. Canadarm2 may continue its operations on Axiom Station after the retirement of the ISS.

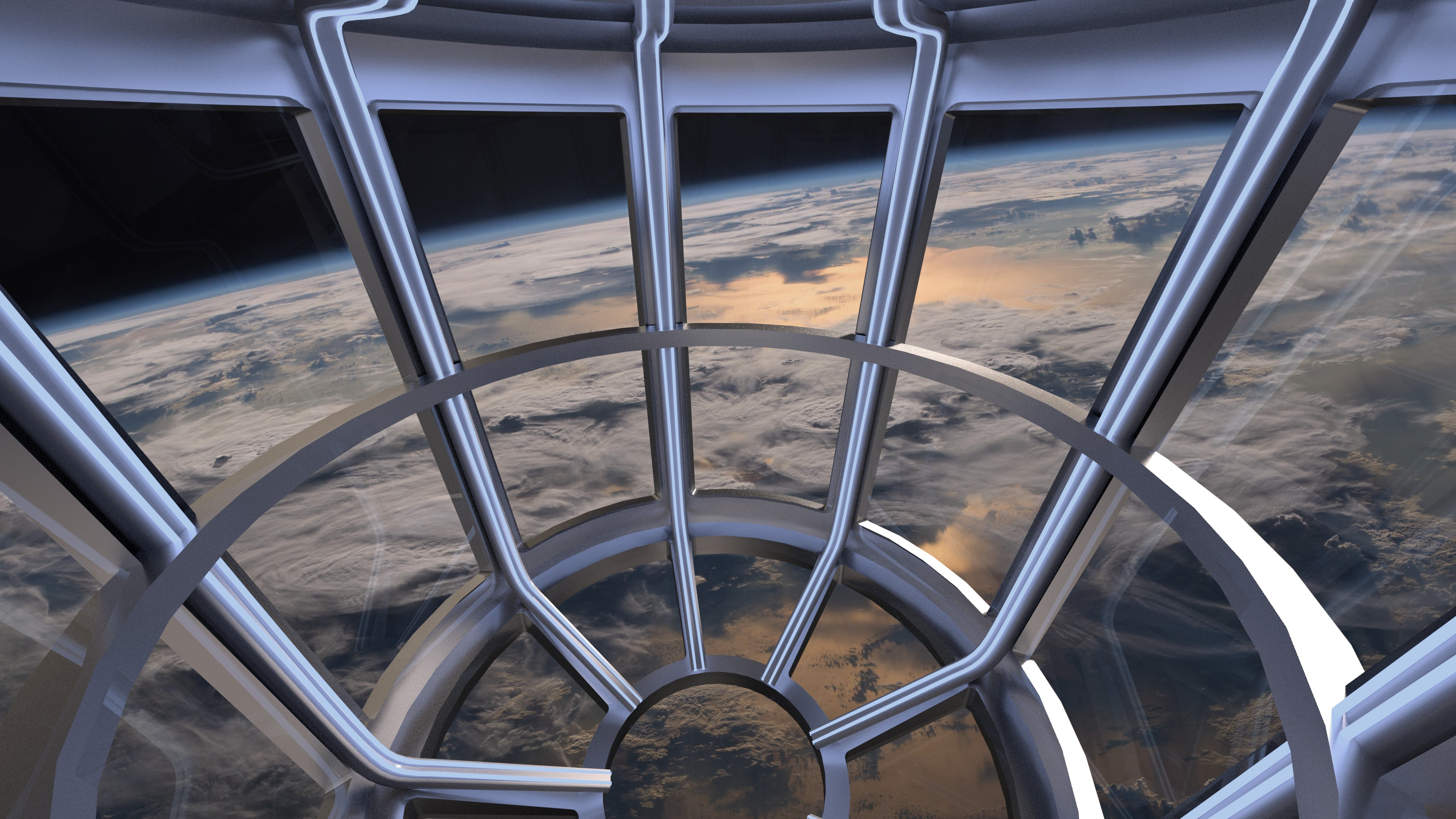
The Future Axiom Earth Observatory interior (Artist's illustration of the model designed by Philippe Starck)

The interior of Axiom Station was designed in 2018 by French architect Philippe Starck. Renderings of the habitat show a chamber with walls that are covered with tufted padding and studded with hundreds of colour-changing LEDs. Axiom Space has publicly stated an intent to maintain at least one astronaut in the station continuously, who will be assigned to take care of research projects and station repairs. This includes amenities like high-speed Wi-Fi, video screens, picture windows, and a glass-walled cupola.

== Human spaceflight ==
Axiom Space provides human spaceflight services to people, corporations, and space agencies. Missions to the International Space Station are offered by Axiom Space, with a 10-day mission including 15 weeks of training. In addition to training, Axiom Space states that the packages include mission planning, hardware development, life support, medical support, crew provisions, hardware and safety certifications, on-orbit operations, and mission management. Missions could extend for longer periods depending on the focus of the spaceflight. Former NASA astronauts Peggy Whitson and Michael López-Alegría are employees and serve as commanders of missions.

In June 2020, NASA Administrator Jim Bridenstine said NASA was involved with the filming of a Tom Cruise movie to the ISS with SpaceX expected to be the transportation partner for the flights.

== In-space research and manufacturing ==
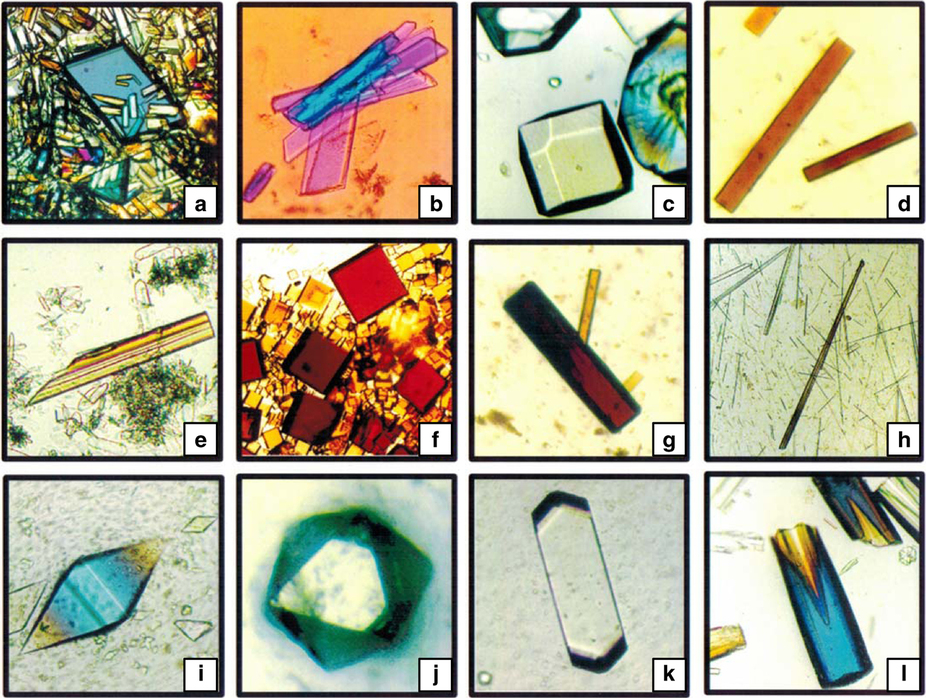
Crystals grown in microgravity

Axiom Space intends to commercialize microgravity research and development, using the ISS National Lab until its modules are operational.

== Missions ==
In early June 2021, Axiom Space announced a deal with SpaceX which added three additional crewed flights to the ISS, for a total of four.

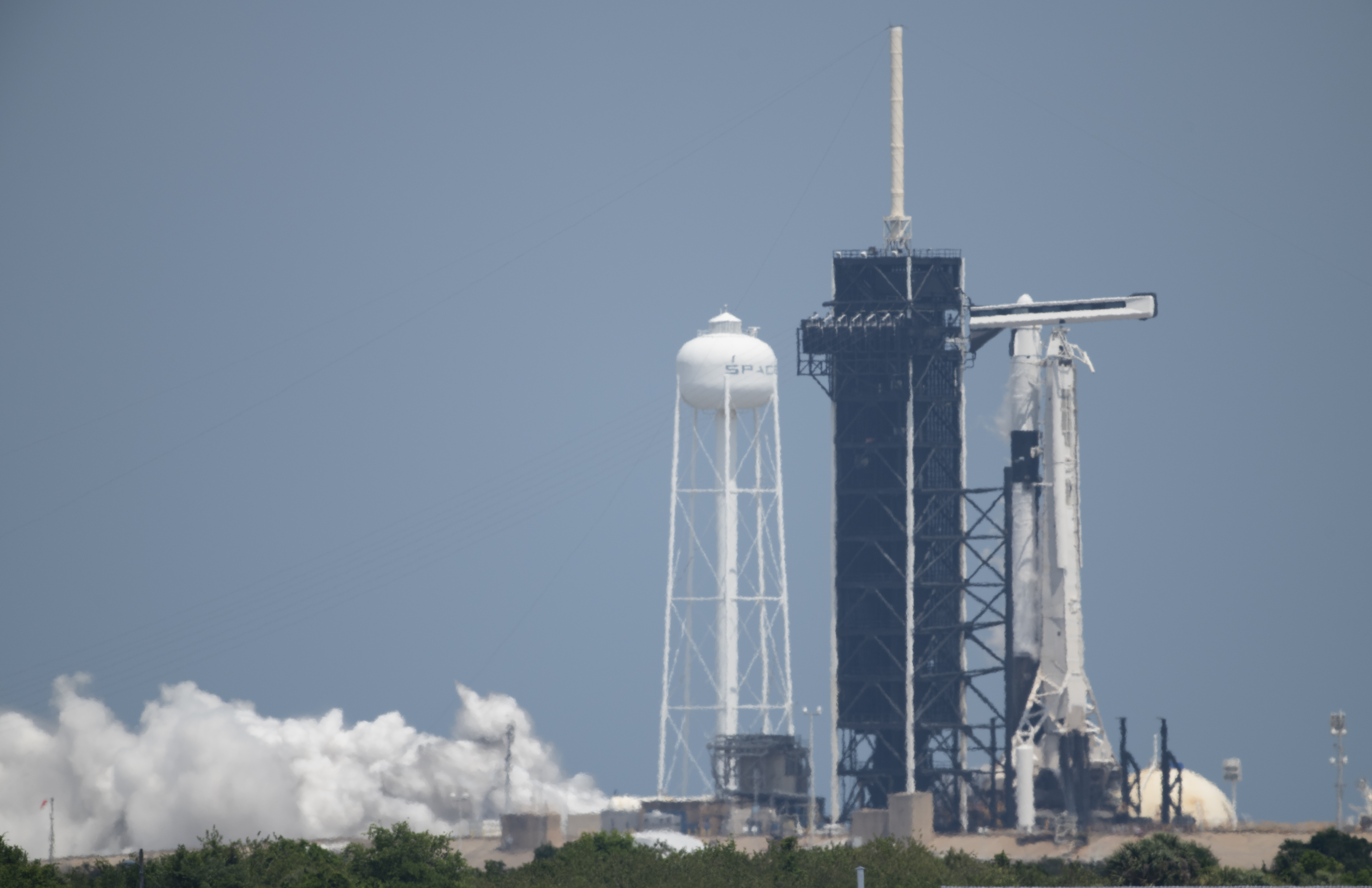
Axiom Mission 1 at LC-39A undergoing pre-launch preparations

=== Ax-1 ===
Axiom Mission 1 (or Ax-1) was a privately funded and operated crewed mission to the International Space Station (ISS). The mission was operated by Axiom Space out of Axiom's Mission Control Center MCC-A in Houston, Texas. The flight launched on April 8, 2022, from Kennedy Space Center in Florida. The spacecraft used was a SpaceX Crew Dragon. The crew consisted of Michael López-Alegría, a Spaniard-American and a professionally trained astronaut hired by Axiom, Eytan Stibbe from Israel, Larry Connor from the United States, and Mark Pathy from Canada.

=== Ax-2 ===
Ax-2 was a private crew mission to the ISS. The flight launched on May 21, 2023 and sent four people to the ISS. On May 25, 2021, Axiom Space announced that former NASA Astronaut Peggy Whitson would be the mission commander and John Shoffner would be the mission pilot. Two astronauts from the Kingdom of Saudi Arabia, Ali Alqarni and Rayyanah Barnawi were also on board as mission specialists.

=== Ax-3 ===
Ax-3 was a private crew mission to the ISS. The flight launched on January 18, 2024 and sent four people to the ISS. Former NASA Astronaut Michael López-Alegría was the mission commander and Walter Villadei was the mission pilot. Two astronauts from Turkey and Sweden, Alper Gezeravcı and Marcus Wandt were also on board as mission specialists.

=== Ax-4 ===
Ax-4 was a private crew mission to the ISS. The flight launched on June 25, 2025 and carried four people to the ISS, including veteran Axiom astronaut, Commander Peggy Whitson. With a crew consisting of Indian mission pilot Shubhanshu Shukla, and mission specialists Sławosz Uznański-Wiśniewski, from Poland, and Tibor Kapu, from Hungary.

=== Ax-5 ===
Ax-5 is a planned private crew mission to the ISS that will launch no earlier than January 2027.

== Axiom Mission Control Center ==
In January 2022, the Axiom Space Mission Control Center (or MCC-A) completed its first on-orbit science payload operation on the ISS. At this time, MCC-A, located at Axiom's HQ in Houston, TX, was registered as a payload operations site. In April 2022, MCC-A supported a record number of on-orbit science payload operations and live on-orbit events for Axiom's Ax-1 mission to ISS, which was the first all-private mission to the ISS. In late 2022, Axiom's MCC-A became a certified ISS partner Mission Control Center, connected to NASA's ISS program, joining a small handful of International partner MCCs and SpaceX's MCC. In May 2023, Axiom Space flew their second mission to ISS, Ax-2, supported entirely out of MCC-A by an Axiom Space flight control team of 6-10 flight controllers.

== Flights ==
=== Orbital ===
Mission	Launch date (UTC)	Landing date (UTC)	Crew	Duration	Vehicle	Remarks	Outcome
Axiom Mission 1	April 8, 2022	April 25, 2022	(United States) / (Spain) Michael López-Alegría; (United States) Larry Connor; (Canada) Mark Pathy; (Israel) Eytan Stibbe	17 days	Crew Dragon Endeavour	First Crew Dragon flight contracted by Axiom Space. First fully private flight to the ISS, carrying Michael López-Alegría as Axiom professional astronaut, Eytan Stibbe to conduct educational experiments for a 17-day trip, Larry Connor and Mark Pathy, both heading investment companies.	Success
Axiom Mission 2	May 21, 2023	May 31, 2023	(United States) Peggy Whitson; (United States) John Shoffner; (Saudi Arabia) Ali AlQarni; (Saudi Arabia) Rayyanah Barnawi	10 days	Crew Dragon Freedom	Second Crew Dragon flight contracted by Axiom Space. Second fully private flight to the ISS, carrying Peggy Whitson as Axiom professional astronaut.	Success
Axiom Mission 3	January 18, 2024	February 9, 2024	(United States) / (Spain) Michael López-Alegría; (Italy) Walter Villadei; (Turkey) Alper Gezeravcı; (Sweden) Marcus Wandt	21 days	Crew Dragon Freedom	Third Crew Dragon flight contracted by Axiom Space, astronauts are three military pilots whose flight is financed by their respective nations (Italy, Turkey and Sweden).	Success
Axiom Mission 4	June 25, 2025	July 15, 2025	(United States) Peggy Whitson (India) Shubhanshu Shukla (Poland) Sławosz Uznański-Wiśniewski (Hungary) Tibor Kapu	20 days	Crew Dragon Grace	Fourth Crew Dragon flight contracted by Axiom Space. This was the first crewed mission to space for both Poland and Hungary since the collapse of the Soviet Union, and was a training mission for the Indian Human Spaceflight Programme.	Success
Axiom Mission 5	NET January 2027	NET January 2027	TBA; TBA; TBA; TBA	15 days	TBA	Fifth Crew Dragon flight contracted by Axiom Space.	Planned

=== Suborbital ===
Mission	Launch date (UTC)	Landing date (UTC)	Crew	Duration	Vehicle	Remarks	Outcome
Galactic 07	June 8, 2024	June 8, 2024	(Italy) Nicola Pecile; (Canada) Jameel Janjua; (Turkey) Tuva Cihangir Atasever; (Italy) Giorgio Manenti; (United States) / (Israel) Irving (Yitzhak) Pergament; (United States) Andy Sadhwani	10 minutes	VSS Unity	First SpaceShipTwo flight contracted by Axiom Space. Tuva Atasever was trained as a backup for AX-3 before being selected for this mission, and was the only Axiom astronaut aboard.	Success

== Spacesuit ==
On June 1, 2022, NASA announced it had selected Axiom Space to develop and provide astronauts with next generation spacesuit and spacewalk systems to first test and later use outside the International Space Station, as well as on the lunar surface for the crewed Artemis missions, and prepare for human missions to Mars. The contract was awarded alongside a similar contract to Collins Aerospace to develop a new space suit for use on the ISS. On July 10, 2023, NASA awarded both Axiom and Collins an additional contract to develop alternatives to their space suits so they could be used in the other environment, with Collins to design a variant of their space suit that can work on the moon, and Axiom a variant of theirs for the space station. However, by June 24, 2024, Collins had "descoped" their contract to develop their suits despite testing a working prototype in micro-gravity to instead focus on maintaining the existing suits on the ISS, leaving Axiom as the sole developer of the new suits.

During the 41st Space Symposium on April 13, 2026, Axiom stated that they plan to fly a prototype of their suit into space sometime in 2027. However, just three days later on April 20, NASA's Office of Inspector General reported that "even with efforts to accelerate the schedule, there is little to no schedule margin for the spacesuits to be ready for the Artemis lunar landing mission" and that Axiom may not have the suits ready before the ISS is decommissioned and deorbited with their delivery not expected until 2031. Later that day NASA administrator Jared Isaacman stated "NASA is not taking a passive role in any component of America’s return to the lunar surface" that "we are reviewing where NASA can do better."

== International collaboration ==
=== Argentina ===
On July 2, 2025, Axiom Space signed a memorandum of understanding with the National Space Activities Commission to send Noel de Castro on a future Axiom mission to the ISS in 2027 alongside broader cooperating in space projects.

=== Canada ===
On September 21, 2022, Axiom Space signed a memorandum of understanding with the Canadian Space Agency to explore opportunities for sustained access to space and for a potential Canadian contribution to the Axiom station alongside scientific payloads there. Canadian Mark Pathy later flew on Axiom-1.

=== Czech Republic ===
On May 23, 2025, Martin Kupka, the Czech Ministry of Transport sent Axiom a letter of intent to fly Czech astronaut Aleš Svoboda to the ISS as part of their Czech Journey to Space on an upcoming Axiom mission building upon a 4 September 2024, memorandum with Axiom focused on innovating and enhancing the performance of materials in aerospace and other high-tech sectors.

=== Egypt ===
On May 23, 2025, Axiom signed a memorandum of understanding with the Egyptian Space Agency to establish a framework for joint initiatives, including research activities and support for human spaceflight efforts.

=== European Space Agency ===
On October 1, 2023, Axiom space signed a memorandum of understanding with the European Space Agency in Paris to foster science and technology development and to establish a working relationship with Axiom for potential post-ISS low-Earth orbit activities including access to Axiom station. This included sending Swedish ESA astronaut Marcus Wandt to the ISS on Axiom-3.

=== Ghana ===
On March 13, 2025, Axiom signed a memorandum of understanding with the Ghana Space Science and Technology Institute to enhance Ghana's space ecosystem and promote global access to space.

=== Hungary ===
On July 20, 2022, Axiom Space signed a memorandum of understanding with Péter Szijjártó, the Hungarian Minister of Foreign Affairs and Trade, to further their existing relationship in human spaceflight and to advance opportunities in space research and technology development as part of the Hungarian to Orbit program that later launched Tibor Kapu to the ISS on Axiom-4 as well as to bring Hungarian experiments to the future Axiom station. Axiom also signed a memorandum of understanding on October 25, 2024, with the Hungarian firm 4iG Space & Defence Technologies which is focused on digitalization and telecommunications.

=== India ===
On June 25, 2025, Axiom Space and India's Skyroot Aerospace signed a memorandum of understanding to collaborate on expanding access to low-Earth orbit. For future missions to Axiom Station and beyond, both companies will investigate combined orbital and launch technologies. In order to build space infrastructure, the two companies will work on collaborative ventures. The collaboration aims to establish a new logistical corridor for research payloads, orbital data-center nodes, and future commercial missions by linking Skyroot's planned Vikram-1 launch capability with Axiom's under-construction commercial space station and other low-Earth-orbit projects.

Axiom also entered a partnership with the Indian Space Research Organisation to launch Shubhanshu Shukla as a mission pilot on Axiom-4 as part of his training for the upcoming first manned Gaganyaan mission.

=== Israel ===
Eytan Stibbe was part of the crew of Axiom-1 and launched as part of the Rakia Mission, a collaboration between the Ramon Foundation, Israel Space Agency, Israel Innovation Authority, and Ministry of Education.

=== Italy ===
On May 25, 2022, Axiom signed a memorandum of understanding with Vittorio Colao, the Italian Minister for Technological Innovation and Digital Transition, to further their existing collaboration centered around the development of space infrastructure, and an Italian Module to their upcoming Axiom station (which later became the Payload Power Thermal Module). Additionally, Walter Villadei, an Italian Air Force Colonel was selected as one of Axiom's commercial astronauts who flew on Ax-3.

=== Mexico ===
On October 24, 2025, at the International Astronautical Congress, Axiom signed a memorandum of understanding with the Mexican Space Agency to advance cutting-edge technologies that improve life on Earth focusing on telecommunications and microgravity research.

=== New Zealand ===
On June 22, 2022, Axiom signed a memorandum of understanding with the government of New Zealand to provide access to conduct research on the ISS on Axiom missions and later to the Axiom station.

=== Poland ===
Axiom signed a memorandum of understanding with POLSA at the 2024 International Astronautical Congress on October 25, to send Sławosz Uznański-Wiśniewski to space on Axiom Mission 4 as part of the Ignis mission in collaboration with the ESA as well as to establish long-term collaboration in technology development, microgravity research, and public engagement.

=== Portugal ===
On May 13, 2025, at the New Space Atlantic Summit Axiom signed a memorandum of understanding with the Portuguese Space Agency and National Innovation Agency promoting joint efforts in innovation, research, and development across key domains of the space economy. On September 30, Axiom selected Portuguese Emiliano Ventura as a private "project astronaut" for an upcoming Axiom mission.

=== Saudi Arabia ===
On September 22, 2022, Axiom signed a memorandum of understanding with the Saudi Space Commission to launch the second Saudi man, Ali AlQarni, and first woman, Rayyanah Barnawi, to space on Axiom-2. The two would sign a second memorandum on December 1, 2023, to bolster Saudi Arabia's effort to increase its microgravity Research and space technologies in general.

=== Senegal ===
On October 6, 2025, Axiom signed a memorandum of understanding with the Senegalese Agency for Space Studies to collaborate on activities in low-Earth orbit to accelerate Senegal’s space ambitions while expanding opportunities for global cooperation in human spaceflight, research, and technology development.

=== Slovakia ===
On October 7, 2025, Axiom signed a memorandum of understanding with Michal Brichta, the Space Director of the Slovak Investment and Trade Development Agency to facilitate collaboration on the development of orbital data centers and to support satellite construction and operations and research payloads.

=== Turkey ===
On September 19, 2022 Axiom signed a second memorandum of understanding with the TÜBİTAK Space Technologies Research Institute in partnership with the Turkish Space Agency to launch the first Turkish astronaut, Alper Gezeravcı, to the ISS on Axiom-3.

On January 18, 2025, Axiom signed a second memorandum of understanding with the Turkish Space Agency to explore and identify potential supply chain opportunities for the Turkish space industry ecosystem on the planned Axiom station as well as cooperation in fields such as space technology, aerospace, textiles, material science, advanced manufacturing, communications, and life sciences.

=== United Arab Emirates ===
On April 29, 2022, Axiom space signed a memorandum of understanding with the Mohammed bin Rashid Space Centre to launch an Emirati astronaut a future Axiom mission as a follow-up to Hazza Al Mansouri who was launched to the ISS on Soyuz MS-15. However, no UAE astronaut would fly on an Axiom mission, as Axiom instead bought a seat on Soyuz MS-18 for Mark T. Vande Hei so Sultan Al Neyadi could take his spot on SpaceX Crew-6.

=== United Kingdom ===
On October 25, 2023, Axiom signed an agreement with Dr Paul Bate, Chief Executive Officer of the UK Space Agency, to pursue a "UK astronaut mission", with a crew of four to be sent not to the ISS, but to Low Earth Orbit to perform a two-week standalone mission to carry out scientific research, demonstrate new technologies, and participate in education and outreach activities. On July 23, 2024, Tim Peake a British ESA astronaut, was hired as an Axiom commercial astronaut.

On March 20, 2025, Liverpool City Region mayor Steve Rotheram and Greater Manchester mayor Andy Burnham signed a memorandum of understanding with Axiom space to facilitate space-based research, development, and manufacturing infrastructure in The North West of England.

== See also ==
- Commercialization of space
- Private spaceflight
- Vast (company)
