= Kam Ghaffarian =

American businessman

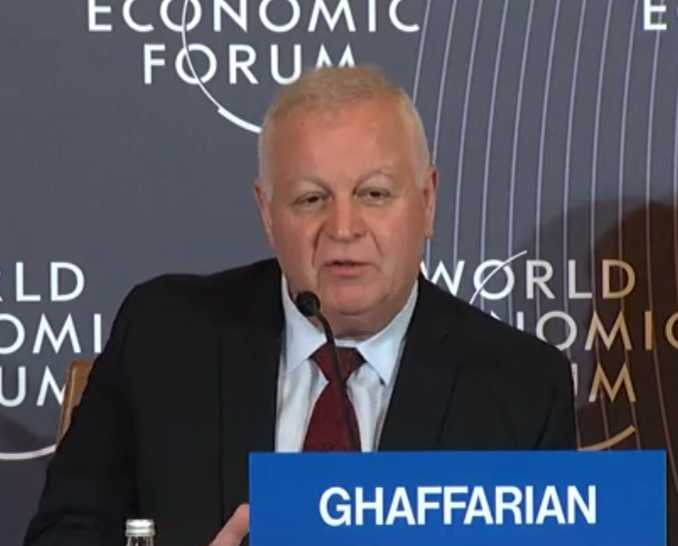
- At a WEF special meeting in 2024
- Born: Iran
- Occupation: Businessman
- Known for: Axiom Space, X-energy, Intuitive Machines, Quantum Space
- Notable work: Founder of IBX Inc. Chairman of Axiom Space Founder of Quantum Space
- Title: Founder, CEO
- Awards: State Award of the Republic of Armenia for Global Contribution to High Technologies (2026)

Kamal "Kam" Ghaffarian (Persian: کمال غفاریان) is an Iranian-born American businessman who focuses on the space industry and new energies and is known as the co-founder of IBX, Axiom Space, Intuitive Machines, X-energy and Quantum Space.

== Life and education ==
Ghaffarian was born in Iran and his passion in space increased when he watched the historic event of the 1969 Apollo 11 Moon landing on television. He came to the United States at the age of 17 and began attending college at 18.

He holds B.S. degrees in engineering (The Catholic University of America) and Electrical and Electronics Engineering (Capitol Technology University), an M.Sc. in Information Technology (The George Washington University), and a PhD in Management Information Systems (Capitol Technology University).

Beside his work in industry, Kam is an active philanthropist focused on education, STEM initiatives, scientific research, and promotion of projects towards achieving interstellar travel.

In 2019, he established Limitless Space Institute, a non-profit organization focused on scientific research, engaging students, and enabling future interstellar human space exploration. In 2026, Ghaffarrian co-founded The Fermi Explorer Mission with the aim of launching the first spacecraft to another star by the end of 2029.

== Career ==
During his college, Kam began working for Lockheed Martin when he was doing contract for NASA. He also previously held numerous technical and management positions at companies like Ford Aerospace, and Loral. After that he launched his own space company, Stinger Ghaffarian Technologies (SGT), co-founded with Harold Stinger in 1994.

The company operated as a contractor to government agencies focusing on IT, engineering, science applications, and mission operations. It became NASA’s second-largest engineering services contractor and generated over half a billion dollars in annual revenues. The company was acquired by KBR for $355 million in February 2018.

Ghaffarian founded X-energy LLC in 2009. The company designs high-temperature gas-cooled nuclear reactors. He also co-founded a space exploration company Intuitive Machines in 2013. The company holds multiple contracts with NASA.

In 2016, he co-founded another company, Houston-based Axiom Space, with Michael Suffredini. The company is focusing on private space missions and facilities and planned to build the first private space station.

As of October 2019, Ghaffarian was appointed to the Nuclear Energy Institute’s Board of Directors.

In 2020, he co-founded Quantum Space, whose mission is to build satellites that provide communications, navigation and space domain awareness in the cislunar space, the area between the Earth and the Moon.

He became a billionaire several times over in first quarter of 2023 after his company, Intuitive Machines, wrapped up a SPAC merger and shares skyrocketed as much as 1,200% in one week.

On February 22, 2024, a robotic lander from Intuitive Machines landed semi-autonomously on the moon. The original plan was for the lander to be autonomous, but "a problem surfaced with the spacecraft’s autonomous navigation system that required engineers on the ground to employ an untested work-around at the 11th hour."

== Honors ==
On November 5, 2026, Prime Minister Nikol Pashinyan presented Ghaffarian with the State Award of the Republic of Armenia for Global Contribution to High Technologies at a ceremony at the presidential residence in Yerevan. He was the award's 17th laureate and was nominated by Garik Israelian, co-founder of the Starmus Festival.

== Philanthropy ==
In May 2026, while serving as commencement speaker at Capitol Technology University, Ghaffarian surprised graduating students by distributing gold envelopes containing $1,500 cash gifts to each graduate. According to the university, the gesture was inspired by financial support he received from family members after immigrating to the United States."Commencement Speaker Dr. Kam Ghaffarian Surprises Capitol Tech Graduates with Generous Cash Gift". Capitol Technology University. May 5, 2026.
