= StemRad =

Israeli-American start-up

StemRad Ltd. / StemRad Inc.
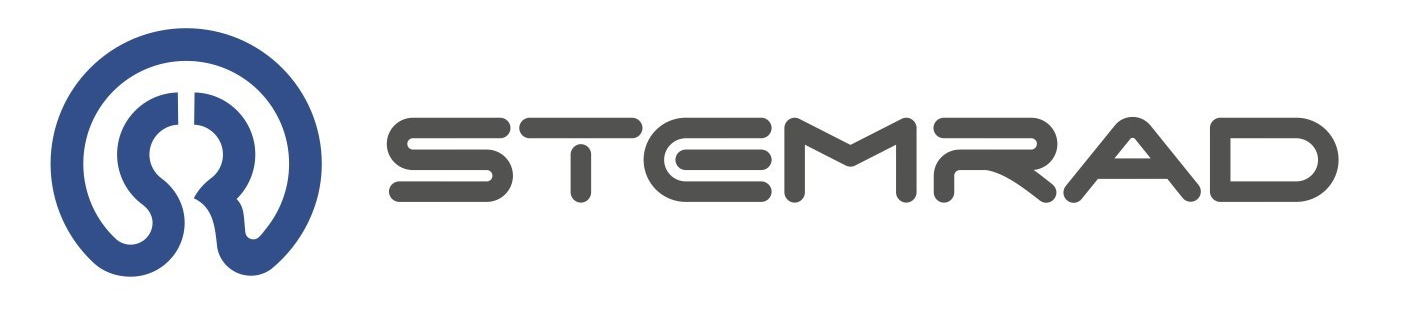
- Industry: Personal protective equipment
- Founded: 2011
- Founders: Oren Milstein and Daniel Levitt
- Headquarters: Tampa, Florida, United States; Tel Aviv, Israel
- Website: www.stemrad.com

StemRad is an Israeli-American start-up company that develops and manufactures personal protective equipment (PPE) against ionizing radiation. Its first product was the 360 Gamma, a device that protects the user's pelvic bone marrow from gamma radiation. StemRad has also developed the StemRad MD, a protective suit designed to provide whole-body radiation protection to physicians, and the AstroRad vest for radiation protection in space, which is currently being tested on the International Space Station and is one of the primary payloads onboard NASA's Artemis 1 lunar mission.

In 2023, StemRad secured a $4.5 million contract with the U.S. Department of Defense to provide wearable gamma radiation shielding for military personnel.

== History ==
StemRad was founded in December 2011 by Oren Milstein and Daniel Levitt. They were inspired to create the company by the Chernobyl disaster where many of the firemen and engineers, who were first on the scene, died from high doses of gamma radiation in an illness known as Acute Radiation Syndrome (ARS), also known as radiation sickness. This idea was fueled by a sense of urgency due to the growing nuclear threat on the state of Israel. Following the Fukushima Daiichi nuclear disaster in March 2011, the two partnered with Roger Kornberg, Aaron Ciechanover and Michael Levitt.

== Products ==
=== 360 Gamma ===
The 360 Gamma is a 14 kg (31 lb) belt designed to protect the pelvic area against gamma radiation. It is meant to be worn by first responders (fire fighters, paramedics, police and the military), that would be exposed to radiation in the event of a nuclear emergency. It does not attempt to protect the whole body of the wearer, but, rather, selectively protects the bone marrow-rich pelvic region. It is offered as a solution for acute radiation syndrome (ARS), a major component of which is bone marrow failure.

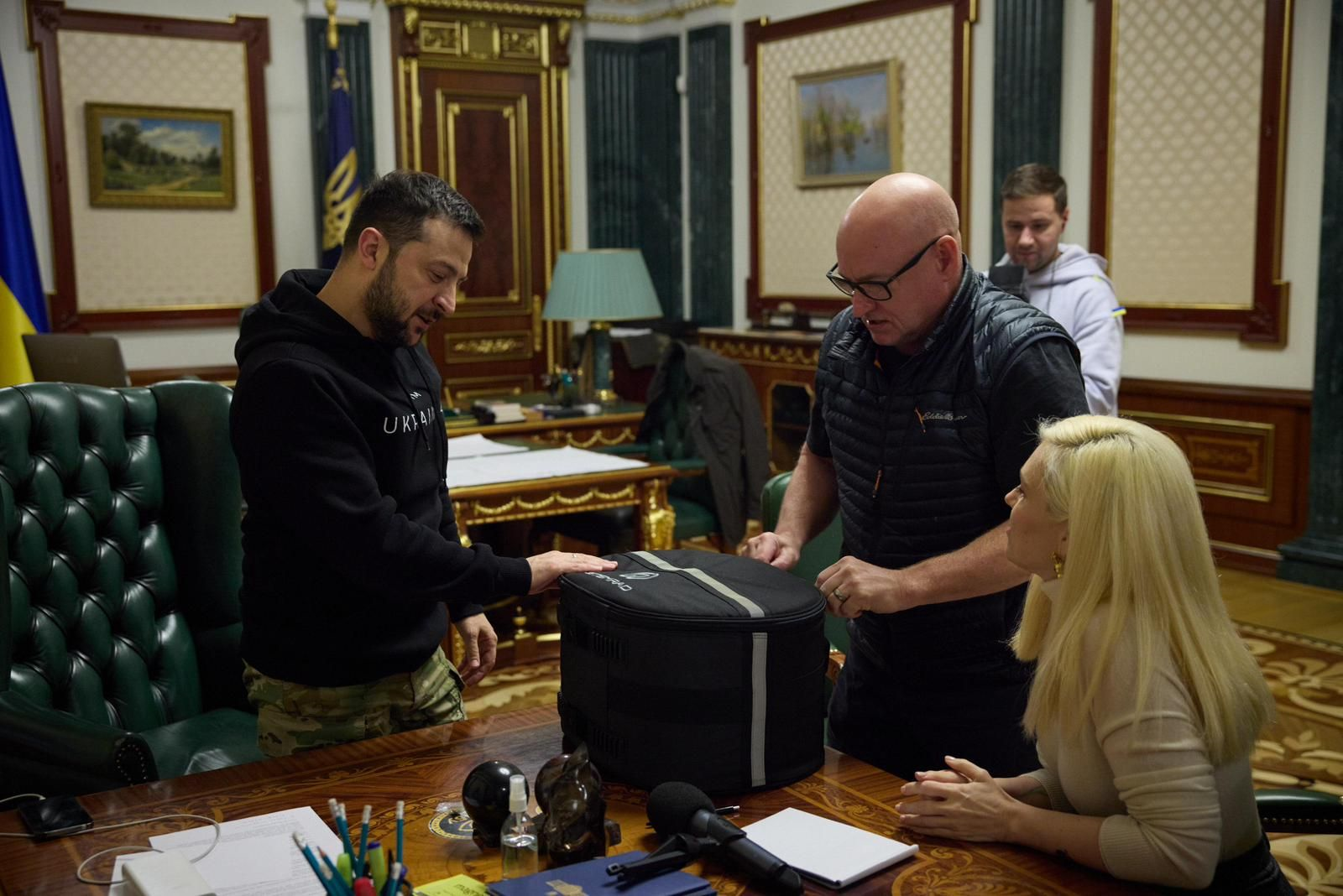
Former NASA Astronaut Scott Kelly (a member of StemRad's advisory board) presents a 360 Gamma belt to Ukrainian President Volodymyr Zelenskyy as part of StemRad's donation to Ukrainian first responders during the 2022 Russian Invasion of Ukraine.

In November 2022, as a precaution to the risk of a nuclear emergency during the 2022 Russian invasion of Ukraine brought about by Russian threats to use nuclear weapons and the continued shelling of the Zaporizhzhia Nuclear Power Plant, StemRad began donating 360 Gamma devices to Ukrainian first responders.

=== AstroRad ===
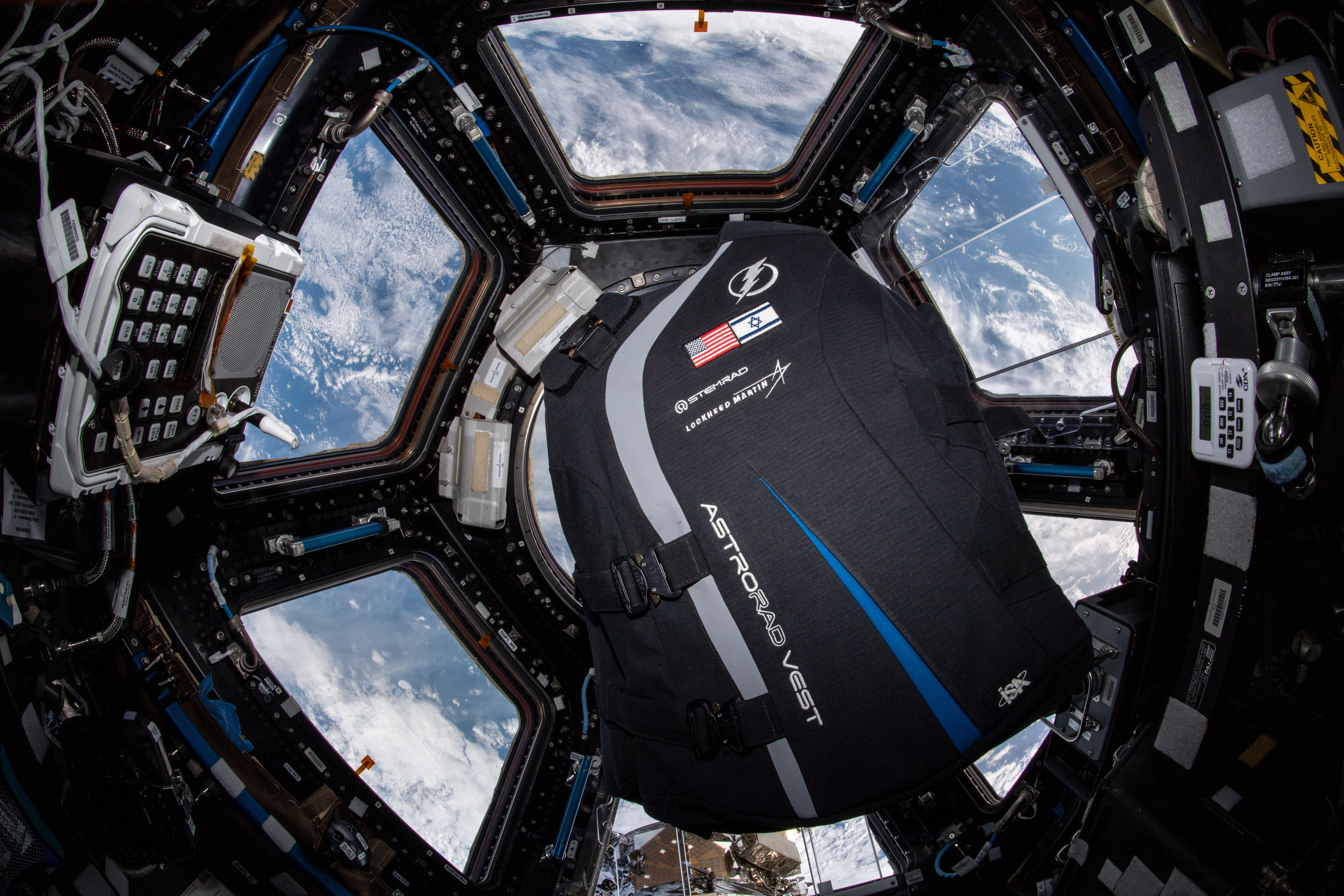
AstroRad vest on ISS

AstroRad is personal protective equipment for astronauts to be worn beyond low Earth orbit which was co-developed by StemRad and Lockheed Martin. AstroRad protects bone marrow to prevent acute radiation sickness but is further expanded to also protect the lungs, stomach, colon, breast and ovaries – organs that are particularly sensitive to the development of cancer due to chronic exposure to radiation. The AstroRad vest is strongly effective in shielding astronauts from the solar energetic particles (SEP) released during solar storms. The functional shielding material is made of high-density polyethylene (HDPE), which is a hydrogenous compound (with a high ratio of electrons to neutrons) optimized for shielding against charged particle radiation like SEP, according to the Bethe-Bloch formula.

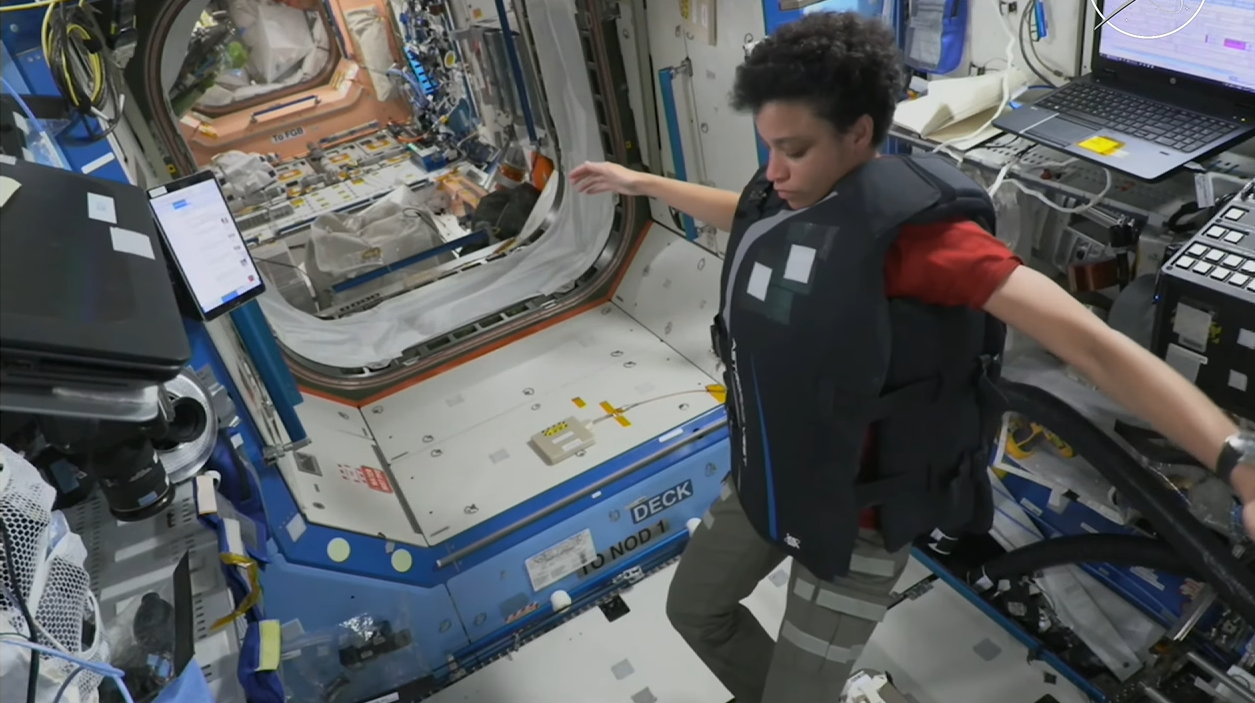
NASA Astronaut Jessica Watkins evaluates the AstroRad vest on the ISS for the Comfort and Human Factors AstroRad Radiation Garment Evaluation (CHARGE) study.

As a test before its planned use in deep space, an AstroRad vest launched to the International Space Station (ISS) in low Earth orbit on November 2, 2019 aboard Cygnus NG-12 as part of the Comfort and Human Factors AstroRad Radiation Garment Evaluation (CHARGE) study. Four female astronauts wore the AstroRad vest in microgravity for variable durations during routine activities, providing feedback on ergonomics, range of motion, comfort and general user experience. In addition, entrepreneur and former Israeli Air Force pilot Eytan Stibbe wore the AstroRad vest during Axiom Mission 1, a privately funded and operated crewed mission to the ISS, in April 2022.

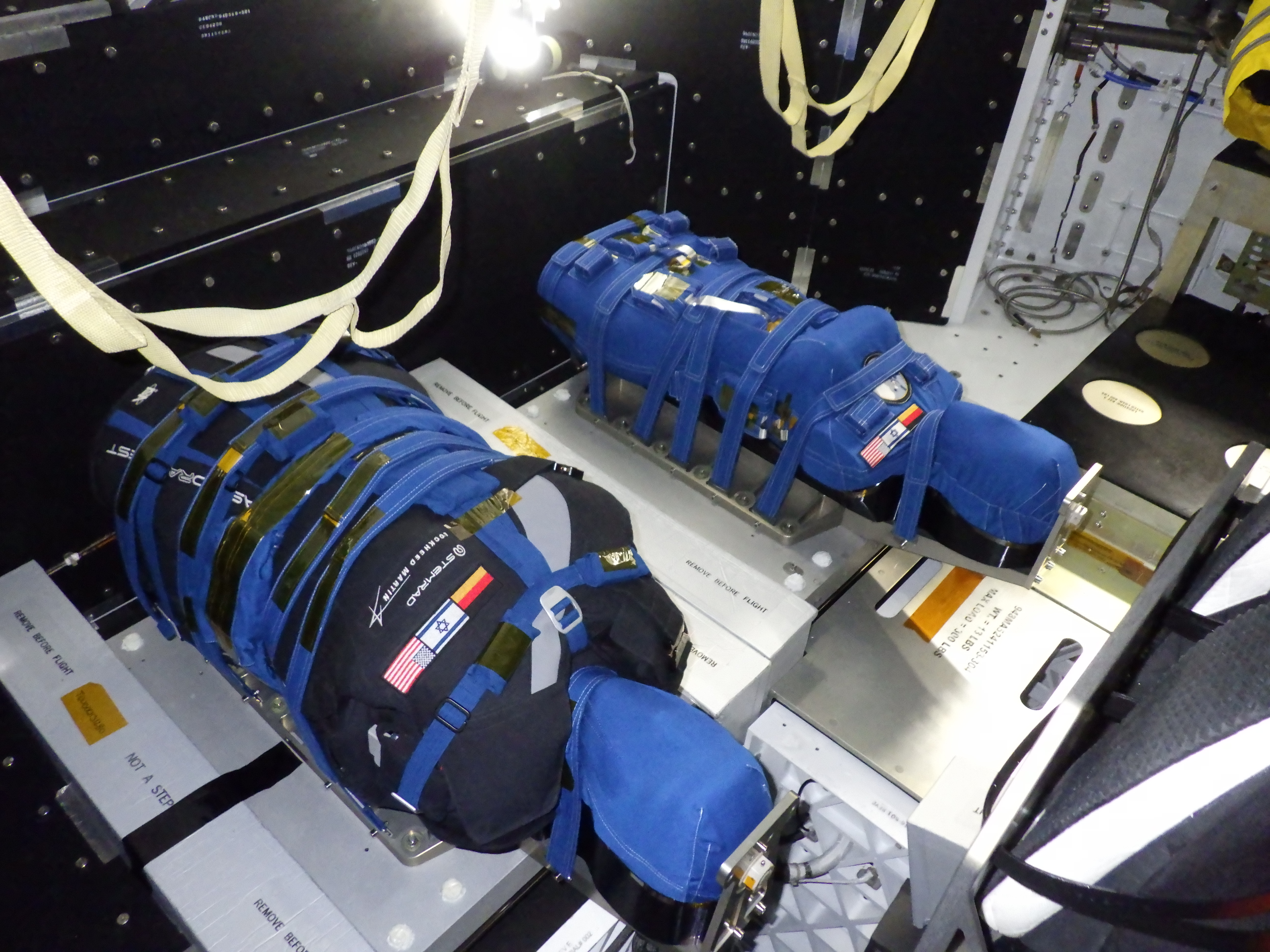
Radiation dosimetry phantoms Helga and Zohar, with Zohar wearing an AstroRad radiation protection vest, inside the Orion spacecraft prior to the launch of Artemis 1.

The AstroRad vest was also one of the primary payloads onboard NASA's Artemis 1 mission, which launched an uncrewed Orion spacecraft in a Moon-orbiting trajectory on November 16, 2022, as part of the Matroshka AstroRad Radiation Experiment (MARE), an international collaboration between the Israeli Space Agency, the German Aerospace Center, NASA, and Lockheed Martin. Onboard the crew module were two female radiation dosimetry phantom torsos named Helga and Zohar, which measured radiation exposure throughout the body during the mission via both passive and active dosimeters distributed at sensitive and high stem cell-concentration tissues. By comparing the dosimetry data from Helga and Zohar, the effectiveness of the AstoRad vest in shielding astronauts from radiation in deep space will be experimentally quantified.

=== StemRad MD ===
The StemRad MD is a protective system designed for interventional radiologists and other physicians who perform medical imaging using ionizing radiation, most notably fluoroscopy. This technology was designed to increase whole-body protection, particularly to the head, while providing physicians relatively free-range motion capabilities while operating. For ergonomic relief, the StemRad MD system uses a proprietary exoskeleton system.

The protective ensemble consists of four main parts: a protective apron, a protective visor, a thyroid collar, and an exoskeletal system. The protective apron is of bismuth-antimony bilayer composition and offers 0.5mm lead-equivalent protection with a small overlap area of 1mm in the front. The visor is made up of a transparent lead-acrylic material. It is positioned at an angle so that it blocks most of the radiation coming from underneath and allows the physician to wear unshielded prescription glasses while performing procedures. The thyroid collar is integrated into the protective apron component and is flush with the bottom side of the protective visor.
