= Michael Suffredini =

Former CEO of Axiom Space and former manager of the ISS program

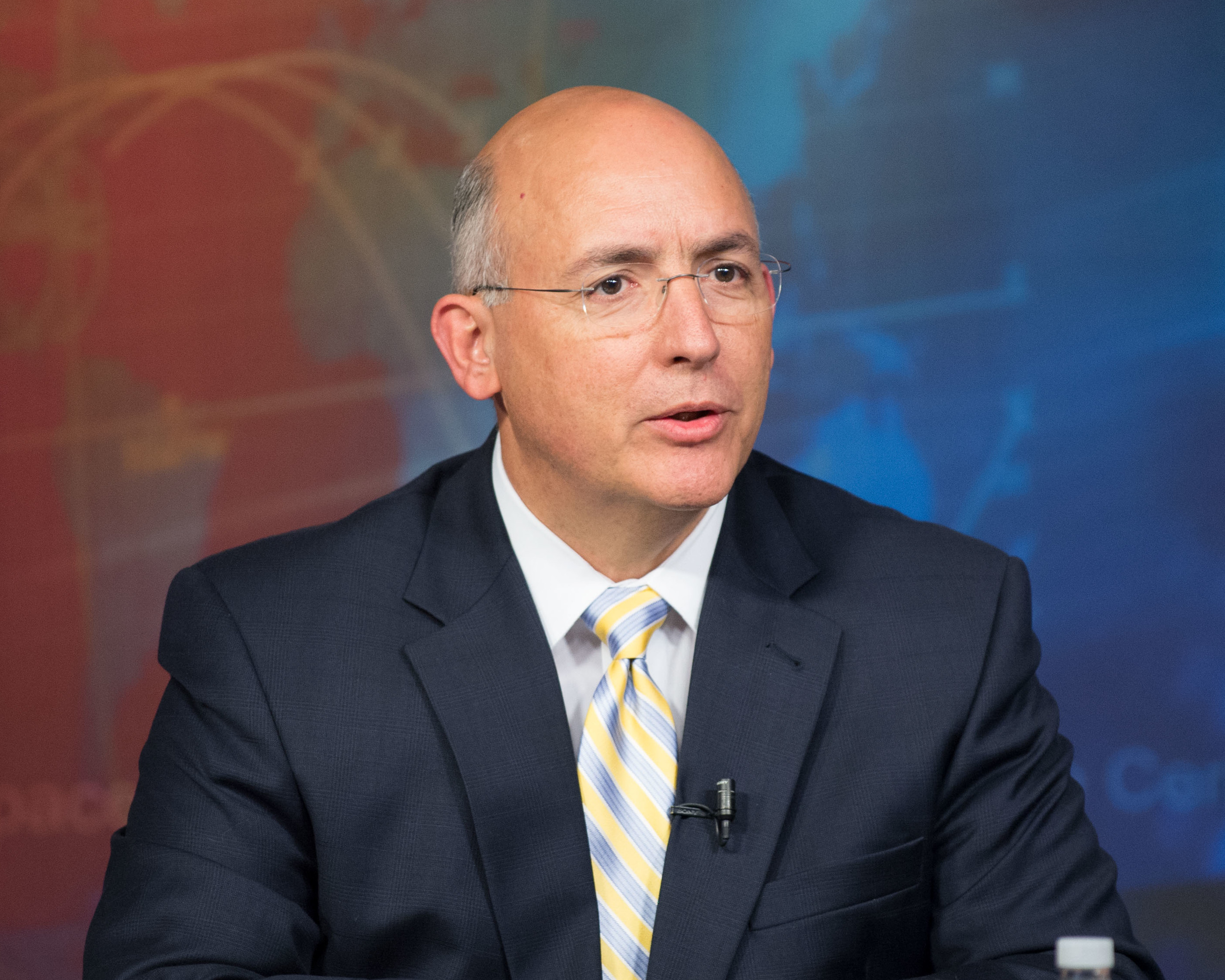
Michael Suffredini in 2012

Michael Suffredini is an American aerospace engineer noted for his pioneering work in the development of space stations. He served as NASA’s Program Manager for the International Space Station and also co-founded Axiom Space Inc., which is developing the world’s first commercial space station.

== Biography ==
Suffredini’s birth details are not accessible in the public domain. In an interview, he attributed his interest in space to Neil Armstrong, whom he watched land on the moon as a child. He was focused on becoming a “space guy” so he pursued aerospace engineering at the University of Texas at Austin. He was initially focused on high-performance aircraft but this changed when he came to study orbital dynamics at school under Victor Szebehely. He claimed that this prompted him to shift to the space industry. Suffredini graduated in 1983.

=== ISS ===
Suffredini started at NASA operations until he became involved with the evaluation of the Space Shuttle mission as a civil servant in 1989. He later became involved in the ISS program and his early notable works include the creation of the ISS Research Office. By 2005, he was appointed Program Manager of the International Space Station, a position he held until 2015. Prior to this, he was serving as the Assistant Manager of NASA’s Space Shuttle Program. During his tenure, the space station’s assembly was completed, and he also oversaw its transition to full utilization.

=== Axiom Space ===
After leaving NASA, Suffredini co-founded Axiom Space Inc. in 2016 with Kam Ghaffarian. This company, which was established in Houston, Texas, near the Johnson Space Center, aims to launch the first commercial space station. Suffredini replaced Ghaffarian as the company’s President and CEO. In an interview, he cited that Axiom is to support innovators through an on-orbit infrastructure.

On August 9, 2024, it was announced that Suffredini stepped down as CEO of Axiom. He was previously replaced as President by Matt Ondler.

== Awards ==
In recognition of Suffredini’s work, he was awarded the Rank of Meritorious Executive and Rank of Distinguished Executive, which was conferred by the President of the United States. He was also a recipient of the NASA Distinguished Service medal and Outstanding Leadership award, the National Air and Space Museum Trophy, and the Yuri Gagarin Medal.
