= Quantum Space (company) =

American spacecraft manufacturer

Quantum Space is a company founded in 2022 that plans to develop a line of spacecraft called Ranger that will operate in geosynchronous and cislunar space. Corporate leadership includes Dr. Kam Ghaffarian, Kerry Wisnosky and Ben Reed. Ghaffarian is also chairman of Axiom Space. In May of 2026, Jim Bridenstine became CEO. The company is based in Rockville, Maryland. In September 2025, the company announced it acquired the multi-modal propulsion tech of space company Phase Four as part of a shift of the company into using its Ranger spacecraft for the proposed Golden Dome.

In May, 2026, construction was announced of a parts manufacturing facility for the company to be located at the Tulsa International Airport in the Spartan Building, being one of the original hangers for the field. This will become Quantum’s primary site for production of precision spacecraft parts, as well as large propulsion tanks.

== Ranger Prime ==
On 26 October 2022 Quantum Space announced its first spacecraft mission, originally called QS-1. The mission was to collect space domain awareness data. The QS-1 spacecraft launch was originally scheduled for October 2024.

On 22 October 2025, the mission name was changed to Ranger Prime, with a launch scheduled for June 2026. The mission will use the Ranger 500, which will include processor and navigation electronics provided by Beyond Gravity, a subsidiary of RUAG. The mission's goal was changed to validate the performance of its “remote proximity targeting operations” as part of the company's shift into defense applications.
