= Larry Connor =

American real estate and technology entrepreneur (born 1950)

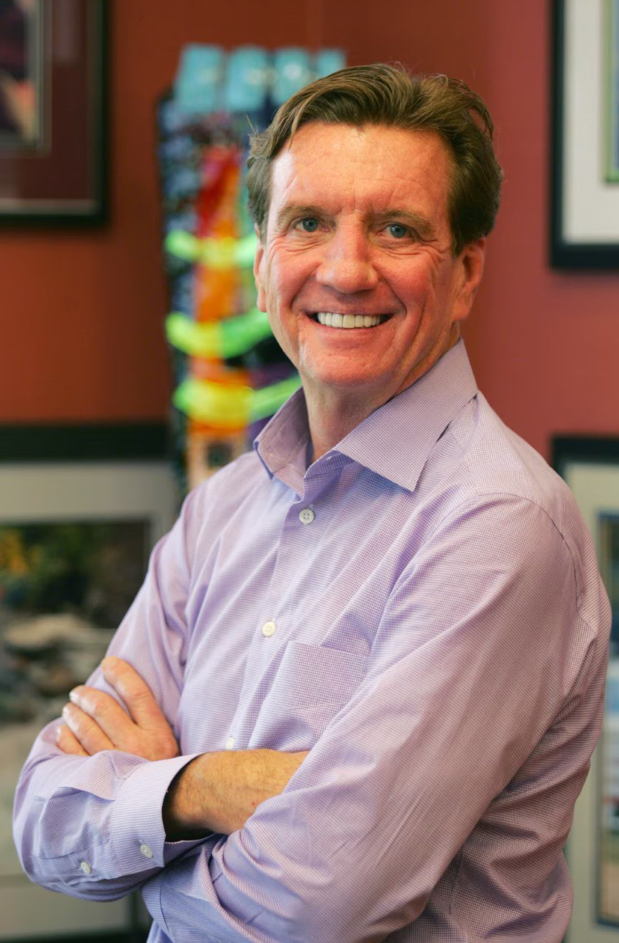
- Born: 7 January 1950 (age 76); Albany, New York, U.S.
- Space career

Axiom Space
- Time in space: 17 days, 1 hour and 48 minutes
- Missions: Axiom Mission 1

Larry Connor (born January 7, 1950) is an American real estate and technology businessman, private astronaut and former racing driver. Connor is the head of the Connor Group, a real estate investment firm located in Miamisburg, Ohio.

== Education ==
Born in 1950 in Albany, New York, Connor graduated from Archbishop Alter High School in 1968 in Kettering, Ohio, a suburb of Dayton, and summa cum laude in 1972 from Ohio University in Athens, Ohio where he was a member of Sigma Phi Epsilon. Connor was a member of Who’s Who of College Students and was one of 22 students out of a class of 4,500 undergraduates selected to the Ohio University J Club.

== Career ==
From 1982 to 1990, Connor owned Orlando Computer Corp. The company had operations in central Florida and Cincinnati, OH, providing hardware and software to businesses. The Connor Group, a real estate investment firm, was founded as Connor, Murphy & Buhrman in 1992. Connor bought out his partners and established the Connor Group in 2003. Over the next 18 years, the Connor Group grew from $100 million in assets to $4 billion.

Connor co-founded Heartland Regional Power in 2004. First Billing Services, an online payment and bill processing platform also co-founded by Connor, later acquired the firm. In 2007, Connor founded the Connor Group Kids & Community Partners, serving disadvantaged youth in communities where the Connor Group operates.

Connor has been a member of the National Council of McLean Hospital since 2008. Connor and the Connor Group have received awards including the 2014 Glassdoor Top 50 Best Places to Work in the US, Small and Medium-Sized Companies, a nomination to the Dayton Magazine 2017 Dayton Business Hall of Fame and multiple Dayton Business Journal Top 100 Businesses in the Region.

In 2017, Connor lead fundraising efforts for the redevelopment of The University of Dayton's indoor stadium, UD Arena. He was tasked with raising $33 million of the $72 million total. Connor made a substantial donation himself, before finding other donors to raise the amount required. The stadium opened in 2019 following its renovation.

Connor co-founded First Billing Services in 2003, which provided payment solutions to utility and municipal government clients. In 2019, it was announced that it would be acquired by Atlanta-based, Paya Inc.

During the COVID-19 pandemic, Connor made efforts to help alleviate effects of the pandemic for his employees. On April 23, 2020, he donated $1.6 million as bonuses to his employees, which was given to those on salaries under $150,000 per year. He also agreed to fund childcare expenses and expanded the company-sponsored loan program.

== Sports and personal interests ==
Connor is a private pilot involved in several aerobatic competitions.

In 1983, Connor had a single start in the Atlantic Championship, named Formula Mondial North America at the time, and raced intermittently at various levels of SCCA and Formula 2000 competition since, as well as vintage racing. In 2000 and 2001, Connor was the winner of the SCCA Formula Atlantic National Championship. He also raced in 2002 to defend his title. Later that year, he competed in the 2002 24 Hours of Daytona.

In 2003, Connor was part of the winning team at Petit Le Mans in the LMP675 class. Connor also competed in the 2004 24 Hours of Le Mans. In 2005, Connor signed with Genoa Racing to make his Infiniti Pro Series debut at the Liberty Challenge, but an airborne crash during qualifying left him out of the event, being credited with a finishing position despite not starting the race. He later came back at Watkins Glen, finishing 8th in his only start in the series.

Connor is the founder of Team C Racing. Competing in the Truck Spec class, Connor won the Baja 1000 in 2014. In June 2016, the team won the Baja 500 Trophy Truck Spec series. Team C Racing recorded a winning time of ten hours and 33 minutes, two hours in front of the second placed team.

In April 2021, Connor completed three dives in the Hadal zone, part of the Pacific Ocean with depths below 20,000 ft. The dives were completed alongside Patrick Lahey, with the aim of better understanding of the geologic and biologic makeup of the Hadal zone. The three dives covered Challenger Deep, Sirena Deep and a seamount in the Mariana Trench. Prior to April 2021, only two other people had explored the Sirena Deep: Victor Vescovo and Alan Jamieson in 2018. Connor reported that he aimed to go both to space and to the deepest part of the ocean within the same year.

On April 8, 2022, Connor was a private astronaut on Axiom Mission 1, traveling to the International Space Station (ISS). The mission was the first all-private space mission to the International Space Station, with Connor one of a four-member crew, serving as pilot. At 72 years of age, Connor was the second oldest person to enter orbit, after John Glenn who entered space aged 77. Connor took heart cells to the ISS' microgravity laboratory.

In May 2024, it was announced that Connor was behind the design and building of a $20 million submersible, the Triton 4000/2 Abyssal Explorer, and planned to voyage to the wreck of the OceanGate Titan submersible implosion with Triton Submarines co-founder Patrick Lahey to prove that a journey to the Titanic site is possible, and safe, and that the industry had made improvements in the wake of the OceanGate implosion.

In September 2024, Connor received the National Aviation Hall of Fame’s Armstrong Award, recognizing his leadership and innovation in aviation and aerospace.

=== Complete 24 Hours of Le Mans results ===
Year	Team	Co-Drivers	Car	Class	Laps	Pos.	Class Pos.
2004	(United States) Intersport Racing	(United States) Jon Field (United States) Duncan Dayton	Lola B01/60	LMP1	29	DNF	DNF

=== American open–wheel racing results ===
(key) (Races in bold indicate pole position)

==== Indy Pro Series ====
Year	Team	1	2	3	4	5	6	7	8	9	10	11	12	13	14	Rank	Points
2005	Genoa Racing	HOM	PHO	STP	INDY	TEX	IGP; 14	NSH	MIL	KEN	PPI	SON	CHI	WGI; 8	CAL	**20th**	**40**

== See also ==
- List of people who descended to Challenger Deep
