= Claudia Kessler =

German engineer

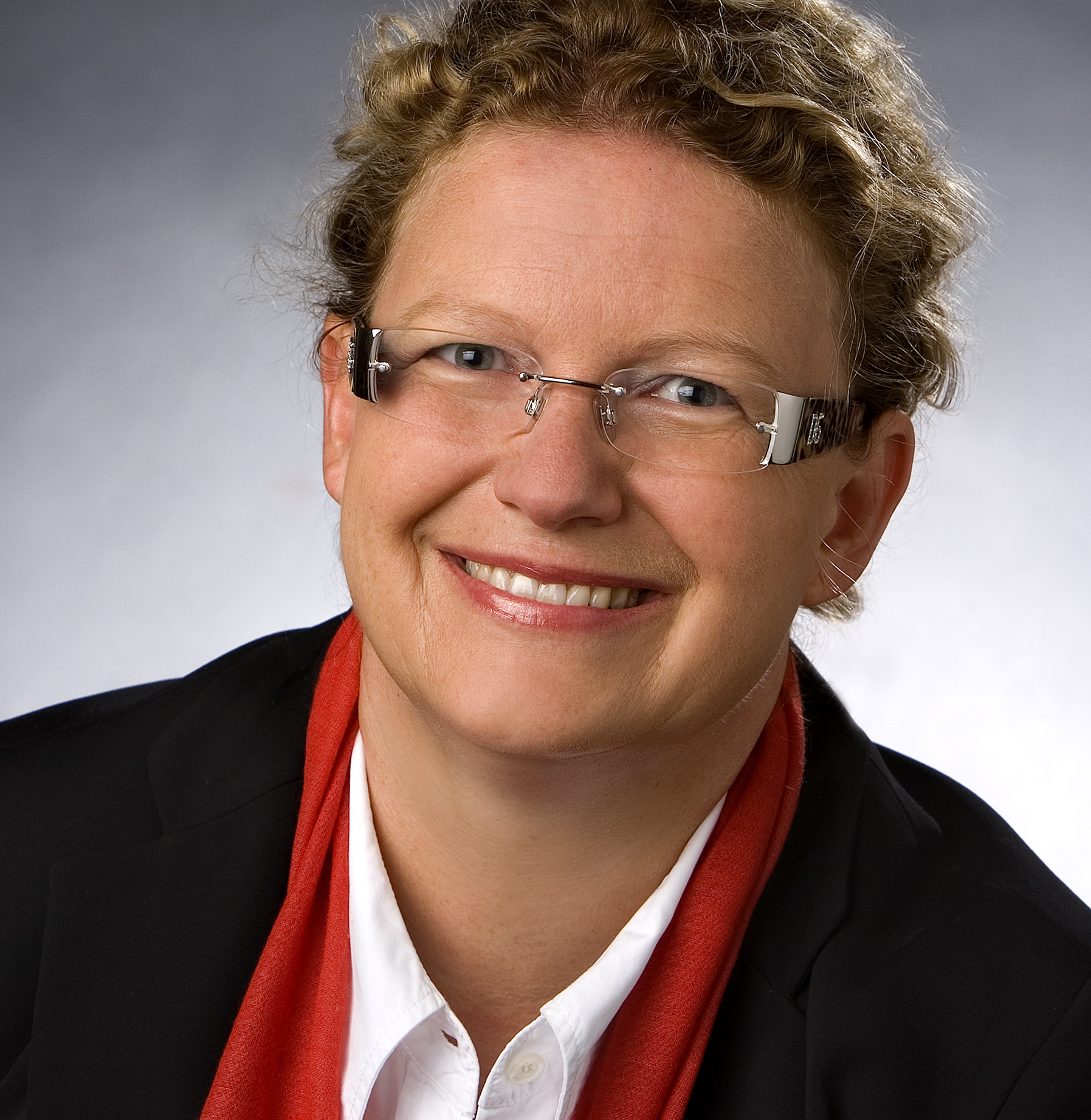
Claudia Kessler (2012)

Claudia Kessler (born 1965) is a German aerospace engineer and one of the few female executives in the space sector. She is the founder of the private foundation Die Astronautin, which aims to support the first German female astronaut to fly into space.

== Life and work ==
Claudia Kessler grew up in Mühldorf am Inn in Upper Bavaria. Her mother was involved in local politics and was the first woman in Mühldorf am Inn to be elected town councillor, her father was a motor vehicle mechatronics technician and later a car dealer.

After graduating from high school, she studied mechanical engineering at the Technical University of Munich from 1984. After passing the Vordiplom, she chose to specialize in aerospace engineering and completed her studies in 1990 as an Diplomingenieurin. Her thesis 1989–1990 was written in collaboration with the Institute of Space and Astronautics Japan. She then obtained her first permanent position and worked at Kayser-Threde, a medium-sized space technology company in Munich, until 1999. In 1993, she completed additional studies at the International Space University in Alsace.

In 1999, Claudia Kessler moved to EADS as a manager at EADS Space Transportation. From 2004, she worked for HE Space Operations for 14 years as a recruiter for aerospace professionals. HE Space specializes in personnel recruitment with an exclusive focus on the space sector. The company itself has embraced gender equality and proven that a gender balance is also possible in technical professions: out of 200 technical employees, 55 percent are female.

In 2016, she began to drive forward the founding of the private initiative Die Astronautin, of which she has been managing director since 2017. The company has set itself the goal of bringing the first German woman to the International Space Station as an astronaut. From the original 400 female applicants who applied as candidates in 2016, meteorologist Insa Thiele-Eich and astrophysicist Suzanna Randall are preparing for a possible flight to the ISS.

Through her commitment in various leadership positions, Kessler has managed to strengthen the position of women in technological professions.

== Leadership roles ==
In 2009, Claudia Kessler, together with Simonetta Di Pippo, then Director of Space at the European Space Agency, founded the Women in Aerospace Europe (WIA-E) network, which promotes the international careers of women professionals and managers in aerospace and has more than 500 members in 12 European countries.

She is a member of the Senate of the Deutsche Gesellschaft für Luft- und Raumfahrt (DGLR) and the International Academy of Astronautics as well as a member of the plenum of the Bremen Chamber of Commerce.

== Awards ==
- 2016: Bremen Diversity Prize
- 2018: 25 women who are revolutionizing our economy
- 2019: Polarstern Prize from the Österreichisches Weltraum Forum
- 2019: Soroptimist Germany Prize
