= Johanna Maislinger =

Austrian aviator and engineer

- Born: 23 October 1985 (age 40)
- Occupation: Pilot
- Years active: 2005 – present

Johanna Maislinger (born 23 October 1985) is an Austrian aviator and engineer, currently employed by the German cargo carrier AeroLogic. Since 2010 she has flown Boeing 777-200F cargo jets, initially as a First Officer, as a Senior First Officer from 2011 and as a Captain since 2018. She achieved media prominence in 2018-2020 when she claimed to have secured financial and logistical backing to become a space tourist, on Soyuz MS-20, though she did not gain a seat on the mission. The Soyuz MS-20 mission launched 8 December 2021 without her on board.

== Early life and career ==
Maislinger grew up in the small Austrian town of Bad Goisern, Upper Austria. Her family own a substantial catering and hospitality business, based in Bad Goisern and the neighboring town of Bad Ischl. In 2004, she was accepted to the Lufthansa Group Flight School to train as a commercial pilot. After graduating in 2006, she joined Hamburg International as a First Officer and flew Boeing 737 and Airbus A320 aircraft across Europe. She completed a bachelor's degree in Technology Engineering.

In 2009, she joined the cargo carrier AeroLogic, and she began flying their Boeing 777-200F aircraft on long-haul services from Leipzig and Frankfurt, to Asia and the United States. Maislinger initially served as a First Officer, before being promoted to Senior First Officer in 2011, and to captain in 2018.

In 2013, she began part-time study at LMU Munich, for a doctorate in medicine, hoping to apply to the European Space Agency(ESA) as an astronaut. It was expected that ESA would begin their next round of astronaut recruitment in early 2021.

== German female astronaut project ==
In March 2016, a private campaign called Die Astronautin, was launched with the objective of finding, and flying, a female German astronaut before 2020. The organizers hoped to find corporate and private sponsors, who would finance a flight on a Russian, or American spacecraft. Maislinger was one of 400 applicants, who would be reduced to two finalists, based on a selection process overseen by the German Space Agency DLR. Although she was Austrian, she had lived, worked, and studied in Germany for many years, and hoped to obtain German citizenship before the final two finalists were chosen. However, before her nationality became a major issue, Maislinger was eliminated, after reaching the final 30 candidates, and she left the project.

== Space tourist project ==
In April 2017, Maislinger posted on social media that she had been invited to participate in another 'woman in space' project, which would see her sent into space on a Russian Soyuz spacecraft in 2019. The transaction was to be facilitated by the American company Space Adventures. Her main sponsor was said be an unknown, wealthy benefactor, based in Berlin. Other supporters, or sponsors, connected to the project included the Austrian company Red Bull, and their associate company Red Bull TV. In the event, the only available Soyuz seat in 2019, was sold to the United Arab Emirates Government.

After Space Adventures announced another Space Tourist contract in February 2019, which would use a seat on Soyuz MS-20 in December 2021, Maislinger's name became linked to the project. A blogpost reported that Space Adventures had confirmed that Maislinger was a client in contention for the spaceflight, but did not have funding.

In November 2020 The Space Review revealed that officials at Space Adventures had confirmed, unofficially, that Maislinger was still a candidate to be launched into Space onboard Soyuz MS-20 in December 2021, with experienced cosmonaut Alexander Misurkin and an unnamed Japanese woman. But in 2021 it was announced that Maislinger did not gain the seat.

In July 2021, Space Adventures's Moscow Office claimed that Maislinger had failed to raise the necessary funds, and they had not treated her as a serious candidate.

On 8 December 2021 the Soyuz MS-20 mission launched with cosmonaut Alexander Misurkin and two space tourists (both male), the Japanese billionaire Yusaku Maezawa and his assistant Yozo Hirano.

== Personal life ==
Away from her professional life, and studies, Maislinger regards herself as an Extreme Sports specialist. She holds aerobatics and seaplane pilot ratings, also participating in mountaineering, climbing, sky-diving, cross-country skiing as well as horse-riding.
