= Die Astronautin =

German human spaceflight program

- Formation: March 2016
- Founder: Private initiative
- Purpose: STEM outreach, private astronaut program
- Website: dieastronautin.de/en/

Die Astronautin was a private German human spaceflight program with the goal of sending the first German woman into space by 2023 via a short-duration flight to the International Space Station. The program was launched by a German private initiative in March 2016, when it sent out a call for German women to apply for a mission to the ISS. In 2024, it was reported that the project had failed. However, unrelated to this initiative, on the Fram2 mission in 2025, Rabea Rogge became the first female German astronaut.

== Mission ==
When the project was first established, the team planned for the first flight of a female German astronaut to occur by 2020, although this goal has been pushed back once to mid-2021, and again to 2023. The mission could take place on a Russian Soyuz spacecraft or one of two Commercial Crew Vehicles, either SpaceX's Crew Dragon or Boeing's CST-100 Starliner spacecraft. In October 2018 the project signed a memorandum of understanding with Axiom Space regarding astronaut training and flight opportunities. This could lead to the flight occurring on a SpaceX Crew Dragon flight contracted by Axiom.

== Astronauts ==
The program put out a call for astronauts in March 2016 and received over 400 applications from German women aged between 27 and 37, coming from STEM, military and other aviation backgrounds. By April they had narrowed the original 400 down to 120 candidates. One of the applicants who made it to the final group of 30 candidates was Austrian-German airline pilot Johanna Maislinger, a potential client of the American space tourism company Space Adventures, and a candidate spaceflight participant for the joint Space Adventures-Roscosmos Soyuz MS-20 mission in December 2021. She did not fly on the mission.

One year after the original call for applicants, the project announced the final six candidates who had been picked from the original pool of 400. The six finalists included a fighter pilot, a meteorologist and four engineers.

- Major Nicola Baumann – a German Air Force Eurofighter Typhoon pilot based out of Norvenich Air Base in North Rhine-Westphalia. She was born in Munich and has trained on fighter jets with the United States Air Force.
- Lisa Marie Haas – a development engineer with the Bosch company based out of Reutlingen from Nürtingen, Baden-Württemberg. She holds a PhD in Theoretical physics from the University of Heidelberg,
- Susanne Peters – an aerospace engineer from Potsdam working at the aerospace engineering research department at the University of the German Federal Armed Forces in space debris removal. At the time of the announcement she was working towards a PhD at the German Armed Forces University.
- Suzanna Randall – an astrophysicist from Cologne, at the time of the announcement she was working at the European Southern Observatory near Munich. She has also worked for the ALMA project in Chile and received her degree from the University of Montreal in Canada.
- Insa Thiele-Eich – a meteorologist from Heidenburg, working as the scientific coordinator for her alma mater, the University of Bonn, where she earned her PhD in meteorology. She is the daughter of former German ESA astronaut Gerhard P.J. Thiele, who flew on STS-99 in 2000.
- Magdalena Pree – A German-Austrian citizen from Passau, she studied aerospace engineering at the Technical University of Munich and at the time of announcement she was working for the German Aerospace Center (DLR) at the Galileo satellite control center in near Munich, controlling the European Galileo satellite navigation system.

=== Final selection ===
The next month the project announced their final two candidates, one of whom would fly the mission with the other acting as her backup. After over a year of selection Thiele-Eich and Baumann were selected from the original pool of 400 candidates. In August 2017 the two traveled to Star City, Russia for their first round of training, which included Parabolic flight "Zero-G" training, medical training, and Russian language instruction. Thiele-Eich also trained to obtain her pilots license as part of the trip, which was not needed for Baumann who was already a professional pilot.

In April 2018, the organization announced that Baumann had pulled out of training with the project. Her replacement was Suzanna Randall, one of the original six finalists.
