= Sortie (disambiguation) =

A sortie is a brief excursion of a military unit.

Sortie may also refer to:

- Lunar sortie
- Campaign sortie, a brief public event usually referred to as an election campaign rally
- Soldiers Sortie, a Chinese TV drama
- Sortie (album), a 1966 album by saxophonist Steve Lacy
