= Maislinger =

Maislinger is a surname. Notable people with the surname include:

- Adolf Maislinger (1903–1985), well-known prisoner of the Dachau concentration camp
- Andreas Maislinger (born 1955), Austrian historian, political scientist, and founder of the Austrian Holocaust Memorial Service
- Johanna Maislinger (born 1985), Austrian aviator and engineer
