= 2025 Suzuka 1000 km =

Sports car race in Suzuka, Japan

(Japan) Suzuka 1000 km 2025
Event information
- Round 4 of 5 in the 2025 Intercontinental GT Challenge
- Date: 14 September 2025
- Location: Suzuka, Mie Prefecture, Japan
- Venue: Suzuka Circuit
- Duration: 6 hours, 30 minutes
- Weather: Fine

Results
- Laps completed: 170
- Distance: 987.19 km (613.41 mi)

Pole position
- Time: 2:00.658 (3 lap average)
- Team: (Belgium) No. 32 Team WRT
- Drivers: (South Africa) Kelvin van der Linde (Switzerland) Raffaele Marciello (Belgium) Charles Weerts

Winners
- Time: 6:30:27.081
- Team: (Belgium) No. 32 Team WRT
- Drivers: (South Africa) Kelvin van der Linde (Switzerland) Raffaele Marciello (Belgium) Charles Weerts

The 2025 Suzuka 1000 km took place on 14 September 2025 at the Suzuka Circuit in Suzuka, Japan. It was the 49th edition of the Suzuka 1000km, the fourth round of the 2025 Intercontinental GT Challenge, and the first after a five-year hiatus due to the effects of the COVID-19 pandemic.

== Entry list ==
A provisional entry list was announced on 18 July, featuring 30 entries. Eight manufacturers were represented: 11 Porsche cars (10 Porsche 911 GT3 R (992) and 1 Porsche 911 GT3 R (991.2)), 7 Mercedes cars, 4 Ferrari cars, 3 Corvette cars (2 Chevrolet Corvette Z06 GT3.R and 1 Callaway Corvette C7 GT3-R), 2 Nissan cars, and 1 car each from Audi, BMW, and Lamborghini.

An updated list was revealed on 18 August, with the grid expanded to 33 entries. Team WRT entered with two BMW M4 GT3 Evos, plus K-tunes Racing with their Ferrari, and RunUp Sports' Nissan. The only Lamborghini dropped off the grid after Absolute Racing switched its Huracán GT3 EVO2 to a Porsche 911 GT3 R, while Herberth Motorsports' second Porsche withdrew.

Super GT teams were allowed to enter GTA-GT300 regulation vehicles after an agreement between SRO and the GT Association (GTA) was reached in late 2024. However, no GTA-GT300 cars entered the race.

No.	Entrant	Car	Driver 1	Driver 2	Driver 3
Pro (11 entries)
00	(Japan) Goodsmile Racing	Mercedes-AMG GT3 Evo	(Japan) Tatsuya Kataoka	(Japan) Kamui Kobayashi	(Japan) Nobuteru Taniguchi
2	(Malaysia) Johor Motorsports JMR	Chevrolet Corvette Z06 GT3.R	(Netherlands) Nicky Catsburg	(United States) Scott McLaughlin (Note: Scott McLaughlin was born in New Zealand but competed with an ACCUS-FIA license as a North Carolina-domeciled driver.)	(United Kingdom) Alexander Sims
6	(China) Origine Motorsport	Porsche 911 GT3 R (992)	(Denmark) Bastian Buus	(Germany) Laurin Heinrich	(Belgium) Alessio Picariello
7	(Hong Kong) Absolute Racing	Porsche 911 GT3 R (992)	(France) Kévin Estre	(France) Patrick Pilet	(Belgium) Laurens Vanthoor
23	(China) Phantom Global Racing	Porsche 911 GT3 R (992)	(Austria) Klaus Bachler	(France) Dorian Boccolacci	(Switzerland) Patric Niederhauser
30	(Japan) Team Handwork Challenge	Nissan GT-R Nismo GT3	(Japan) Iori Kimura	(Japan) Atsushi Miyake	(Japan) Daiki Sasaki
31	(Belgium) Team WRT	BMW M4 GT3 Evo	(Brazil) Augusto Farfus	(United Kingdom) Dan Harper	(Germany) Max Hesse
32	(Belgium) Team WRT	BMW M4 GT3 Evo	(South Africa) Kelvin van der Linde	(Switzerland) Raffaele Marciello	(Belgium) Charles Weerts
61	(New Zealand) EBM GIGA Racing	Porsche 911 GT3 R (992)	(Malaysia) Adrian D'Silva	(United Kingdom) Harry King	(Germany) Sven Müller
77	(Hong Kong) Mercedes-AMG Team Craft-Bamboo Racing	Mercedes-AMG GT3 Evo	(Estonia) Ralf Aron	(Germany) Maximilian Götz	(Japan) Kakunoshin Ohta
888	(Hong Kong) Mercedes-AMG Team GMR	Mercedes-AMG GT3 Evo	(Canada) Mikael Grenier	(Belgium) Maxime Martin	(Germany) Luca Stolz
Silver (3 entries)
14	(Hong Kong) Audi Sport Asia Team Phantom	Audi R8 LMS Evo II	(China) Cheng Congfu	(China) Deng Yi	(China) Yu Kuai
33	(South Korea) Vollgas Motorsports	Porsche 911 GT3 R (992)	(Netherlands) "Daan Arrow"	(South Korea) Jongpil Kim	(China) Liang Jiatong
500	(Japan) Team 5ZIGEN	Nissan GT-R Nismo GT3	(Japan) Takayuki Aoki	(Japan) Yu Kanamaru	(Japan) Yuya Motojima
Bronze (12 entries)
9	(Japan) Bingo Racing	Callaway Corvette C7 GT3-R	(Japan) Reimei Ito	(Japan) Ukyo Sasahara	(Japan) Shinji Takei
10	(Hong Kong) Absolute Racing	Porsche 911 GT3 R (992)	(Hong Kong) Antares Au	(Netherlands) Loek Hartog	(Austria) Richard Lietz
13	(China) Phantom Global Racing	Porsche 911 GT3 R (992)	(Hong Kong) Adderly Fong	(China) "JZ"	(Germany) Nico Menzel
18	(Japan) Porsche Center Okazaki/Nine Racing	Porsche 911 GT3 R (992)	(Japan) Kazuto Kotaka	(Japan) Hiroaki Nagai	(Japan) Takuro Shinohara
21	(China) Harmony Racing	Ferrari 296 GT3	(United States) Dustin Blattner	(Germany) Dennis Marschall	(Italy) Lorenzo Patrese
27	(United States) Heart of Racing by SPS	Mercedes-AMG GT3 Evo	(United Kingdom) Ian James	(Spain) Alex Riberas	(Canada) Zacharie Robichon
75	(United States) 75 Express (Note: Kenny Habul, and his team 75 Express are Australian, but he competes under an American license.)	Mercedes-AMG GT3 Evo	(Austria) Dominik Baumann	(United States) Kenny Habul	(Switzerland) Yannick Mettler
86	(China) Origine Motorsport	Porsche 911 GT3 R (992)	(Denmark) Anders Fjordbach	(China) Kerong Li	(China) Leo Ye Hongli
89	(China) Team KRC	BMW M4 GT3 Evo	(Netherlands) Maxime Oosten	(China) Ruan Cunfan	(United States) Neil Verhagen
91	(Germany) Herberth Motorsport	Porsche 911 GT3 R (992)	(Germany) Ralf Bohn	(Germany) Alfred Renauer	(Germany) Robert Renauer
98	(Japan) K-tunes Racing	Ferrari 296 GT3	(Japan) Shinichi Takagi	(United Kingdom) Sean Walkinshaw	(Japan) Daisuke Yamawaki
555	(Japan) Maezawa Racing	Ferrari 296 GT3	(Japan) Yusaku Maezawa	(France) Thomas Neubauer	(Japan) Naoki Yokomizo
Pro-Am (5 entries)
28	(Hong Kong) Craft-Bamboo Racing	Mercedes-AMG GT3 Evo	(United Kingdom) Ben Barnicoat	(Hong Kong) Jonathan Hui	(Hong Kong) Kevin Tse
45	(Japan) Ponos Racing	Ferrari 296 GT3	(Japan) Kei Cozzolino	(Japan) Yorikatsu Tsujiko	(Japan) Yusuke Yamasaki
60	(Japan) LM corsa	Ferrari 296 GT3	(Italy) Giancarlo Fisichella	(Japan) Kei Nakanishi	(Japan) Shigekazu Wakisaka
69	(Germany) GetSpeed	Mercedes-AMG GT3 Evo	(Switzerland) Philip Ellis	(Luxembourg) Steve Jans	(United States) Anthony McIntosh
99	(Malaysia) Johor Motorsports JMR	Chevrolet Corvette Z06 GT3.R	(Malaysia) Prince Abu Bakar Ibrahim	(Malaysia) Prince Jefri Ibrahim	(Finland) Konsta Lappalainen
Am (2 entries)
51	(Australia) AMAC Motorsport	Porsche 911 GT3 R (991.2)	(Australia) Grant Denyer	(Australia) Andrew Macpherson	(Australia) William Ben Porter
360	(Japan) RunUp Sports	Nissan GT-R Nismo GT3	(Japan) Masaaki Nishikawa	(Japan) Yusaku Shibata	(Japan) Atsushi Tanaka

- Hiromasa "Hirobon" Kitano was scheduled to compete for Team 5Zigen, but he was replaced by 2024 Super GT GT300 champion Yuya Motojima.
- Takuya Otaki was scheduled to compete for RunUp Sports, but he was replaced by Yusaku Shibata. And with the driver change, the team switched from Pro-Am class to Am class.

== Qualifying ==
The grid was determined by the average time of all three drivers. Every class pole sitter's denoted in bold and with ‡

Pos	Class	No.	Team	Car	Drivers	Time	Avg. Time
1	P	**32**	**(Belgium) Team WRT**	**BMW M4 GT3 Evo**	**(Switzerland) Raffaele Marciello**	**2:00.251**	**2:00.658‡**
1	P	**32**	**(Belgium) Team WRT**	**BMW M4 GT3 Evo**	**(Belgium) Charles Weerts**	**2:01.357**	**2:00.658‡**
1	P	**32**	**(Belgium) Team WRT**	**BMW M4 GT3 Evo**	**(South Africa) Kelvin van der Linde**	**2:00.367**	**2:00.658‡**
2	P	888	(Hong Kong) Mercedes-AMG Team GMR	Mercedes-AMG GT3 Evo	(Belgium) Maxime Martin	2:00.545	2:01.176
2	P	888	(Hong Kong) Mercedes-AMG Team GMR	Mercedes-AMG GT3 Evo	(Canada) Mikael Grenier	2:01.361	2:01.176
2	P	888	(Hong Kong) Mercedes-AMG Team GMR	Mercedes-AMG GT3 Evo	(Germany) Luca Stolz	2:01.622	2:01.176
3	S	**14**	**(Hong Kong) Audi Sport Asia Team Phantom**	**Audi R8 LMS Evo II**	**(China) Deng Yi**	**2:00.953**	**2:01.416‡**
3	S	**14**	**(Hong Kong) Audi Sport Asia Team Phantom**	**Audi R8 LMS Evo II**	**(China) Yu Kuai**	**2:01.074**	**2:01.416‡**
3	S	**14**	**(Hong Kong) Audi Sport Asia Team Phantom**	**Audi R8 LMS Evo II**	**(China) Cheng Congfu**	**2:02.221**	**2:01.416‡**
4	P	6	(China) Origine Motorsport	Porsche 911 GT3 R (992)	(Germany) Laurin Heinrich	2:00.821	2:01.443
4	P	6	(China) Origine Motorsport	Porsche 911 GT3 R (992)	(Belgium) Alessio Picariello	2:01.681	2:01.443
4	P	6	(China) Origine Motorsport	Porsche 911 GT3 R (992)	(Denmark) Bastian Buus	2:01.827	2:01.443
5	P	7	(Hong Kong) Absolute Racing	Porsche 911 GT3 R (992)	(France) Kévin Estre	2:00.936	2:01.444
5	P	7	(Hong Kong) Absolute Racing	Porsche 911 GT3 R (992)	(Belgium) Laurens Vanthoor	2:01.257	2:01.444
5	P	7	(Hong Kong) Absolute Racing	Porsche 911 GT3 R (992)	(France) Patrick Pilet	2:02.139	2:01.444
6	B	**21**	**(China) Harmony Racing**	**Ferrari 296 GT3**	**(Italy) Lorenzo Patrese**	**2:00.484**	**2:01.479‡**
6	B	**21**	**(China) Harmony Racing**	**Ferrari 296 GT3**	**(Germany) Dennis Marschall**	**2:01.102**	**2:01.479‡**
6	B	**21**	**(China) Harmony Racing**	**Ferrari 296 GT3**	**(United States) Dustin Blattner**	**2:02.852**	**2:01.479‡**
7	S	500	(Japan) Team 5ZIGEN	Nissan GT-R Nismo GT3	(Japan) Yuya Motojima	2:01.181	2:01.557
7	S	500	(Japan) Team 5ZIGEN	Nissan GT-R Nismo GT3	(Japan) Yu Kanamaru	2:01.211	2:01.557
7	S	500	(Japan) Team 5ZIGEN	Nissan GT-R Nismo GT3	(Japan) Takayuki Aoki	2:02.281	2:01.557
8	P	51	(Belgium) Team WRT	BMW M4 GT3 Evo	(Brazil) Augusto Farfus	2:01.211	2:01.622
8	P	51	(Belgium) Team WRT	BMW M4 GT3 Evo	(United Kingdom) Dan Harper	2:01.793	2:01.622
8	P	51	(Belgium) Team WRT	BMW M4 GT3 Evo	(Germany) Max Hesse	2:01.864	2:01.622
9	P	2	(Malaysia) Johor Motorsports Racing JMR	Chevrolet Corvette Z06 GT3.R	(Netherlands) Nicky Catsburg	1:59.936	2:01.648
9	P	2	(Malaysia) Johor Motorsports Racing JMR	Chevrolet Corvette Z06 GT3.R	(United States) Scott McLaughlin	2:01.195	2:01.648
9	P	2	(Malaysia) Johor Motorsports Racing JMR	Chevrolet Corvette Z06 GT3.R	(United Kingdom) Alexander Sims	2:03.813	2:01.648
10	B	75	(United States) 75 Express	Mercedes-AMG GT3 Evo	(Austria) Dominik Baumann	2:00.637	2:01.968
10	B	75	(United States) 75 Express	Mercedes-AMG GT3 Evo	(Switzerland) Yannick Mettler	2:01.496	2:01.968
10	B	75	(United States) 75 Express	Mercedes-AMG GT3 Evo	(United States) Kenny Habul	2:03.772	2:01.968
11	P	11	(China) Phantom Global Racing	Porsche 911 GT3 R (992)	(Austria) Klaus Bachler	2:01.506	2:02.043
11	P	11	(China) Phantom Global Racing	Porsche 911 GT3 R (992)	(France) Dorian Boccolacci	2:02.034	2:02.043
11	P	11	(China) Phantom Global Racing	Porsche 911 GT3 R (992)	(Switzerland) Patric Niederhauser	2:02.589	2:02.043
12	PA	**60**	**(Japan) LM corsa**	**Ferrari 296 GT3**	**(Italy) Giancarlo Fisichella**	**2:00.441**	**2:02.142‡**
12	PA	**60**	**(Japan) LM corsa**	**Ferrari 296 GT3**	**(Japan) Shigekazu Wakisaka**	**2:02.549**	**2:02.142‡**
12	PA	**60**	**(Japan) LM corsa**	**Ferrari 296 GT3**	**(Japan) Kei Nakanishi**	**2:03.438**	**2:02.142‡**
13	B	9	(Japan) Bingo Racing	Callaway Corvette C7 GT3-R	(Japan) Ukyo Sasahara	2:00.812	2:02.562
13	B	9	(Japan) Bingo Racing	Callaway Corvette C7 GT3-R	(Japan) Reimei Ito	2:01.604	2:02.562
13	B	9	(Japan) Bingo Racing	Callaway Corvette C7 GT3-R	(Japan) Shinji Takei	2:05.270	2:02.562
14	B	89	(China) Team KRC	BMW M4 GT3 Evo	(Netherlands) Maxime Oosten	2:01.484	2:02.642
14	B	89	(China) Team KRC	BMW M4 GT3 Evo	(United States) Neil Verhagen	2:01.851	2:02.642
14	B	89	(China) Team KRC	BMW M4 GT3 Evo	(China) Ruan Cunfan	2:04.591	2:02.642
15	B	10	(Hong Kong) Absolute Racing	Porsche 911 GT3 R (992)	(Netherlands) Loek Hartog	2:01.355	2:02.654
15	B	10	(Hong Kong) Absolute Racing	Porsche 911 GT3 R (992)	(Austria) Richard Lietz	2:02.302	2:02.654
15	B	10	(Hong Kong) Absolute Racing	Porsche 911 GT3 R (992)	(Hong Kong) Antares Au	2:04.307	2:02.654
16	B	91	(Germany) Herberth Motorsport	Porsche 911 GT3 R (992)	(Germany) Robert Renauer	2:01.88	2:02.742
16	B	91	(Germany) Herberth Motorsport	Porsche 911 GT3 R (992)	(Germany) Alfred Renauer	2:02.222	2:02.742
16	B	91	(Germany) Herberth Motorsport	Porsche 911 GT3 R (992)	(Germany) Ralf Bohn	2:04.116	2:02.742
17	B	555	(Japan) Maezawa Racing	Ferrari 296 GT3	(France) Thomas Neubauer	2:01.392	2:02.818
17	B	555	(Japan) Maezawa Racing	Ferrari 296 GT3	(Japan) Naoki Yokomizo	2:01.437	2:02.818
17	B	555	(Japan) Maezawa Racing	Ferrari 296 GT3	(Japan) Yusaku Maezawa	2:05.625	2:02.818
18	B	13	(China) Phantom Global Racing	Porsche 911 GT3 R (992)	(Germany) Nico Menzel	2:02.058	2:03.098
18	B	13	(China) Phantom Global Racing	Porsche 911 GT3 R (992)	(Hong Kong) Adderly Fong	2:02.370	2:03.098
18	B	13	(China) Phantom Global Racing	Porsche 911 GT3 R (992)	(China) "JZ"	2:04.867	2:03.098
19	PA	45	(Japan) Ponos Racing	Ferrari 296 GT3	(Japan) Kei Cozzolino	2:00.798	2:03.177
19	PA	45	(Japan) Ponos Racing	Ferrari 296 GT3	(Japan) Yusuke Yamasaki	2:04.332	2:03.177
19	PA	45	(Japan) Ponos Racing	Ferrari 296 GT3	(Japan) Yorikatsu Tsujiko	2:04.401	2:03.177
20	B	86	(China) Origine Motorsport	Porsche 911 GT3 R (992)	(Denmark) Anders Fjordbach	2:01.686	2:03.191
20	B	86	(China) Origine Motorsport	Porsche 911 GT3 R (992)	(China) Leo Ye Hongli	2:03.364	2:03.191
20	B	86	(China) Origine Motorsport	Porsche 911 GT3 R (992)	(China) Kerong Li	2:04.525	2:03.191
21	P	30	(Japan) Team HandWork Challenge	Nissan GT-R Nismo GT3	(Japan) Atsushi Miyake	2:02.061	2:03.243
21	P	30	(Japan) Team HandWork Challenge	Nissan GT-R Nismo GT3	(Japan) Iori Kimura	2:02.263	2:03.243
21	P	30	(Japan) Team HandWork Challenge	Nissan GT-R Nismo GT3	(Japan) Daiki Sasaki	2:05.405	2:03.243
22	B	27	(United States) Heart of Racing by SPS	Mercedes-AMG GT3 Evo	(Canada) Zacharie Robichon	2:02.634	2:03.283
22	B	27	(United States) Heart of Racing by SPS	Mercedes-AMG GT3 Evo	(Spain) Alex Riberas	2:02.894	2:03.283
22	B	27	(United States) Heart of Racing by SPS	Mercedes-AMG GT3 Evo	(United States) Ian James	2:04.321	2:03.283
23	PA	69	(Germany) GetSpeed	Mercedes-AMG GT3 Evo	(Switzerland) Philip Ellis	2:02.152	2:03.387
23	PA	69	(Germany) GetSpeed	Mercedes-AMG GT3 Evo	(Luxembourg) Steve Jans	2:04.628	2:03.387
23	PA	69	(Germany) GetSpeed	Mercedes-AMG GT3 Evo	(United States) Anthony McIntosh	2:03.383	2:03.387
24	P	00	(Japan) Goodsmile Racing	Mercedes-AMG GT3 Evo	(Japan) Kamui Kobayashi	2:01.361	2:03.750
24	P	00	(Japan) Goodsmile Racing	Mercedes-AMG GT3 Evo	(Japan) Nobuteru Taniguchi	2:02.897	2:03.750
24	P	00	(Japan) Goodsmile Racing	Mercedes-AMG GT3 Evo	(Japan) Tatsuya Kataoka	2:06.994	2:03.750
25	B	98	(Japan) K-tunes Racing	Ferrari 296 GT3	(United Kingdom) Sean Walkinshaw	2:01.891	2:03.943
25	B	98	(Japan) K-tunes Racing	Ferrari 296 GT3	(Japan) Shinichi Takagi	2:04.663	2:03.943
25	B	98	(Japan) K-tunes Racing	Ferrari 296 GT3	(Japan) Daisuke Yamawaki	2:05.275	2:03.943
26	PA	99	(Malaysia) Johor Motorsports Racing JMR	Chevrolet Corvette Z06 GT3.R	(Finland) Konsta Lappalainen	2:03.784	2:04.428
26	PA	99	(Malaysia) Johor Motorsports Racing JMR	Chevrolet Corvette Z06 GT3.R	(Malaysia) Prince Abu Bakar Ibrahim	2:03.871	2:04.428
26	PA	99	(Malaysia) Johor Motorsports Racing JMR	Chevrolet Corvette Z06 GT3.R	(Malaysia) Prince Jefri Ibrahim	2:05.630	2:04.428
27	B	18	(Japan) Porsche Center Okazaki/Nine Racing	Porsche 911 GT3 R (991.2)	(Japan) Kazuto Kotaka	2:01.597	2:04.555
27	B	18	(Japan) Porsche Center Okazaki/Nine Racing	Porsche 911 GT3 R (991.2)	(Japan) Hiroaki Nagai	2:03.740	2:04.555
27	B	18	(Japan) Porsche Center Okazaki/Nine Racing	Porsche 911 GT3 R (991.2)	(Japan) Takuro Shinohara	2:08.328	2:04.555
28	P	77	(Hong Kong) Mercedes-AMG Team Craft-Bamboo Racing	Mercedes-AMG GT3 Evo	(Germany) Maximilian Götz	2:01.519	2:05.692
28	P	77	(Hong Kong) Mercedes-AMG Team Craft-Bamboo Racing	Mercedes-AMG GT3 Evo	(Estonia) Ralf Aron	2:02.689	2:05.692
28	P	77	(Hong Kong) Mercedes-AMG Team Craft-Bamboo Racing	Mercedes-AMG GT3 Evo	(Japan) Kakunoshin Ohta	2:12.870	2:05.692
29	Am	**51**	**(Australia) AMAC Motorsport**	**Porsche 911 GT3 R (991.2)**	**(Australia) William Ben Porter**	**2:04.115**	**2:06.146‡**
29	Am	**51**	**(Australia) AMAC Motorsport**	**Porsche 911 GT3 R (991.2)**	**(Australia) Grant Denyer**	**2:05.558**	**2:06.146‡**
29	Am	**51**	**(Australia) AMAC Motorsport**	**Porsche 911 GT3 R (991.2)**	**(Australia) Andrew Macpherson**	**2:08.765**	**2:06.146‡**
30	S	33	(South Korea) Vollgas Motorsport	Porsche 911 GT3 R (992)	(China) Liang Jiatong	2:03.995	2:05.617
30	S	33	(South Korea) Vollgas Motorsport	Porsche 911 GT3 R (992)	(South Korea) Jongpil Kim	2:07.239	2:05.617
30	S	33	(South Korea) Vollgas Motorsport	Porsche 911 GT3 R (992)	(Netherlands) "Daan Arrow"	No time set	2:05.617
31	Am	360	(Japan) RunUp Sports	Nissan GT-R Nismo GT3	(Japan) Atsushi Tanaka	2:06.797	2:08.898
31	Am	360	(Japan) RunUp Sports	Nissan GT-R Nismo GT3	(Japan) Masaaki Nishikawa	2:11.000	2:08.898
31	Am	360	(Japan) RunUp Sports	Nissan GT-R Nismo GT3	(Japan) Yusaku Shibata	No time set	2:08.898
32	PA	28	(Hong Kong) Craft-Bamboo Racing	Mercedes-AMG GT3 Evo	(Hong Kong) Jonathan Hui	2:02.847	2:02.847
32	PA	28	(Hong Kong) Craft-Bamboo Racing	Mercedes-AMG GT3 Evo	(Hong Kong) Kevin Tse	No time set	2:02.847
32	PA	28	(Hong Kong) Craft-Bamboo Racing	Mercedes-AMG GT3 Evo	(United Kingdom) Ben Barnicoat	No time set	2:02.847
33	P	61	(New Zealand) EBM GIGA Racing	Porsche 911 GT3 R (992)	(Malaysia) Adrian D'Silva	No time set	No time set
33	P	61	(New Zealand) EBM GIGA Racing	Porsche 911 GT3 R (992)	(United Kingdom) Harry King	No time set	No time set
33	P	61	(New Zealand) EBM GIGA Racing	Porsche 911 GT3 R (992)	(Germany) Sven Müller	No time set	No time set

Icon	Class
**P**	Pro Cup
**S**	Silver Cup
**B**	Bronze Cup
**PA**	Pro-Am Cup
**Am**	Am Cup

== Race results ==
Class winners denoted in bold and with ‡

Pos	Class	No.	Team	Drivers	Car	Laps	Time/Retired
Pos	Class	No.	Team	Drivers	Engine	Laps	Time/Retired
1	P	**32**	**(Belgium) Team WRT**	**(South Africa) Kelvin van der Linde (Switzerland) Raffaele Marciello (Belgium) Charles Weerts**	**BMW M4 GT3 Evo**	**170**	**6:30:27.081‡**
1	P	**32**	**(Belgium) Team WRT**	**(South Africa) Kelvin van der Linde (Switzerland) Raffaele Marciello (Belgium) Charles Weerts**	**BMW P58 3.0 L Twin-turbo I6**	**170**	**6:30:27.081‡**
2	P	7	(Hong Kong) Absolute Racing	(France) Kévin Estre (France) Patrick Pilet (Belgium) Laurens Vanthoor	Porsche 911 GT3 R (992)	170	+13.647
2	P	7	(Hong Kong) Absolute Racing	(France) Kévin Estre (France) Patrick Pilet (Belgium) Laurens Vanthoor	Porsche M97/80 4.2 L Flat-6	170	+13.647
3	P	2	(Malaysia) Johor Motorsports Racing JMR	(Netherlands) Nicky Catsburg (United States) Scott McLaughlin (United Kingdom) Alexander Sims	Chevrolet Corvette Z06 GT3.R	170	+45.859
3	P	2	(Malaysia) Johor Motorsports Racing JMR	(Netherlands) Nicky Catsburg (United States) Scott McLaughlin (United Kingdom) Alexander Sims	Chevrolet LT6 5.5 L V8	170	+45.859
4	B	**10**	**(Hong Kong) Absolute Racing**	**(Hong Kong) Antares Au (Netherlands) Loek Hartog (Austria) Richard Lietz**	**Porsche 911 GT3 R (992)**	**170**	**+46.122‡**
4	B	**10**	**(Hong Kong) Absolute Racing**	**(Hong Kong) Antares Au (Netherlands) Loek Hartog (Austria) Richard Lietz**	**Porsche M97/80 4.2 L Flat-6**	**170**	**+46.122‡**
5	P	6	(China) Origine Motorsport	(Denmark) Bastian Buus (Germany) Laurin Heinrich (Belgium) Alessio Picariello	Porsche 911 GT3 R (992)	170	+1:12.800
5	P	6	(China) Origine Motorsport	(Denmark) Bastian Buus (Germany) Laurin Heinrich (Belgium) Alessio Picariello	Porsche M97/80 4.2 L Flat-6	170	+1:12.800
6	P	31	(Belgium) Team WRT	(Brazil) Augusto Farfus (United Kingdom) Dan Harper (Germany) Max Hesse	BMW M4 GT3 Evo	170	+1:13.098
6	P	31	(Belgium) Team WRT	(Brazil) Augusto Farfus (United Kingdom) Dan Harper (Germany) Max Hesse	BMW P58 3.0 L Twin-turbo I6	170	+1:13.098
7	P	888	(Hong Kong) Mercedes-AMG Team GMR	(Canada) Mikael Grenier (Belgium) Maxime Martin (Germany) Luca Stolz	Mercedes-AMG GT3 Evo	170	+1:13.972
7	P	888	(Hong Kong) Mercedes-AMG Team GMR	(Canada) Mikael Grenier (Belgium) Maxime Martin (Germany) Luca Stolz	Mercedes-Benz M159 6.2 L V8	170	+1:13.972
8	P	7	(China) Phantom Global Racing	(Austria) Klaus Bachler (France) Dorian Boccolacci (Switzerland) Patric Niederhauser	Porsche 911 GT3 R (992)	170	+1:19.457
8	P	7	(China) Phantom Global Racing	(Austria) Klaus Bachler (France) Dorian Boccolacci (Switzerland) Patric Niederhauser	Porsche M97/80 4.2 L Flat-6	170	+1:19.457
9	B	89	(China) Team KRC	(Netherlands) Maxime Oosten (China) Ruan Cunfan (United States) Neil Verhagen	BMW M4 GT3 Evo	170	+1:20.451
9	B	89	(China) Team KRC	(Netherlands) Maxime Oosten (China) Ruan Cunfan (United States) Neil Verhagen	BMW P58 3.0 L Twin-turbo I6	170	+1:20.451
10	P	77	(Hong Kong) Mercedes-AMG Team Craft-Bamboo Racing	(Estonia) Ralf Aron (Germany) Maximilian Götz (Japan) Kakunoshin Ohta	Mercedes-AMG GT3 Evo	170	+1:29.066
10	P	77	(Hong Kong) Mercedes-AMG Team Craft-Bamboo Racing	(Estonia) Ralf Aron (Germany) Maximilian Götz (Japan) Kakunoshin Ohta	Mercedes-Benz M159 6.2 L V8	170	+1:29.066
11	B	11	(Germany) Herberth Motorsport	(Germany) Ralf Bohn (Germany) Alfred Renauer (Germany) Robert Renauer	Porsche 911 GT3 R (992)	170	+1:30.305
11	B	11	(Germany) Herberth Motorsport	(Germany) Ralf Bohn (Germany) Alfred Renauer (Germany) Robert Renauer	Porsche M97/80 4.2 L Flat-6	170	+1:30.305
12	P	11	(New Zealand) EBM GIGA Racing	(Malaysia) Adrian D'Silva (United Kingdom) Harry King (Germany) Sven Müller	Porsche 911 GT3 R (992)	169	+1 Lap
12	P	11	(New Zealand) EBM GIGA Racing	(Malaysia) Adrian D'Silva (United Kingdom) Harry King (Germany) Sven Müller	Porsche M97/80 4.2 L Flat-6	169	+1 Lap
13	B	75	(United States) 75 Express	(Austria) Dominik Baumann (United States) Kenny Habul (Switzerland) Yannick Mettler	Mercedes-AMG GT3 Evo	169	+1 Lap
13	B	75	(United States) 75 Express	(Austria) Dominik Baumann (United States) Kenny Habul (Switzerland) Yannick Mettler	Mercedes-Benz M159 6.2 L V8	169	+1 Lap
14	B	18	(Japan) Porsche Center Okazaki/Nine Racing	(Japan) Kazuto Kotaka (Japan) Hiroaki Nagai (Japan) Takuro Shinohara	Porsche 911 GT3 R (992)	169	+1 Lap
14	B	18	(Japan) Porsche Center Okazaki/Nine Racing	(Japan) Kazuto Kotaka (Japan) Hiroaki Nagai (Japan) Takuro Shinohara	Porsche M97/80 4.2 L Flat-6	169	+1 Lap
15	S	**10**	**(Japan) Team 5ZIGEN**	**(Japan) Takayuki Aoki (Japan) Yu Kanamaru (Japan) Yuya Motojima**	**Nissan GT-R Nismo GT3**	**169**	**+1 Lap‡**
15	S	**10**	**(Japan) Team 5ZIGEN**	**(Japan) Takayuki Aoki (Japan) Yu Kanamaru (Japan) Yuya Motojima**	**Nissan VR38DETT 3.8 L Twin Turbo V6**	**169**	**+1 Lap‡**
16	P	00	(Japan) Goodsmile Racing	(Japan) Tatsuya Kataoka (Japan) Kamui Kobayashi (Japan) Nobuteru Taniguchi	Mercedes-AMG GT3 Evo	169	+1 Lap
16	P	00	(Japan) Goodsmile Racing	(Japan) Tatsuya Kataoka (Japan) Kamui Kobayashi (Japan) Nobuteru Taniguchi	Mercedes-Benz M159 6.2 L V8	169	+1 Lap
17	PA	**28**	**(Hong Kong) Craft-Bamboo Racing**	**(United Kingdom) Ben Barnicoat (Hong Kong) Jonathan Hui (Hong Kong) Kevin Tse**	**Mercedes-AMG GT3 Evo**	**168**	**+2 Laps‡**
17	PA	**28**	**(Hong Kong) Craft-Bamboo Racing**	**(United Kingdom) Ben Barnicoat (Hong Kong) Jonathan Hui (Hong Kong) Kevin Tse**	**Mercedes-Benz M159 6.2 L V8**	**168**	**+2 Laps‡**
18	PA	69	(Germany) GetSpeed	(Switzerland) Philip Ellis (Luxembourg) Steve Jans (United States) Anthony McIntosh	Mercedes-AMG GT3 Evo	168	+2 Laps
18	PA	69	(Germany) GetSpeed	(Switzerland) Philip Ellis (Luxembourg) Steve Jans (United States) Anthony McIntosh	Mercedes-Benz M159 6.2 L V8	168	+2 Laps
19	B	18	(China) Origine Motorsport	(Denmark) Anders Fjordbach (China) Kerong Li (China) Leo Ye Hongli	Porsche 911 GT3 R (992)	168	+2 Laps
19	B	18	(China) Origine Motorsport	(Denmark) Anders Fjordbach (China) Kerong Li (China) Leo Ye Hongli	Porsche M97/80 4.2 L Flat-6	168	+2 Laps
20	PA	99	(Malaysia) Johor Motorsports Racing JMR	(Malaysia) Prince Jefri Ibrahim (Malaysia) Prince Abu Bakar Ibrahim (Finland) Konsta Lappalainen	Chevrolet Corvette Z06 GT3.R	167	+3 Laps
20	PA	99	(Malaysia) Johor Motorsports Racing JMR	(Malaysia) Prince Jefri Ibrahim (Malaysia) Prince Abu Bakar Ibrahim (Finland) Konsta Lappalainen	Chevrolet LT6 5.5 L V8	167	+3 Laps
21	B	27	(United States) Heart of Racing by SPS	(United States) Ian James (Spain) Alex Riberas (Canada) Zacharie Robichon	Mercedes-AMG GT3 Evo	167	+3 Laps
21	B	27	(United States) Heart of Racing by SPS	(United States) Ian James (Spain) Alex Riberas (Canada) Zacharie Robichon	Mercedes-Benz M159 6.2 L V8	167	+3 Laps
22	B	21	(China) Harmony Racing	(United States) Dustin Blattner (Germany) Dennis Marschall (Italy) Lorenzo Patrese	Ferrari 296 GT3	167	+3 Laps
22	B	21	(China) Harmony Racing	(United States) Dustin Blattner (Germany) Dennis Marschall (Italy) Lorenzo Patrese	Ferrari F163 3.0 L Turbo V6	167	+3 Laps
23	S	33	(South Korea) Vollgas Motorsport	(Netherlands) "Daan Arrow" (China) Liang Jiatong (South Korea) Jongpil Kim	Porsche 911 GT3 R (992)	167	+3 Laps
23	S	33	(South Korea) Vollgas Motorsport	(Netherlands) "Daan Arrow" (China) Liang Jiatong (South Korea) Jongpil Kim	Porsche M97/80 4.2 L Flat-6	167	+3 Laps
24	B	13	(China) Phantom Global Racing	(Hong Kong) Adderly Fong (China) "JZ" (Germany) Nico Menzel	Porsche 911 GT3 R (992)	167	+3 Laps
24	B	13	(China) Phantom Global Racing	(Hong Kong) Adderly Fong (China) "JZ" (Germany) Nico Menzel	Porsche M97/80 4.2 L Flat-6	167	+3 Laps
25	Am	**360**	**(Japan) RunUp Sports**	**(Japan) Masaaki Nishikawa (Japan) Yusaku Shibata (Japan) Atsushi Tanaka**	**Nissan GT-R Nismo GT3**	**160**	**+10 Laps‡**
25	Am	**360**	**(Japan) RunUp Sports**	**(Japan) Masaaki Nishikawa (Japan) Yusaku Shibata (Japan) Atsushi Tanaka**	Nissan VR38DETT 3.8 L Twin Turbo V6	**160**	**+10 Laps‡**
26	PA	60	(Japan) LM corsa	(Italy) Giancarlo Fisichella (Japan) Kei Nakanishi (Japan) Shigekazu Wakisaka	Ferrari 296 GT3	158	+12 Laps
26	PA	60	(Japan) LM corsa	(Italy) Giancarlo Fisichella (Japan) Kei Nakanishi (Japan) Shigekazu Wakisaka	Ferrari F163 3.0 L Turbo V6	158	+12 Laps
27	Am	51	(Australia) AMAC Motorsport	(Australia) Grant Denyer (Australia) Andrew Macpherson (Australia) William Ben Porter	Porsche 911 GT3 R (991.2)	144	+26 Laps
27	Am	51	(Australia) AMAC Motorsport	(Australia) Grant Denyer (Australia) Andrew Macpherson (Australia) William Ben Porter	Porsche M97/76 4.0 L Flat-6	144	+26 Laps
28	B	98	(Japan) K-tunes Racing	(Japan) Shinichi Takagi (United Kingdom) Sean Walkinshaw (Japan) Daisuke Yamawaki	Ferrari 296 GT3	123	+47 Laps
28	B	98	(Japan) K-tunes Racing	(Japan) Shinichi Takagi (United Kingdom) Sean Walkinshaw (Japan) Daisuke Yamawaki	Ferrari F163 3.0 L Turbo V6	123	+47 Laps
29	B	555	(Japan) Maezawa Racing	(Japan) Yusaku Maezawa (France) Thomas Neubauer (Japan) Naoki Yokomizo	Ferrari 296 GT3	119	+51 Laps
29	B	555	(Japan) Maezawa Racing	(Japan) Yusaku Maezawa (France) Thomas Neubauer (Japan) Naoki Yokomizo	Ferrari F163 3.0 L Turbo V6	119	+51 Laps
NC	S	14	(Hong Kong) Audi Sport Asia Team Phantom	(China) Cheng Congfu (China) Deng Yi (China) Yu Kuai	Audi R8 LMS Evo II	113	+57 Laps
NC	S	14	(Hong Kong) Audi Sport Asia Team Phantom	(China) Cheng Congfu (China) Deng Yi (China) Yu Kuai	Audi DAR 5.2 L V10	113	+57 Laps
NC	P	30	(Japan) Team HandWork Challenge	(Japan) Iori Kimura (Japan) Atsushi Miyake (Japan) Daiki Sasaki	Nissan GT-R Nismo GT3	111	+59 Laps; Collision
NC	P	30	(Japan) Team HandWork Challenge	(Japan) Iori Kimura (Japan) Atsushi Miyake (Japan) Daiki Sasaki	Nissan VR38DETT 3.8 L Twin Turbo V6	111	+59 Laps; Collision
NC	PA	45	(Japan) Ponos Racing	(Japan) Kei Cozzolino (Japan) Yorikatsu Tsujiko (Japan) Yusuke Yamasaki	Ferrari 296 GT3	104	+66 Laps; Suspension
NC	PA	45	(Japan) Ponos Racing	(Japan) Kei Cozzolino (Japan) Yorikatsu Tsujiko (Japan) Yusuke Yamasaki	Ferrari F163 3.0 L Turbo V6	104	+66 Laps; Suspension
NC	B	9	(Japan) Bingo Racing	(Japan) Reimei Ito (Japan) Ukyo Sasahara (Japan) Shinji Takei	Callaway Corvette C7 GT3-R	87	+83 Laps; Brakes
NC	B	9	(Japan) Bingo Racing	(Japan) Reimei Ito (Japan) Ukyo Sasahara (Japan) Shinji Takei	Chevrolet LT1 6.2 L V8	87	+83 Laps; Brakes

Icon	Class
**P**	Pro Cup
**S**	Silver Cup
**B**	Bronze Cup
**PA**	Pro-Am Cup
**Am**	Am Cup

== Notes ==
Intercontinental GT Challenge
Previous race: 2025 24 Hours of Spa	2025 season	Next race: 2025 Indianapolis 8 Hours
