= DSE-Alpha =

Proposed 2005 mission to take the first space tourists to fly around the Moon

Deep Space Expedition Alpha (DSE-Alpha), is the name given to the mission proposed in 2005 to take the first space tourists to fly around the Moon. The mission is organized by Space Adventures Ltd., a commercial spaceflight company. The plans involve a modified Soyuz capsule docking with a booster rocket in Earth orbit which then sends the spacecraft on a free return circumlunar trajectory that circles around the Moon once. While the price was originally announced in August 2005 to cost US$100 million per seat, Space Adventures founder Eric Anderson announced in January 2011 that one of the two available seats had been sold for $150 million.

== Concept ==
Use of the Soyuz spacecraft was considered as the original Soyuz design of 1962 was specifically intended for circumlunar travel. In the late 1960s a stripped down Soyuz variant, under the name Zond, made several attempts at circumlunar flight, with eventual success.

The DSE proposal is to launch the Soyuz with one crew member and two passengers aboard; a Zenit rocket booster will then be launched carrying a rocket stage weighing up to 14.5t, to dock with the Soyuz and propel it to circumlunar velocity. Two different flight profiles were originally proposed by Space Adventures. The direct-staged profile, lasting about 8–9 days, would involve docking to the booster stage intended to propel the craft and direct departure for the Moon. A proposed timeline for such a flight plan is as follows:

- Day 1: Launch of Soyuz spacecraft into low Earth orbit
- Day 2: Launch of Block DM upper stage on rocket booster
- Day 3: Rendezvous and docking of Soyuz with booster, trans-lunar injection burn after checkout of systems
- Days 4-5: Coast to the Moon on circumlunar trajectory
- Day 6: Closest approach as the Soyuz loops around the far side of the Moon
- Days 7-8: Coast back to Earth
- Day 9: Atmospheric reentry and landing

The other profile, lasting about 9–21 days, would incorporate a several day visit to the International Space Station into the flight plan before rendezvousing with the booster stage and departing for the Moon.

The Soyuz spacecraft used for the mission would be modified from the orbital Soyuz, with a thicker and more durable heat shield and a Yamal satellite communications system. The Block DM booster would use an automatic docking system for the rendezvous with the Soyuz in low Earth orbit.

On June 28, 2007 Space.com reported that two individuals had displayed interest in purchasing seats with contract negotiations expected to be concluded by the end of the year. In January 2011, Space Adventures founder Eric Anderson announced that one of the two seats on the flight had been sold at a price of US$150 million, and negotiations for the second seat were under way.

In 2011, Space Adventures projected the first mission could occur by 2015. By 2014 this had slipped to 2018, and the company's website subsequently changed to indicate they expected their first mission to launch before the end of the decade then changed again to remove any suggested timeline.

== Criticism ==
Mark Wade, author of the Encyclopedia Astronautica, has argued that the Zenit rocket is not powerful enough for this mission and that the larger Proton rocket will in fact be needed. These same calculations have also shown that a fully fueled and outfitted Block DM would be beyond the capabilities of the Zenit rocket, and the DM would have to fire for a short time in order to stabilize its orbit.

== See also ==
- Space tourism
- Space Adventures
- List of current and future lunar missions
