= Insa Thiele-Eich =

German Meteorologist and Astronaut Candidate

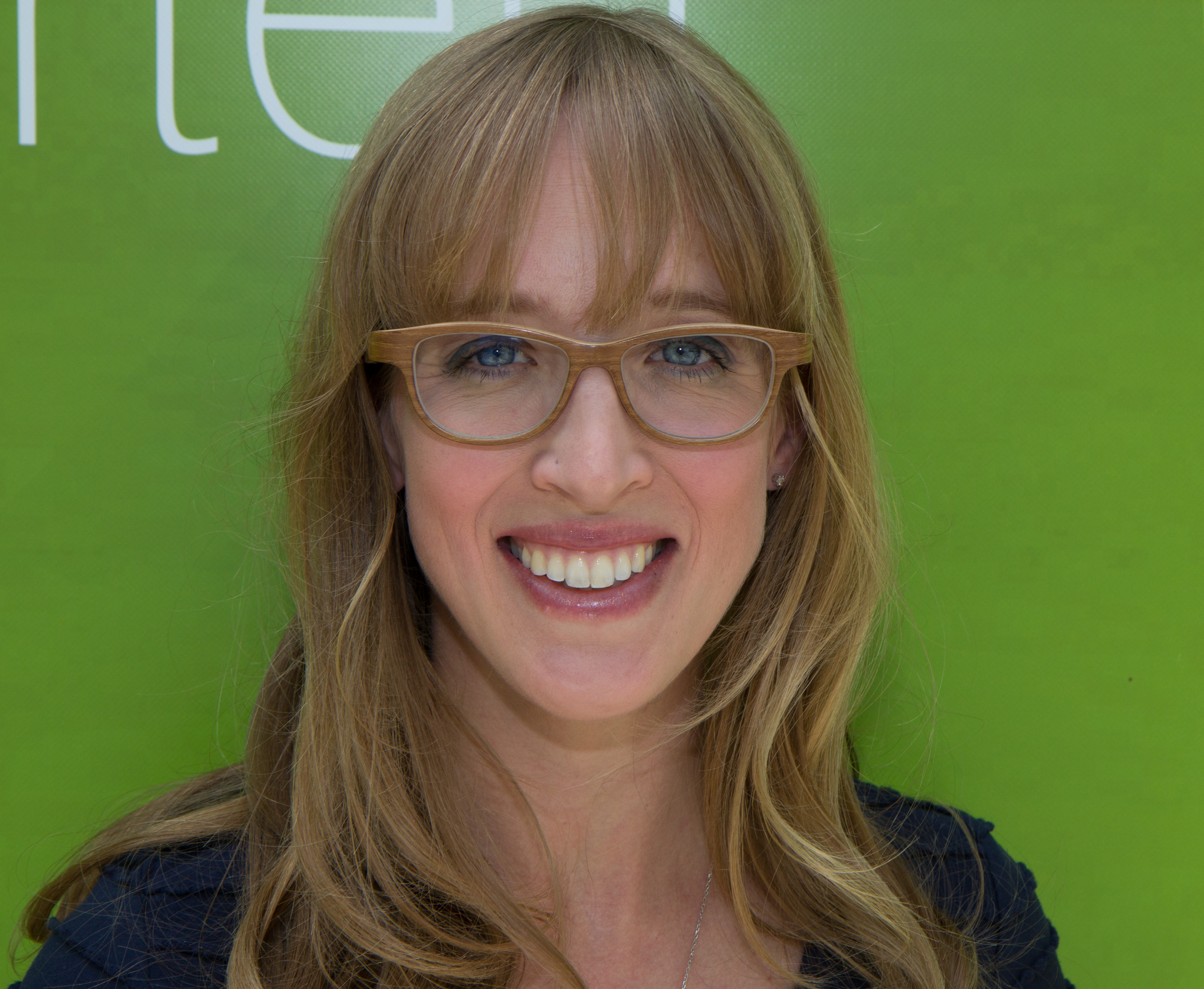
- Thiele-Eich in 2018
- Born: Thiele; 21 April 1983 (age 43); Heidelberg
- Occupations: Meteorologist, Astronaut Candidate
- Space career

Die Astronautin Astronaut
- Selection: 2016 Die Astronautin Selection

Insa Thiele-Eich (born April 21, 1983) is a German meteorologist and astronaut candidate, selected by the German non-government Die Astronautin project in April 2017. She was one of two women selected to be the first German woman in space, the end goal of the Die Astronautin initiative. In 2024, it was reported that the project had failed.

== Early life and education ==
Thiele-Eich was born on 21 April 1983 in Heidelberg, Baden-Württemberg, Germany. Her father is European Space Agency astronaut Gerhard Thiele, who flew as mission specialist aboard Space Shuttle Endeavour's STS-99 mission in 2000. Later in her life she went on to study meteorology at the University of Bonn in North Rhine-Westphalia, Germany. She later earned her PhD with a thesis on the effects of climate change on Bangladesh.

== Career ==
Following her PhD, she returned to her alma mater, the University of Bonn, to work as scientific coordinator at the university meteorological institute. She conducted research in weather and climate prediction models and into the meteorological exchange process, her research interests include the impact of climate and weather on human health, the impacts of climate change on specific countries and global hydrometeorology and extreme value analysis.

== Die Astronautin ==
In March 2016 the German non-government initiative, Die Astronautin was founded with the goal of sending the first German woman into space. They put out a call for German woman to apply and received over 400 applications, including Thiele-Eich. By March 2017 Thiele-Eich was included in the group of six finalists for the project. Within a month Die Astronautin officially announced that Thiele-Eich was one of the two women selected, alongside fighter pilot Nicola Baumann (who later pulled out of the program and was replaced by Suzanna Randall, another one of the original six finalists), the two began training in Star City, Russia in August 2017.

She took time off from training for the project in 2018 for maternity leave and returned to training in early 2019. In 2024, it was reported that the project had failed. However, unrelated to this initiative, on the Fram2 mission in 2025, Rabea Rogge became the first female German astronaut.
