= Suzanna Randall =

German astrophysicist (b. 1979)

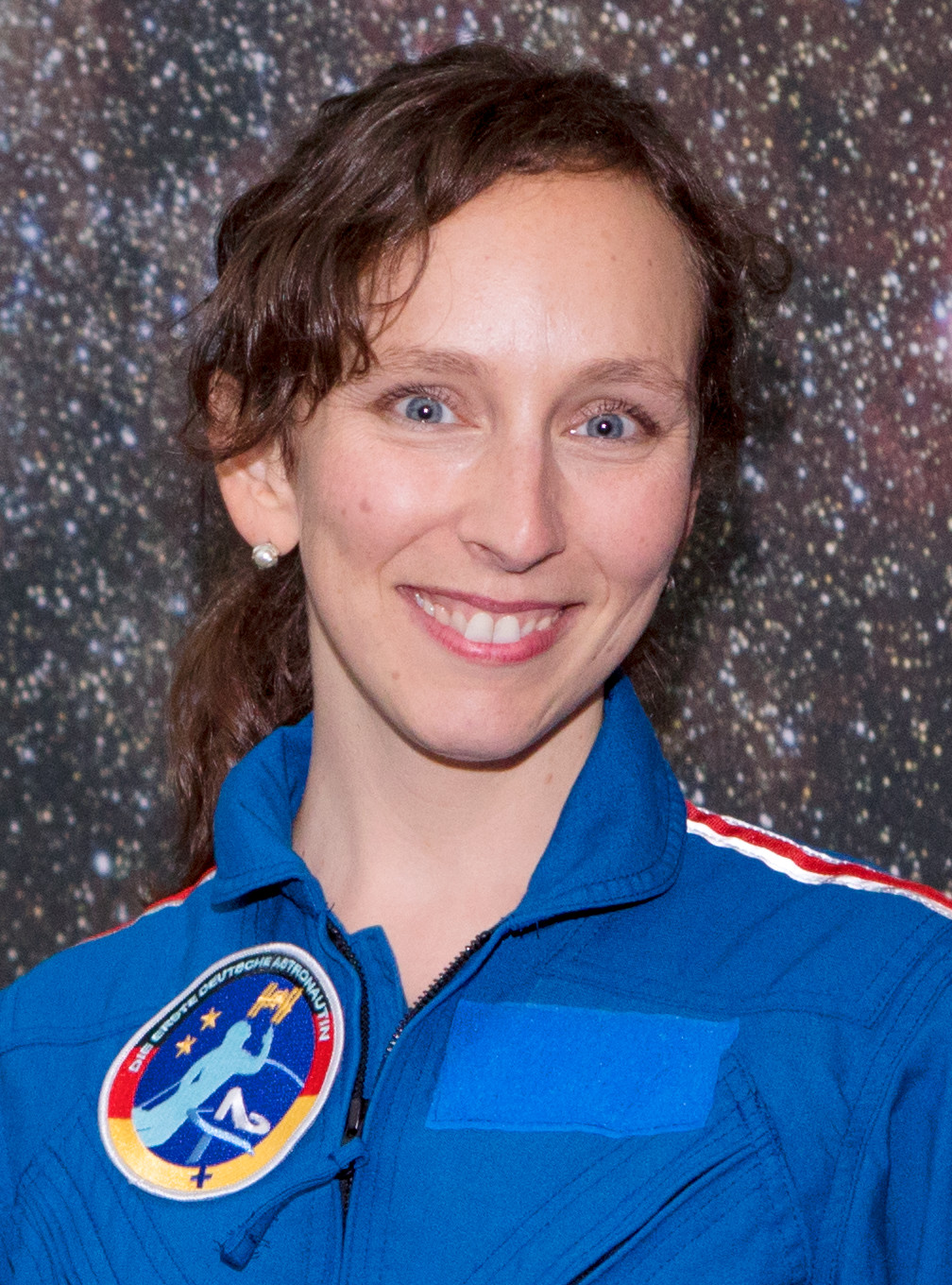
- Born: 6 December 1979 (age 46); Cologne, West Germany
- Education: University College London; Université de Montréal
- Scientific career
- Workplaces: European Southern Observatory
- Thesis: Asteroseismological Studies of Long- and Short-Period Variable Subdwarf B Stars (2006)
- Doctoral advisor: Gilles Fontaine

Suzanna Randall (born 6 December 1979) is a German astrophysicist working at the European Southern Observatory. In 2018, Randall was selected as an astronaut candidate by the private spaceflight organisation Die Astronautin ("The Female Astronaut"), which aims to send the first German woman into space.

== Education and career ==
Suzanna Randall was born in Cologne, Germany on 6 December 1979 to a British father and German mother. Randall recalls initially not being interested in studying science in school. Her role model was the astronaut Sally Ride, the first American woman in space, and the desire to become an astronaut led Randall to switch from studying English and German to physics and math. After she graduated from the Dietrich-Bonhoeffer-Gymnasium in Bergisch Gladbach in 1998, she received a master's degree in astronomy at University College London in 2002 and completed a PhD in astrophysics at the Université de Montréal, advised by Gilles Fontaine, in 2006. Her dissertation was titled Asteroseismological Studies of Long- and Short-Period Variable Subdwarf B Stars.

Starting in 2006 Randall was a fellow at the European Southern Observatory (ESO) in Garching for three years. She then held an unpaid research associate position working on ESO's Very Large Telescope (VLT) for one year. Since then, she has worked various duties at the institution related to the Atacama Large Millimeter Array (ALMA) and conducted research on pulsating blue subdwarf stars.

== Private astronaut candidate ==
Randall applied to the 2008/2009 astronaut selection of the European Space Agency (ESA), but failed the initial psychological tests. In 2016, she was one of 400 applicants to the spaceflight programme Die Astronautin, a privately funded initiative to send the first female German astronaut to space. Die Astronautin initially planned to send an astronaut to stay around ten days on the International Space Station by 2019, at the latest, but this was later postponed to 2023. Nicola Baumann and Insa Thiele-Eich were selected as the final candidates in April 2017, although Randall, one of the six finalists, replaced Baumann in February 2018 after Baumann withdrew from the programme. After their selection, Randall and Thiele-Eich have undergone astronaut training and engaged in public relations benefitting the programme's sponsors. One of the candidates will be selected to fly the mission after the programme has raised sufficient funds from sponsors. Randall has taken part in the training part time, alongside her research at ESO, which has included flight training for a private pilot licence.

In November 2018 Randall appeared on the quiz show Ich weiß alles! (English: I know everything!). Since September 2020 she has appeared in videos for the YouTube channel "Terra X Lesch & Co", produced by public broadcaster ZDF, where she explains scientific topics and alternates as presenter with physicist Harald Lesch. In 2021 Randall and Thiele-Eich wrote two children's books under publisher Oetinger-Verlag—Unser Weg ins Weltall and the sequel Abenteuer Raketenstart—intended to inspire interest in science and astronauts, especially in girls.
