= Gerhard Thiele =

German physicist and astronaut (born 1953)

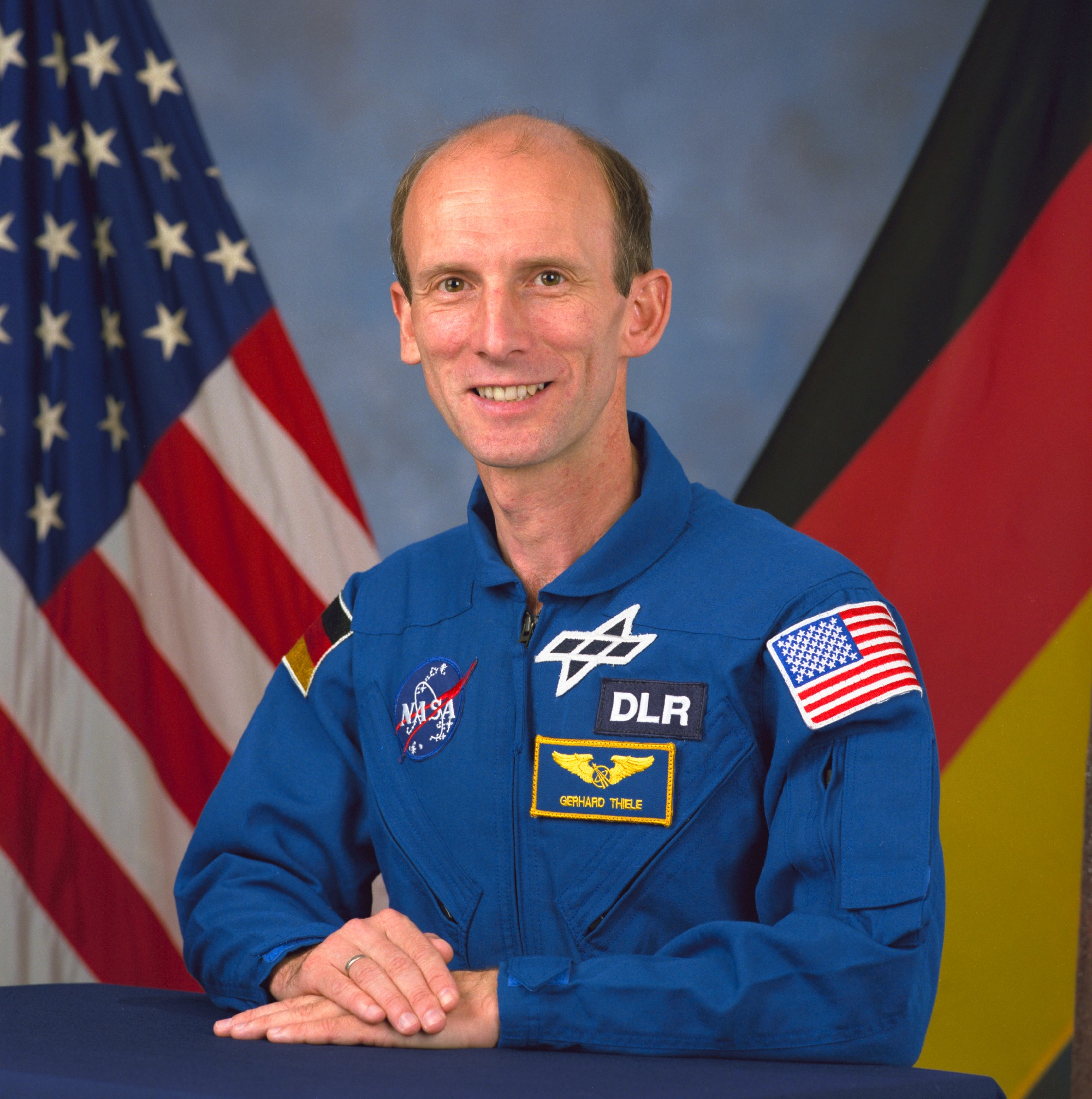
- Official NASA portrait
- Born: Gerhard Paul Julius Thiele; September 2, 1953 (age 73); Heidenheim, West Germany
- Occupation: Physicist
- Space career

DFVLR/ESA astronaut
- Time in space: 11d 05h 39m
- Selection: 1987 German Group, NASA Group 16 (1996)
- Missions: STS-99
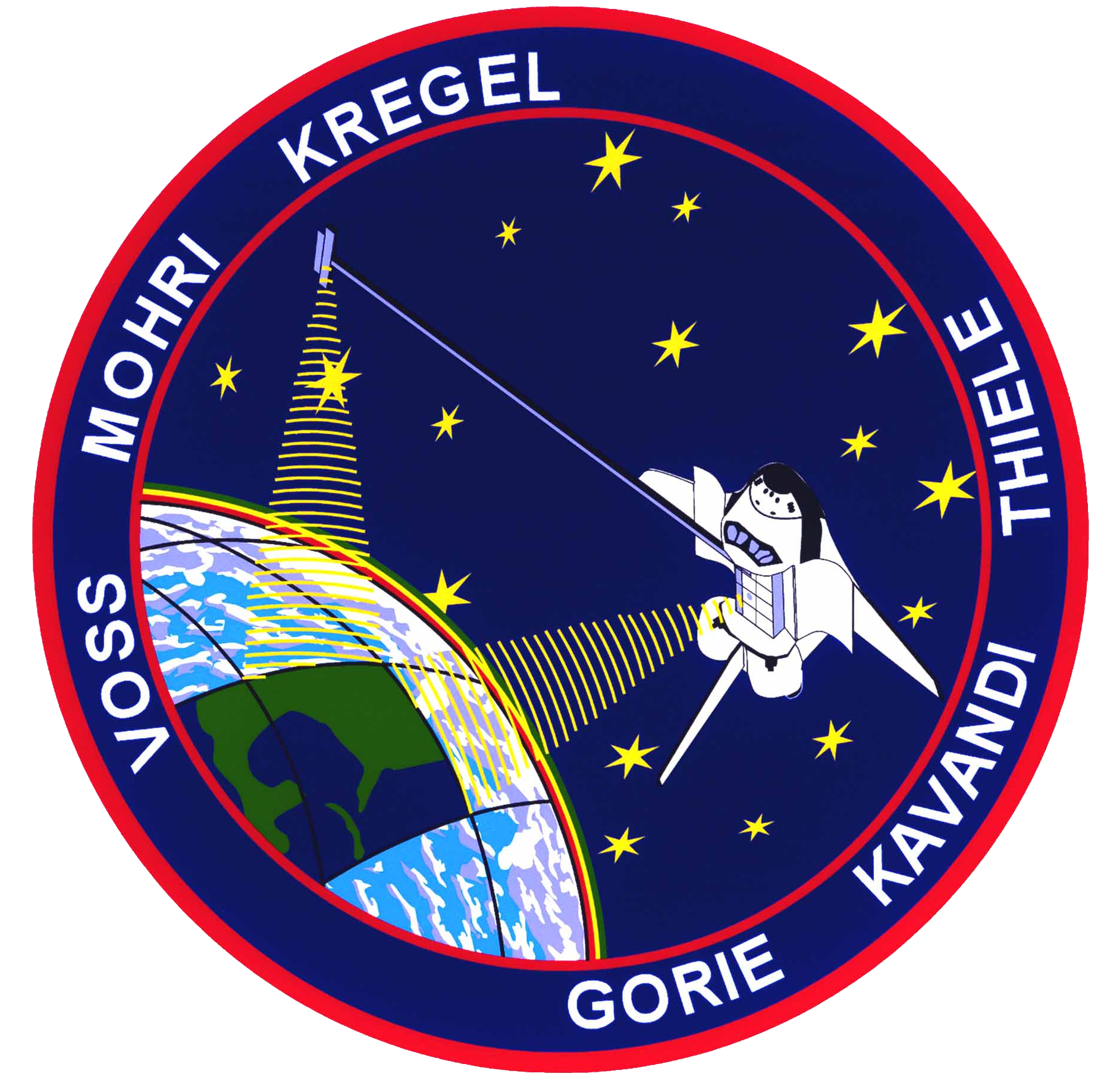
- Mission insignia
- Scientific career
- Fields: Environmental science
- Thesis: Ein kinematisches Boxmodell zur Auswertung der Verteilung anthropogener Spurenstoffe in der Warmwassersphäre des Nordostatlantik (1985)

Gerhard Paul Julius Thiele (born 2 September 1953) is a German physicist and a former ESA astronaut. He is the father of Die Astronautin candidate Insa Thiele-Eich.

== Early life and education ==
Born in Heidenheim an der Brenz, he attended the Friedrich-Schiller-Gymnasium in Ludwigsburg. After school, he volunteered for the German Navy, serving as Operations/Weapons Officer aboard fast patrol boats. In 1976, he began to study physics at LMU Munich and Heidelberg University. He received his doctorate at Heidelberg University in 1985 in environmental science.

== Career ==
From 1986 to 1987, he was a postdoc at Princeton University. In 1988, he was selected for the German astronaut team and began basic training at the DLR. In 1990, he was selected as a backup crew member for the German spacelab mission D-2 (STS-55). During the mission, which took part in April 1993, he worked in the Payload Operations Control Center of DLR at Oberpfaffenhofen as the alternate payload specialist.

In 1996, he was selected by the German Space Agency to receive Space Shuttle Mission Specialist training at NASA. In August 1998, he joined the European Space Agency (ESA), into which the German national team was integrated. In 2000, he completed his only spaceflight, the STS-99 Shuttle Radar Topography Mission.

During 2003 and 2004, he trained in Russia as the backup for André Kuipers on the Soyuz TMA-4 mission.

He retired from the European Astronaut Corps in October 2005.

As from 1 April 2010, he became Resident Fellow with the European Space Policy Institute in Vienna, Austria.

Gerhard Thiele has been appointed as the head of ESA's Human Spaceflight and Operations Strategic Planning and Outreach office (HSO-K) effective 1 July 2013.
