= Soyuz MS-20 =

2021 Russian crewed spaceflight to the ISS

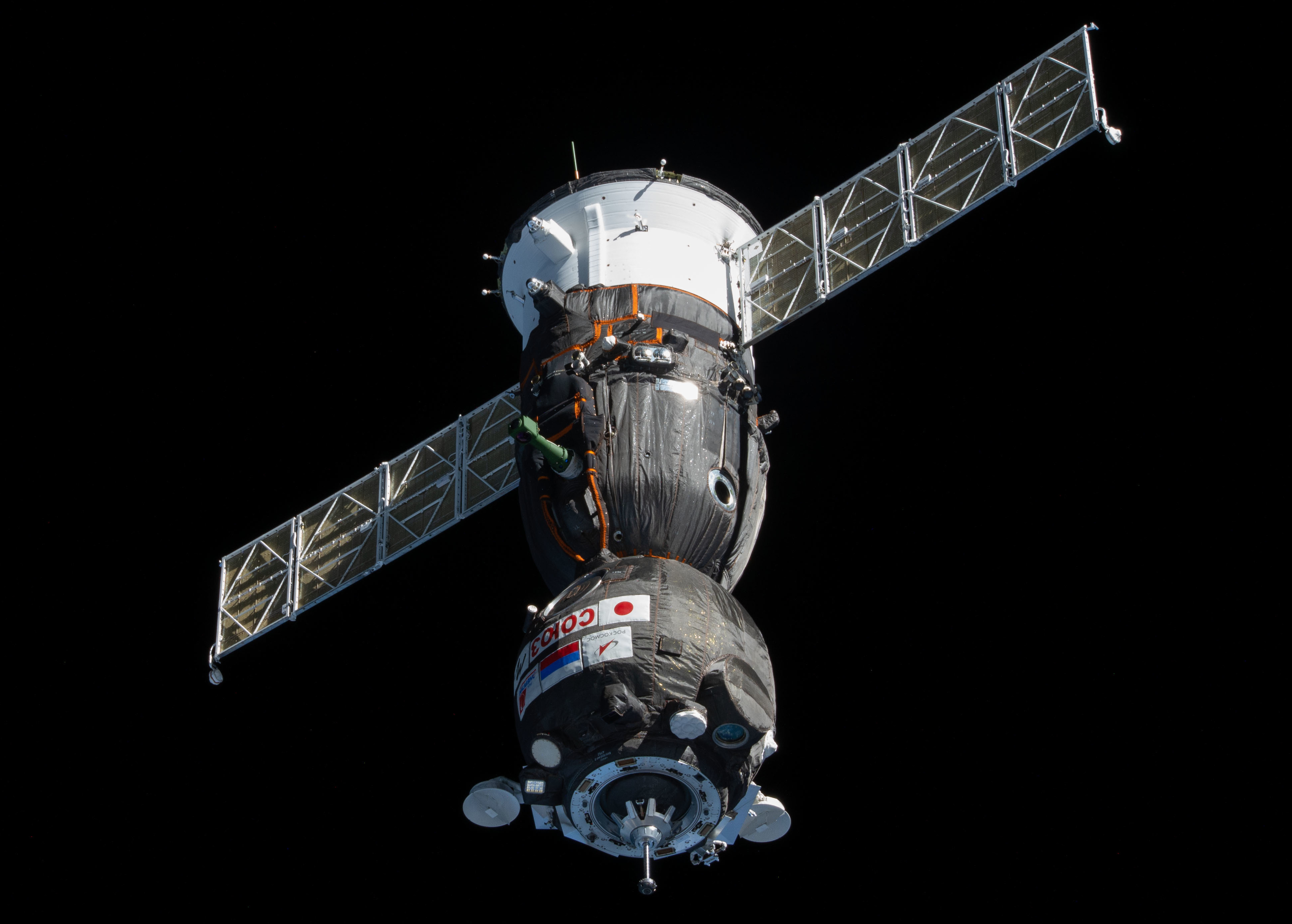
- Docking of Soyuz MS-20
- Names: ISS 66S
- Mission type: Space tourism
- Operator: Roscosmos
- COSPAR ID: 2021-119A
- SATCAT no.: 49922
- Mission duration: 11 days, 19 hours and 34 minutes

Spacecraft properties
- Spacecraft: Soyuz MS No. 752
- Spacecraft type: Soyuz MS
- Manufacturer: RSC Energia

Crew
- Crew size: 3
- Members: Alexander Misurkin; Yusaku Maezawa; Yozo Hirano
- Callsign: Altair

Start of mission
- Launch date: 8 December 2021, 07:38:15 UTC
- Rocket: Soyuz-2.1a
- Launch site: Baikonur, Site 31/6
- Contractor: RKTs Progress

End of mission
- Landing date: 20 December 2021, 03:12:52 UTC
- Landing site: Kazakh Steppe, Kazakhstan (47°21′N 69°37′E)

Orbital parameters
- Reference system: Geocentric orbit
- Regime: Low Earth orbit
- Inclination: 51.66°

Docking with ISS
- Docking port: Poisk zenith
- Docking date: 8 December 2021, 16:40:44 UTC
- Undocking date: 19 December 2021, 23:50:30 UTC
- Time docked: 11 days, 10 hours and 9 minutes
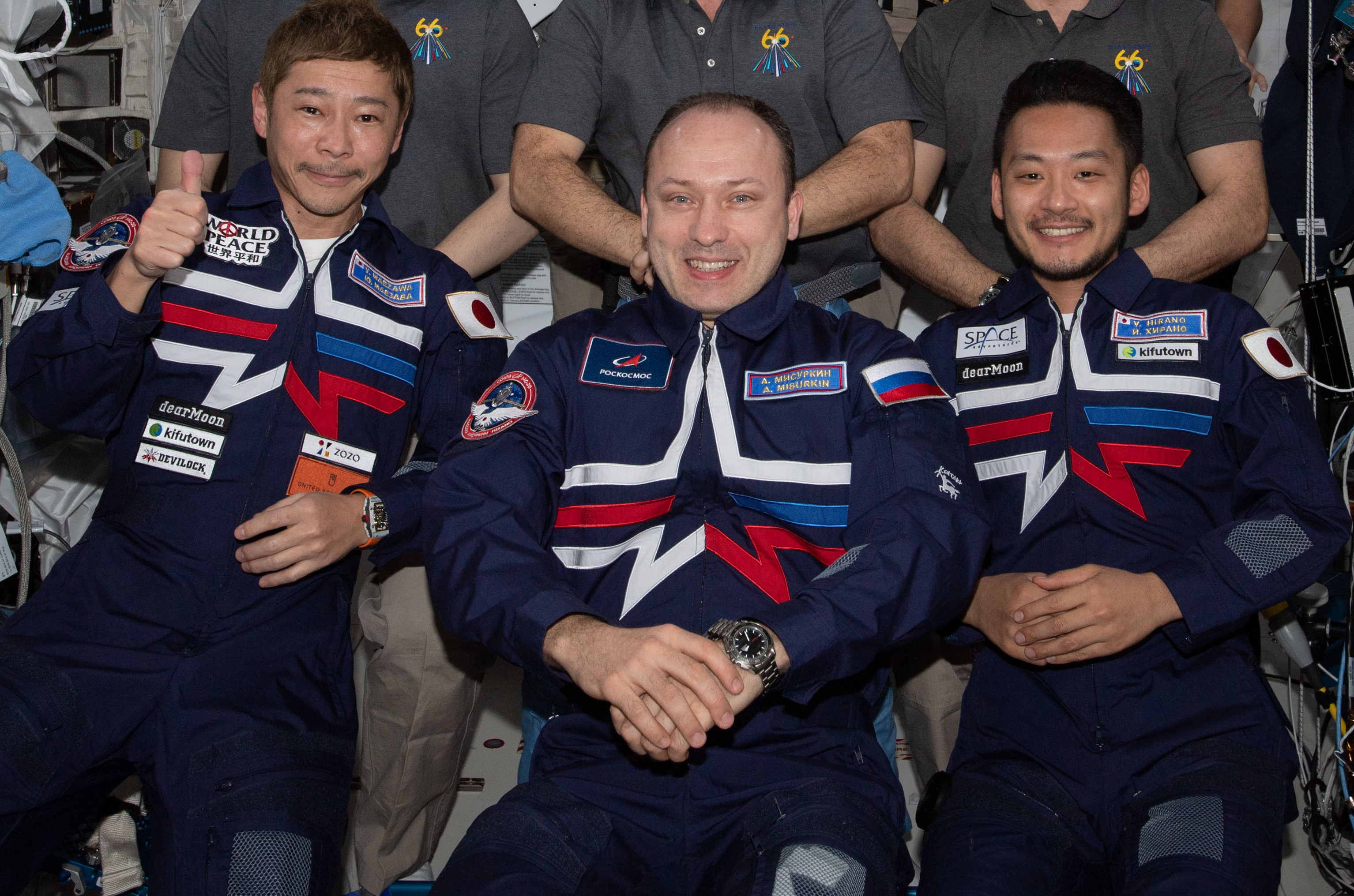
- Soyuz MS-20 mission patch From left: Maezawa, Misurkin and Hirano Soyuz programme

Soyuz MS-20 was a Russian Soyuz spaceflight to the International Space Station (ISS) on 8–20 December 2021. Unlike previous Soyuz flights to the ISS, Soyuz MS-20 did not deliver any crew members for an ISS Expedition or serve as a lifeboat for any crew members on board the station. Instead, it was commanded by a single professional cosmonaut. It carried two space tourists represented by company Space Adventures, which had executed eight space tourism missions to the ISS between 2001 and 2009. The flight to reach the ISS took six hours.

== Crew ==
Alexander Misurkin, a veteran of two long-duration missions to the ISS, commanded the Soyuz, which was modified to allow it to be flown by a sole cosmonaut.

Position	Crew member
Commander	Alexander Misurkin, Roscosmos; Visiting; Third and last spaceflight
Spaceflight Participant 1	(Japan) Yusaku Maezawa, Space Adventures; Visiting; First spaceflight
Spaceflight Participant 2	(Japan) Yozo Hirano, Space Adventures; Visiting; First spaceflight

=== Backup crew ===
Position	Crew member
Commander	Alexander Skvortsov, Roscosmos
Spaceflight Participant 1	None‡
Spaceflight Participant 2	(Japan) Shun Ogiso, Space Adventures
‡ Cosmonaut Andrey Fedyaev played the role of Spaceflight Participant 1 during training

=== Space tourists ===
For some time, it was speculated that Austrian airline pilot Johanna Maislinger would be one of the tourists, but on 13 May 2021, Space Adventures confirmed that Japanese billionaire, art collector and space enthusiast Yusaku Maezawa had acquired both seats, the other for his production assistant Yozo Hirano. This was the first time two Japanese launched to space together.

In July 2021, Space Adventures Moscow Office changed their previous story and said that Maislinger had never had access to the funds she had claimed, and they had never treated her as a serious candidate.

It was also reported in April 2021 that Japanese entertainer Yumi Matsutoya was to fly on Soyuz MS-20 with Maislinger.

== Notes ==
Soyuz MS-20 marks the first tourist flight to the ISS after more than 12 years since Canadian Guy Laliberté onboard Soyuz TMA-16 in September 2009. British singer Sarah Brightman was to fly Soyuz TMA-18M in September 2015, but she cancelled in May 2015.

Soyuz MS-20 was also reported in April 2020 as the first of at least two completely commercial Soyuz flights by Roscosmos, to be followed by Soyuz MS-23 in October 2022 carrying one cosmonaut and two passengers, possibly from United Arab Emirates, to the ISS for six months. However, this was changed to a standard Russian-American Expedition 68 launch even during 2021; and after the events of 2022 culminated in December with a micrometeorite puncturing the Soyuz MS-22 cooling system, Soyuz MS-23 was launched on 24 February 2023 empty to replace it.

Soyuz MS-20 also marks a departure from the way space tourism was done in the 2000s. Previous missions took one tourist during either a taxi flight, where Soyuz lifeboats on the ISS were swapped, allowing for about a week-long stay or handover periods between crews, where the tourist would launch with an incoming long-duration crew and land with the outgoing one. Soyuz MS-20 switched to a flight entirely dedicated to two space tourists. Soon afterward, American company Axiom Space carried out a similar flight with SpaceX, where an Axiom-hired professional astronaut flew with three paying tourists to the ISS on board Crew Dragon Endeavour, on 8–25 April 2022.
