= Yozo Hirano =

Japanese space tourist (born 1985)

- 平野 陽三
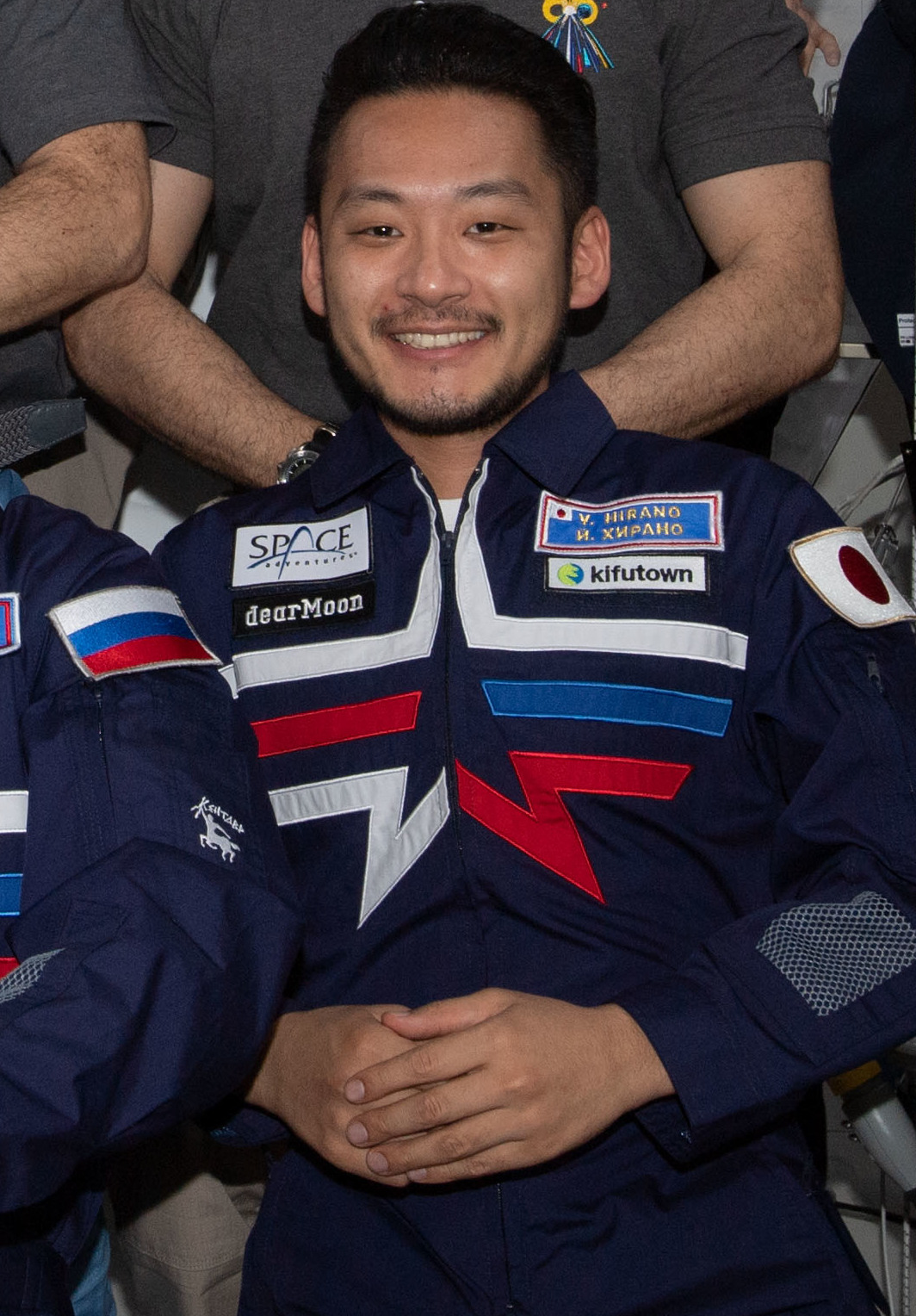
- Hirano in 2021
- Born: October 9, 1985 (age 40); Imabari, Ehime Prefecture, Japan
- Occupation: Film producer
- Organization(s): Start Today, Zozotown, ZOZO
- Space career

Space Adventures space tourist
- Time in space: 11 days, 19 hours, 34 minutes
- Missions: Soyuz MS-20

Yozo Hirano (平野 陽三, Hirano Yōzō; born October 9, 1985) is a Japanese space tourist. He flew to the International Space Station on Soyuz MS-20 in December 2021.

He flew with Yusaku Maezawa, who paid for both seats; his function was that as a production assistant to Maezawa and to document the flight.

== Education and professional activities ==
Yozo Hirano joined ZOZO, Ltd. after graduating from Kyoto Prefectural University with a degree in casting director of a photography group. There he became the casting director and the manager of the photography team. There he is now working at Start today division of ZOZO, run by Maezawa, as a film producer. He works for Maezawa's private projects, including filming for Maezawa's YouTube channel. Thus being with Maezawa all the time he was selected for a mission to the ISS, where Yozo will be responsible for filming Maezawa during their stay.

== Spaceflight ==
On May 13, 2021, Space Adventures announced that Yozo Hirano had passed the medical examination and from June 2021, together with Yusaku Maezawa, he began preparations for a space tourism trip on the Soyuz MS-20 flight, which launched on December 8, 2021. The duration of the space flight was 12 days. Roscosmos cosmonaut Alexander Misurkin served as the commander. During the flight, Hirano was responsible for documenting the flight of Yusaku Maezawa.

On June 15, 2021, the participants of MS-20 presented to the management and staff of the Center at the Yuri Gagarin Cosmonaut Training Center. Together with Maezawa and Hirano, Shun Ogiso, the Public Relations Manager of the Start Today corporation, also participated in the training, and served as the backup crew member for Hirano.
