= Lunar sortie =

A lunar sortie (or lunar sortie mission) is a human spaceflight mission to the Moon. In contrast with lunar outpost missions, lunar sorties will be of relatively brief duration.

== NASA sorties ==
On 4 December 2006, NASA announced a "Global Exploration Strategy" and lunar architecture that would implement the Vision for Space Exploration. The planned lunar missions would begin with four-person crews making several seven-day sortie missions to the moon until the power supplies, rovers and living quarters of an outpost are operational.

== Private lunar sorties ==
As of 2010, Space Adventures is a NewSpace company offering advance booking to allow private individuals to take a future lunar mission involving travel to circumnavigate the Moon. Pricing has been announced at US$100 million per seat. This mission will utilize two Russian launch vehicles. One Soyuz capsule will be launched into low Earth orbit by a Soyuz rocket. Once in orbit, the crewed capsule will dock with a second, uncrewed, lunar-propulsion module which will then power the circumlunar portion of the trip. No time frame for the first mission has been announced.
