= Space Adventures =

American space tourism company

Space Adventures, Inc.
- Type: Private
- Industry: Commercial spaceflight
- Founded: 1998
- Headquarters: Vienna, Virginia, United States
- Products: Space tourism
- Website: www.spaceadventures.com

Space Adventures, Inc. is an American space tourism company founded in 1998 by Eric C. Anderson. Its offerings include zero-gravity atmospheric flights, orbital spaceflights (with the option to participate in a spacewalk), and other spaceflight-related experiences including cosmonaut training, spacewalk training, and launch tours. Plans announced thus far include sub-orbital and lunar spaceflights, though these are not being actively pursued at present. Nine of its clients have participated in the orbital spaceflight program with Space Adventures, including one who took two separate trips to space.

== History ==
Space Adventures was founded in 1998 by Eric C. Anderson — president and CEO — with several other entrepreneurs from the aerospace, adventure travel and entertainment industries. The company is headquartered in Tysons Corner, Virginia, with an office in Moscow.

Space Adventures offers a variety of programs, such as orbital spaceflight missions to the International Space Station (ISS), circumlunar missions around the Moon, zero gravity flights, cosmonaut training programs, spaceflight qualification programs, and reservations on future suborbital spacecraft.

Since 2001, Space Adventures has launched seven clients on eight successful missions to the ISS. In April 2001, the company sent American businessman Dennis Tito for a reported US$20 million payment, making him the first space tourist. South African businessman Mark Shuttleworth did the same in April 2002, becoming the first African in space. Gregory Olsen became the third private citizen to travel to the ISS in October 2005, followed by the first female space tourist, Anousheh Ansari, who completed her 10-day orbital mission in September 2006. Charles Simonyi, an ex-executive at Microsoft, became the fifth space tourist who visited the ISS in April 2007, then again in March 2009. He is the world's first private space explorer who launched to space twice. In 2008, game developer Richard Garriott, the first second-generation U.S. astronaut, became the sixth client to travel to the ISS. In October 2009, Cirque du Soleil founder Guy Laliberté became the first Canadian space tourist to have launched into space.

As of 2007, the company's advisory board included Apollo 11 moonwalker Buzz Aldrin, Space Shuttle astronauts Sam Durrance, Tom Jones, Byron Lichtenberg, Norm Thagard, Kathy Thornton, Pierre Thuot, and Charles Walker, Skylab/Shuttle astronaut Owen Garriott, and Russian cosmonaut Yuri Usachev.

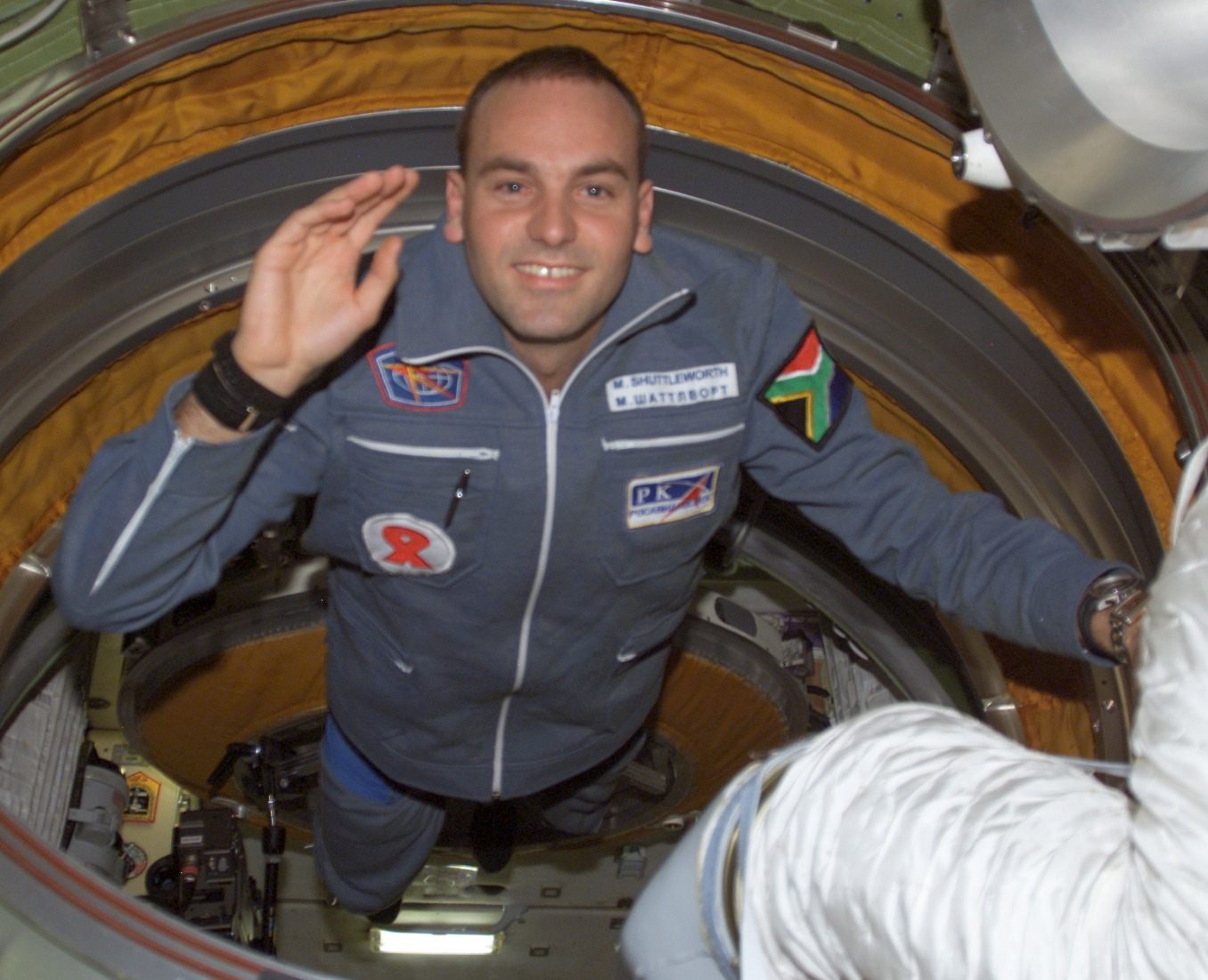
Mark Shuttleworth in space

In January 2008, Space Adventures acquired Zero Gravity Corporation, which is the first and only FAA-approved provider of weightless flights to the general public.

In 2015, English soprano Sarah Brightman had been expected to become the eighth client of Space Adventures to visit the ISS, paying US$52 million for her flight, but the company announced that Brightman had postponed her trip "for personal family reasons". Brightman was initially expected to be replaced by another Space Adventures client, Japanese advertisement entrepreneur Satoshi Takamatsu; however, in June 2015, the company announced that Takamatsu had elected to postpone his flight to prepare for "art projects that [he] would like to perform in space [that] require cutting-edge technology both in hardware and software". The spot was eventually taken by Kazakh government cosmonaut Aidyn Aimbetov.

Due to the retirement of the Space Shuttle, from 2011 to 2020, NASA contracted with the Russian space agency Roscosmos to purchase a large number, the majority, of seats on the Soyuz. Space tourism transport to the ISS became possible once again after NASA signed contracts with two commercial carriers in 2020, and by mid-2020, Space Adventures had contracted for two of the available Soyuz seats in 2021.

== Orbital commercial space business ==
=== Clients who have flown in space ===
==== Dennis Tito ====
Space Adventures' first orbital spaceflight client, and the world's first private space explorer, launched to the ISS in April 2001 on Soyuz TM-32. American businessman Dennis Tito received training at the Yuri Gagarin Cosmonaut Training Center in Star City in Russia. Tito participated in Space Adventures' other programs, including a zero-gravity flight, centrifuge training, and a supersonic jet flight before his orbital flight.

==== Mark Shuttleworth ====
Mark Shuttleworth spent 10 days in space. The first African in space, he launched with two crewmates, Russian commander Yuri Gidzenko and Italian astronaut Roberto Vittori. They launched on Soyuz TM-34 from the Baikonur Cosmodrome, Kazakhstan, on 25 April 2002. Before his flight, Shuttleworth completed Space Adventures' Orbital Pre-Qualification Program and underwent almost eight months of training and medical exams, including a one-week orientation program at NASA's Johnson Space Center in Houston, Texas. A zero-gravity flight, centrifuge training, and spacecraft communication, guidance, and control system lessons for the Russian Soyuz spacecraft and ISS were also part of his training. Shuttleworth dedicated his flight to educating South African youth and conducting scientific research.

==== Gregory Olsen ====
Gregory Olsen completed over 900 hours of training in Star City, Russia, in preparation for his mission. He and his crewmates launched from the Baikonur Cosmodrome, Kazakhstan, on 1 October 2005, aboard Soyuz TMA-7. While aboard the ISS, he participated in a research program prepared by the European Space Agency (ESA) that studied the human body's response to the microgravity environment. Through Amateur Radio on the ISS, Dr. Olsen contacted high school students in New Jersey and New York.

==== Anousheh Ansari ====
Anousheh Ansari lifted off on Soyuz TMA-9 on 18 September 2006, from Baikonur, Kazakhstan. Ansari became the fourth (and first female) space tourist. During her eight-day stay onboard the ISS, Ansari conducted four experiments for the European Space Agency, including researching the mechanisms behind anemia, how changes in muscles influence lower back pain, consequences of space radiation on ISS crew members, and different species of microbes that have made a home for themselves on the space station.

==== Charles Simonyi ====
Charles Simonyi is the first repeat orbital spaceflight client of Space Adventures. His first spaceflight mission was in 2007 aboard Soyuz TMA-10, and his second was in 2009 aboard Soyuz TMA-14. Simonyi's goals for both of his missions were to advance civilian spaceflight, assist space station research and involve the world's youth in the science of space travel.

==== Richard Garriott ====
Richard Garriott became the first American, and second second-generation space traveler, following his astronaut father Owen Garriott into space in 2008. He is also the second person to wear the British flag in space. He launched for the ISS on 12 October 2008, aboard Soyuz TMA-13. Richard's main objective for his mission was to encourage commercial participation. By fostering the involvement of individuals, companies, and organizations in his spaceflight, Richard hoped to demonstrate that there is commercial potential in private space exploration while furthering the understanding of space. One of his crewmates on his return journey to Earth aboard Soyuz TMA-12 was Sergey Volkov, the first second-generation space traveler, who followed his father, cosmonaut Aleksandr Volkov into space.

==== Guy Laliberté ====
Guy Laliberté is the first Canadian space tourist, reaching orbit on 30 September 2009, aboard Soyuz TMA-16. While in orbit, Laliberté promoted the One Drop Foundation and proclaimed his mission as a "Poetic Social Mission". He also conducted the first-ever artistic and social event, "Moving Stars and Earth for Water", to originate from space that took place on 9 October 2009. It was a two-hour event that was hosted by Laliberté and many celebrities such as Salma Hayek, Shakira, and Bono, who participated from Earth. He returned to Earth onboard Soyuz TMA-14.

==== Yusaku Maezawa and Yozo Hirano ====
Yusaku Maezawa and his assistant Yozo Hirano flew to space in December 2021, on Soyuz MS-20. While in space, Hirano helped document Maezawa's experiences for his social media. The mission was unusual for a Soyuz flight in that it did not deliver any ISS Expedition crew members or serve as a lifeboat, and was entirely devoted to space tourism. Maezawa, who paid for both his and Hirano's seats, also financed the DearMoon project, in which he and several other people will fly on a circumlunar trajectory onboard SpaceX's Starship later in the decade, though it was later cancelled.

=== Clients who participated in training only ===
- Lance Bass
- Esther Dyson (Investor in Space Adventures)
- Sarah Brightman
- Satoshi Takamatsu

=== Orbital Mission Explorers Circle ===
A program was originally set up to allow individuals to reserve seats on future orbital spaceflights and then retain the option to fly to orbit as their schedule allowed with preferential access to mission seats, or they can opt to sell their seat to another private astronaut. Sergey Brin, co-founder and president of technology for Google Inc., became the founding member of the "Founding Explorer" group by placing a US$5 million deposit on a future orbital spaceflight in 2009. As of 2021, Brin has never exercised his option to fly on one of the available seats.

In 2010, Space Adventures established the Orbital Mission Explorers Circle to build a definitive consortium of future private space explorers who share a lifetime goal of orbital spaceflight or the investment therein. Space Adventures has initially created six "Founding Explorer" positions in the Orbital Mission Explorers Circle, each of whom was intended to have priority access to participate in future orbital space missions.

=== Spacewalk ===
In 2006, the company announced that it would begin offering a spacewalk option to its clients traveling to the ISS. The spacewalk would allow participants to spend up to 1.5 hours outside the space station and costs about US$15 million. It would lengthen the orbital mission by approximately six to eight days. The spacewalk would be completed in the Russian designed Orlan space suit. The training for the spacewalk would also require an extra month of training on top of the six months already required. As of October 2021, no clients have actually contracted for this service.

== Lunar mission ==
Space Adventures is offering advance booking for a future lunar mission involving travel to circumnavigate the Moon, on a circumlunar trajectory. Pricing was announced at US$100 million per seat, as of 2007.

This mission will utilize two Russian launch vehicles. A Soyuz capsule being launched into low Earth orbit by a Soyuz launch vehicle. Once in orbit, the crewed capsule will dock with a second, uncrewed, lunar-propulsion module which will then power the circumlunar portion of the trip. v The mission will last 8–9 days, including (approximately) 2½ days in Earth orbit docking with the propulsion stage, 5 days to reach lunar orbit, a 45-minute observation of the Moon from as low as 100 km (62 mi), and 2½ days to return to Earth. In 2011, Space Adventures announced that they had sold one of the seats on the lunar voyage for US$150 million, and are in negotiations for selling a second seat. They wouldn't reveal the name of the person to whom the ticket was sold but claim he or she is well known. By 2014, they claimed to have found two people willing to spend US$150 million and it could happen within three years. Space Adventures have subsequently amended their website to say they expect the first circumlunar voyage will occur before the end of the decade.

== Low Earth orbit mission ==
In February 2020, the company announced plans to fly private citizens into orbit on Crew Dragon. The SpaceX Crew Dragon vehicle would launch from LC-39A with up to four tourists on board, and spend up to five days in a low Earth orbit with an apogee of over 1,000 kilometres (620 mi). In October 2021, Space Adventures stated that the mission contract had expired, but left open the possibility of a partnership with SpaceX in the future.

== Suborbital initiatives ==
=== Explorer suborbital vehicle ===
The company, along with Prodea and the Federal Space Agency of Russia, began in the mid-2000s to develop a suborbital space transportation system, called Explorer. The vehicle was to be designed by Myasishchev Design Bureau, a Russian aerospace organization which had developed other aircraft and space systems.

By 2006, the Explorer aerospace system would consist of a flight-operational carrier aircraft, the M-55X, and a rocket spacecraft, having the capability to transport up to five people to space. Space Adventures abandoned the Explorer project in 2010 because "it got too expensive".

=== Armadillo suborbital rocket ===
In 2010, Armadillo Aerospace was working on a suborbital commercial launch vehicle that was to have been marketed through Space Adventures. The per-passenger price point was announced in April 2010 to be US$102,000 for a flight to 100 km (62 mi) altitude, above the Karman line.

The Armadillo-developed technology was to have been a vertical takeoff, vertical landing (VTVL) suborbital vehicle carrying space tourists to at least 100 km (62 mi) altitude, with Space Adventures selling the seats. The spacecraft development effort was jointly funded by both Armadillo and Space Adventures.

The project did not advance very far before the assets of Armadillo Aerospace were sold to Exos Aerospace in May 2014.

== Lawsuit ==
Japanese businessman Daisuke Enomoto sued Space Adventures in 2008 as his trip was canceled by the company for medical reasons after he paid US$21 million and no refund was given. The District Court dismissed the majority of the charges on March 3, 2009, on the grounds that Enomoto had signed an agreement, and that he was in fine medical condition to fly.

== See also ==
- Commercial astronaut
- Private spaceflight
