= Yusaku Maezawa =

Japanese entrepreneur (born 1975)

- 前澤 友作
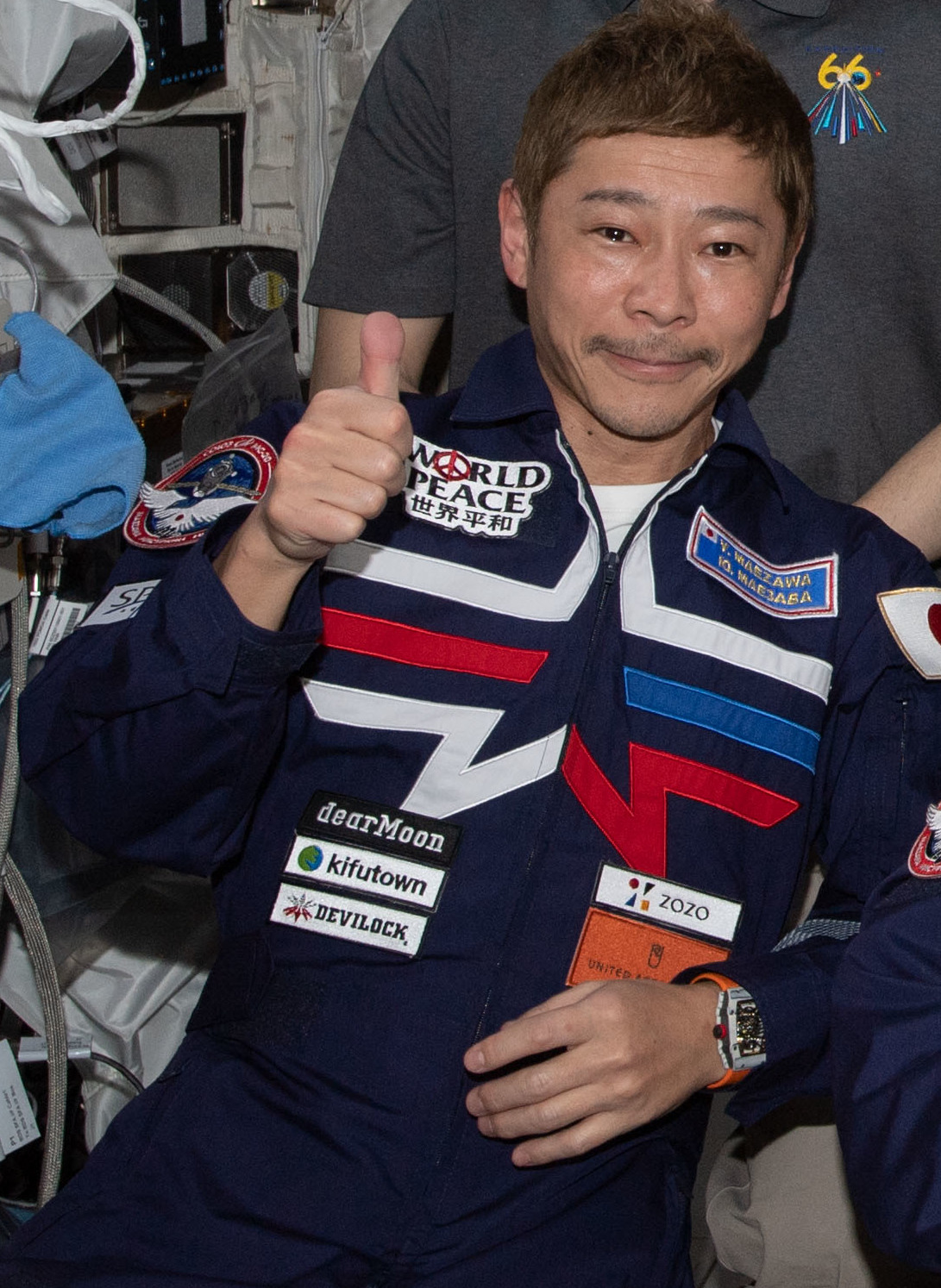
- Maezawa in 2021
- Born: 22 November 1975 (age 50); Kamagaya, Japan
- Occupations: Entrepreneur, art collector
- Years active: 1998–present
- Organization(s): Start Today, Zozotown, ZOZO
- Spouse: Divorced
- Children: 3
- Space career

Space Adventures space tourist
- Time in space: 11 days, 19 hours, 34 minutes
- Missions: Soyuz MS-20

Yusaku Maezawa (前澤 友作, Maezawa Yūsaku; born 22 November 1975) is a Japanese billionaire entrepreneur, space tourist, and art collector. He founded Start Today in 1998 and launched the online fashion retail website Zozotown in 2004, now Japan's largest.

Maezawa introduced a custom-fit apparel brand Zozo and at-home measurement system, the Zozosuit, in 2018. As of July 2025, he was estimated by Forbes to have a net worth of $1.5 billion.

== Early life ==
Maezawa began attending Waseda Jitsugyo High School, Tokyo, in 1991, where he started a hardcore punk band with his classmates called Switch Style, in which he was the drummer. The band released their first EP in 1993. After graduating from high school, he decided not to go to college; instead he moved to the US with a girlfriend, where he started collecting CDs and records. When he returned to Japan in 1995, his album collection became the basis for his first company, which sold imported albums and CDs through the mail.

== Business ==
In 1998, Maezawa used the basis of the mail-order album business to launch the company Start Today. The same year, his band signed with the label BMG Japan. By 2000, Start Today had moved to an online platform, had begun selling clothing, and had become a public company. In 2001, Maezawa declared a hiatus on his music career. Start Today opened the retail clothing website Zozotown in 2004, and six years later, Start Today became a publicly traded company, listed on the "Mothers" Index of the Tokyo Stock Exchange. By 2012, Start Today was listed in the First Section of the Tokyo Stock Exchange. Forbes listed him in its World's Youngest Billionaires 2011 ranking, and Wealth-X for CNBC ranked him 8th richest entrepreneurs under 40 in Asia in 2015.

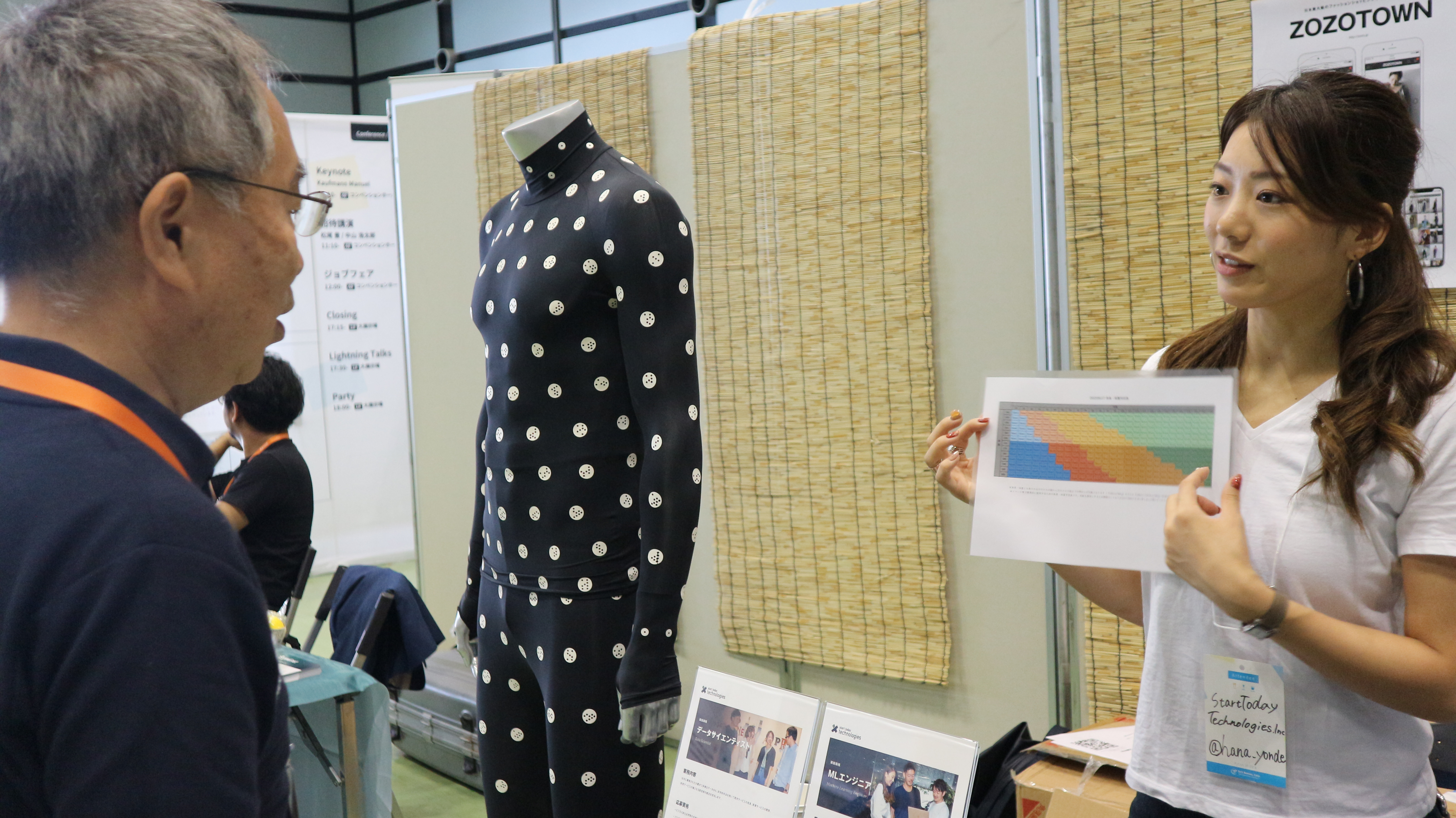
Zozosuit demo

In 2018, Maezawa introduced Zozo, a custom-fit clothing brand and the Zozosuit an at-home measurement system, in over 72 countries and territories.

Maezawa resigned from Zozo in September 2019 after selling a stake of 50.1% in the company to SoftBank for US$3.7 billion (400 billion Yen). He also sold 30% of his personal stake in ZoZo to Yahoo Japan. In 2023, he invested $23 million in the satellite company Astroscale.

== Contemporary Art Foundation ==
Maezawa is the founder of the Tokyo-based Contemporary Art Foundation, which he started in 2012 with a goal of "supporting young artists as a pillar of the next generation of contemporary art." The Contemporary Art Foundation currently hosts collection shows twice a year. In May 2016, Maezawa attracted significant media attention with a record purchase price at auction of $57.3 million for an Untitled (1982) artwork of a devil by Jean-Michel Basquiat, and broke a record again in May 2017 with a $110.5 million auction for another Untitled (1982) of a skull by the same artist. At the same 2016 auction, Maezawa bought pieces by Bruce Nauman, Alexander Calder, Richard Prince, and Jeff Koons, spending a total of $98 million over two days. Maezawa plans to open a contemporary art museum in Chiba, which will house his collection. In 2022, Maezawa sold an untitled Basquiat Painting for $85 Million.

== Spaceflights ==
=== Proposed circumlunar flight ===
On 17 September 2018, it was announced that Maezawa was to become the first commercial passenger to perform a flyby of the Moon. He was to fly on board a SpaceX Starship, which has been in development since 2017. The flight was slated to take place no earlier than 2023 with a duration of around six days. Maezawa originally planned to take six to eight artists with him as a part of an art project entitled #dearMoon. In March of 2021, the requirements for registration were changed to allow members of the general public (instead of just artists) to apply for the flight. Finally, in December 2022, Maezawa announced that he had chosen his crew members, including DJ Steve Aoki and T.O.P. After the flight was postponed indefinitely following broader Starship program delays in 2023, the project was fully cancelled on 1 June 2024.

=== ISS mission ===
On 13 May 2021, Maezawa announced he would be joining Space Adventures on a trip to the International Space Station in December 2021, via a Soyuz spacecraft. He spent 12 days on the orbital station with his assistant, Yozo Hirano, where he completed the top 100 things demanded by public, as well as recorded highlights in preparation for the SpaceX lunar flight.

The flight lifted off on 8 December 2021, from Baikonur Cosmodrome in Kazakhstan as part of the Russian-operated Soyuz MS-20. On 18 December, Maezawa announced that he will start a campaign in which every participant will receive a sum of money "from space." The campaign started on 19 December. He returned as planned on 20 December.

== Most retweeted ==
On 5 January 2019, Maezawa offered one million yen (approx US$9,300) to each of 100 randomly selected people who retweeted him and followed him, gathering four million retweets and follows. On 31 December 2019, he reiterated this marketing coup, offering one million yen (approx US$9,200) to each of 1,000 randomly selected people who retweeted and followed him.

== Personal life ==
Maezawa is divorced, with three children, and lives in Chiba, Japan.

He commissioned his own Pagani Zonda, the Pagani Zonda ZoZo.

He is the owner of Nausicaä (previously project Cosmos), a 114 meter fuel-cell powered superyacht, built by Lürssen, designed by Marc Newson, and launched in August 2025.
