= Nicola Winter =

German reserve astronaut and former fighter pilot (born 1985)

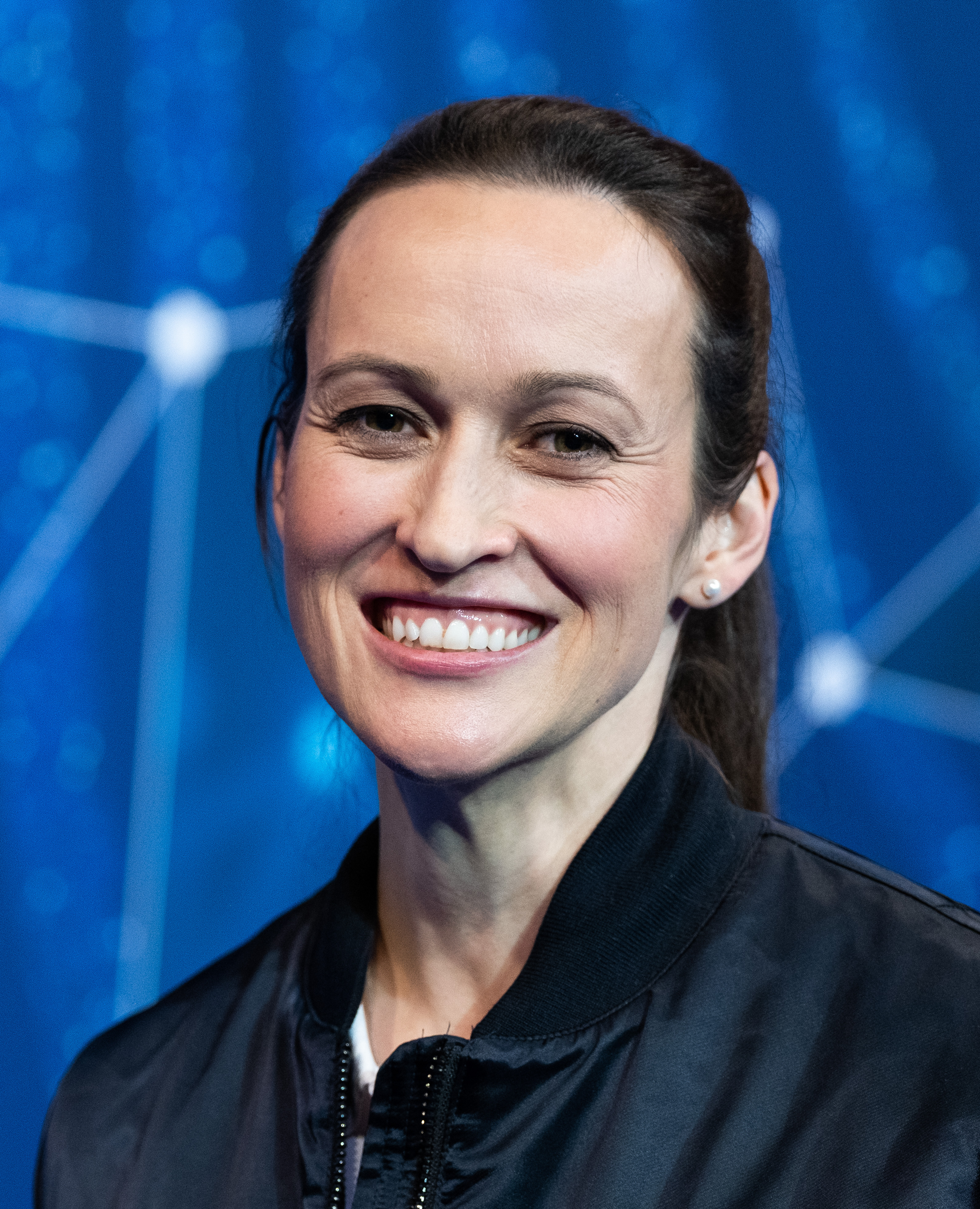
- Winter in 2022
- Born: Nicola Baumann; 10 March 1985 (age 41); Munich, West Germany
- Military career
- Allegiance: Germany
- Service years: 2004–2018
- Rank: Major
- Space career

ESA Astronaut
- Selection: 2022 ESA Group

Nicola Winter (née Baumann; born 10 March 1985) is a German reserve astronaut and former fighter pilot. Winter became the second female fighter pilot in the history of the German Air Force in 2007 flying both Tornado and Eurofighter Typhoon in the German Air Force. In 2017, she was selected as an astronaut candidate for the private spaceflight organisation Die Astronautin, which aimed to send the first German woman into space, but later withdrew from the programme. In 2022, she was named a reserve astronaut in the European Astronaut Corps.

== Air force service ==
Winter as an instructor pilot in the Euro-NATO Joint Jet Pilot Training program in 2012

Nicola Winter's mother flew hang gliders, and her younger sister Nena is a pilot with Lufthansa. In 2004, she joined the German Air Force, attending a one-year school focusing on officer training. She then spent a year in academics to prepare for pilot training set up for 53 weeks at the Euro-NATO Joint Jet Pilot Training program (ENJJPT) at Sheppard Air Force Base and qualified in 2007. At the end of the training cycle, Winter was assigned to the 322nd Squadron in Bavaria, flying Tornados with Major Ulrike Flender, Germany's first female fighter pilot. Flender graduated pilot training about 10 months ahead of Winter, also at ENJJPT. Winter became an instructor pilot at ENJJPT with the 459th Flying Training Squadron in 2012, and completed her flying training as a Eurofighter Typhoon pilot in 2015. She took leave from the armed forces in 2018 to work in management consulting.

== Private astronaut candidate ==
In 2016, the privately funded spaceflight programme Die Astronautin announced it would be taking applicants for the first female German astronaut. All of eleven Germans who had so far voyaged into outer space were men. As a fighter pilot, Winter applied to be Germany's first female astronaut among 86 candidates on the list as of September 2016 and was one of 30 women taking part in the final selection process as of December 2016. She was selected as one of two winners, but later withdrew from the programme.

== Astronaut career ==
Winter was selected as a reserve astronaut in the 2022 European Space Agency Astronaut Group.
