= List of Hispanic astronauts =

The following is a list of persons from Spanish-speaking countries or of Hispanic descent who have travelled into space, sorted by date of first flight.

The first country listed is that of citizenship; the second, if any, is that of the Spanish-speaking country of birth or ancestry.

== Orbital ==
#	Image	Name Birth date	Country	Comment	Missions (Launch date)
1		Arnaldo Tamayo Méndez; January 29, 1942	Cuba	First person from Latin America to fly in space. First person of African descent in space. First Cuban in space.	Soyuz 38 (September 18, 1980)
2		Rodolfo Neri Vela; February 19, 1952	Mexico	First Mexican in space.	STS-61-B (November 26, 1985)
3		Franklin Chang-Diaz; April 5, 1950	United States (Costa Rica)	First Costa Rican astronaut	STS-61-C (January 12, 1986); STS-34 (October 18, 1989); STS-46 (July 31, 1992); STS-60 (February 3, 1994); STS-75 (February 22, 1996); STS-91 (June 2, 1998); STS-111 (June 5, 2002)
4		Sidney M. Gutierrez; June 27, 1951	United States (Mexico)	First U.S.-born Hispanic astronaut	STS-40 (June 5, 1991); STS-59 (April 9, 1994)
5		Ellen Ochoa; May 10, 1958	United States (Mexico)	First female Hispanic astronaut	STS-56 (April 8, 1993); STS-66 (November 3, 1994); STS-96 (May 27, 1999); STS-110 (April 8, 2002)
6		Michael Lopez-Alegria; May 30, 1958	United States-Spain (Spain)	First Spanish-born astronaut	STS-73 (October 20, 1995); STS-92 (October 11, 2000); STS-113 (November 24, 2002); Soyuz TMA-9 (September 18, 2006); Axiom Mission 1 (April 8, 2022)
7		Carlos I. Noriega; October 8, 1959	United States (Peru)	First Peruvian-born astronaut	STS-84 (May 15, 1997); STS-97 (November 30, 2000)
8		Pedro Duque; March 14, 1963	Spain	First Spanish astronaut without dual citizenship	STS-95 (October 29, 1998); Soyuz TMA-3/2 (October 18, 2003)
9		John D. Olivas; May 25, 1965	United States (Mexico)	First Mexican-American Spacewalker	STS-117 (June 8, 2007); STS-128 (August 28, 2009)
10		George D. Zamka; June 29, 1962	United States (Colombia)		STS-120 (October 23, 2007); STS-130 (February 8, 2010)
11		Joseph M. Acaba; May 17, 1967	United States (Puerto Rico)	First Puerto Rican astronaut	STS-119 (March 15, 2009); Soyuz TMA-04M (May 15, 2012); Soyuz MS-06 (September 12, 2017)
12		José M. Hernández; August 7, 1962	United States (Mexico)	First migrant farm worker in space.	STS-128 (August 28, 2009)
13		Serena M. Auñón; April 9, 1976	United States (Cuba)		Soyuz MS-09 (June 6, 2018)
14		Francisco Rubio December 11, 1975	United States (El Salvador)	First salvadoreño astronaut.	Soyuz MS-22 (Sept. 21, 2022)

== Suborbital ==
#	Name Birth date	Country	Comment	Missions (Launch date)
1	Katya Echazarreta; June 16, 1995	United States ( Mexico)	Suborbital flight to a height of 106 km	(United States) Blue Origin NS-21 (June 4, 2022)
2	Jesús Calleja; April 11, 1995	Spain	Suborbital flight to a height of 107 km	(United States) Blue Origin NS-30 (February 25, 2025)
3	Jaime Alemán; November 14, 1953	Panama	Suborbital flight to a height of 104 km	(United States) Blue Origin NS-30 (May 31, 2025)
4	Aymette (Amy) Medina Jorge	Puerto Rico	Suborbital flight to a height of 104 km	(United States) Blue Origin NS-30 (May 31, 2025)

== Other Hispanic astronauts ==
Image	Name Birth date	Country	Comment
	José López Falcón; February 8, 1950	Cuba	Backup for Arnaldo Tamayo Mendez on Soyuz 38
	Ricardo Peralta y Fabi	Mexico	Backup for Rodolfo Neri Vela on STS-61-B
	Fernando Caldeiro; June 12, 1958	United States (Argentina)	Died October 3, 2009.
	Marcos Berríos; 1984	United States (Puerto Rico)	Selected as part of NASA Astronaut Group 23

== See also ==
- List of Ibero-American spacefarers
