= List of Ibero-American spacefarers =

This is a list of spacefarers natives from Ibero-America.

== List ==
=== Orbital ===
| Nº | Image | Latin American? | Selection | Status | Agency | Employer | Spaceflights | Time in space | Ref. |
|---|---|---|---|---|---|---|---|---|---|
| 1 | | Yes | 1978 | Inactive since 1980 | TSPK | DAAFAR | (Soviet Union) Soyuz 38 | 7d 20h 43m | |
| 1 | (Cuba) Arnaldo Tamayo Méndez | Yes | 1978 | Inactive since 1980 | TSPK | DAAFAR | (Soviet Union) Soyuz 38 | 7d 20h 43m | |
| 2 | | No | 1992; 1998 | Inactive since 2018 | ESA | | (United States) STS-95 (Russia) Soyuz TMA-3 | 18d 18h 46m | |
| 2 | (Spain) Pedro Duque | No | 1992; 1998 | Inactive since 2018 | ESA | | (United States) STS-95 (Russia) Soyuz TMA-3 | 18d 18h 46m | |
| 3 | | Yes | 1985 | Inactive since 1985 | SCT | | (United States) STS-61-B | 6d 21h 04m | |
| 3 | (Mexico) Rodolfo Neri Vela | Yes | 1985 | Inactive since 1985 | SCT | | (United States) STS-61-B | 6d 21h 04m | |
| 4 | | Yes | 1998 | Inactive since 2019 | AEB | FAB | (Russia) Soyuz TMA-8 | 9d 21h 17m | |
| 4 | (Brazil) Marcos Pontes | Yes | 1998 | Inactive since 2019 | AEB | FAB | (Russia) Soyuz TMA-8 | 9d 21h 17m | |

=== Suborbital ===
| Nº | Name | Flight | Apogee | Time in space | Ref. |
|---|---|---|---|---|---|
| 1 | (Brazil) Victor Correa Hespanha | (United States) Blue Origin NS-21 | 106 km | 09m 58s | |
| 2 | (Portugal) Mário Ferreira | (United States) Blue Origin NS-22 | ~107 km | 10m 13s | |
| 3 | (Spain) Jesús Calleja | (United States) Blue Origin NS-30 | ~107 km | 10m 8s | |
| 3 | (Panama) Jaime Alemán | (United States) Blue Origin NS-30 | ~104 km | 10m 7s | |
| 3 | (Puerto Rico) Aymette (Amy) Medina Jorge | (United States) Blue Origin NS-32 | ~104 km | 10m 7s | |

=== Without flying ===
Astronauts who is still on active duty awaiting their first assignment:

| Image | Selection | Status | Ref. |
|---|---|---|---|
| | 1992 | Active | |
| (Chile) Klaus von Storch | 1992 | Active | |
| | 2006 | Active | |
| (Ecuador) Ronnie Nader | 2006 | Active | |
| | 2023 | In training. | |
| (Brazil) Alysson Muotri | 2023 | In training. | |

== See also ==
- List of Hispanic astronauts
