= Marcos Pontes =

Brazilian astronaut and senator (born 1963)

- Official portrait

Senator for São Paulo
- Incumbent
- Assumed office 1 February 2023

Minister of Science, Technology and Innovation
- In office 1 January 2019 – 31 March 2022
- President: Jair Bolsonaro
- Preceded by: Gilberto Kassab
- Succeeded by: Paulo Alvim

Personal details
- Born: 11 March 1963 (age 63) Bauru, São Paulo, Brazil
- Party: PL (2022–present)
- Other political affiliations: DEM (2009–2012); PSB (2013–2018); PSL (2018–2022); UNIÃO (2022)
- Occupation: Fighter pilot, astronaut
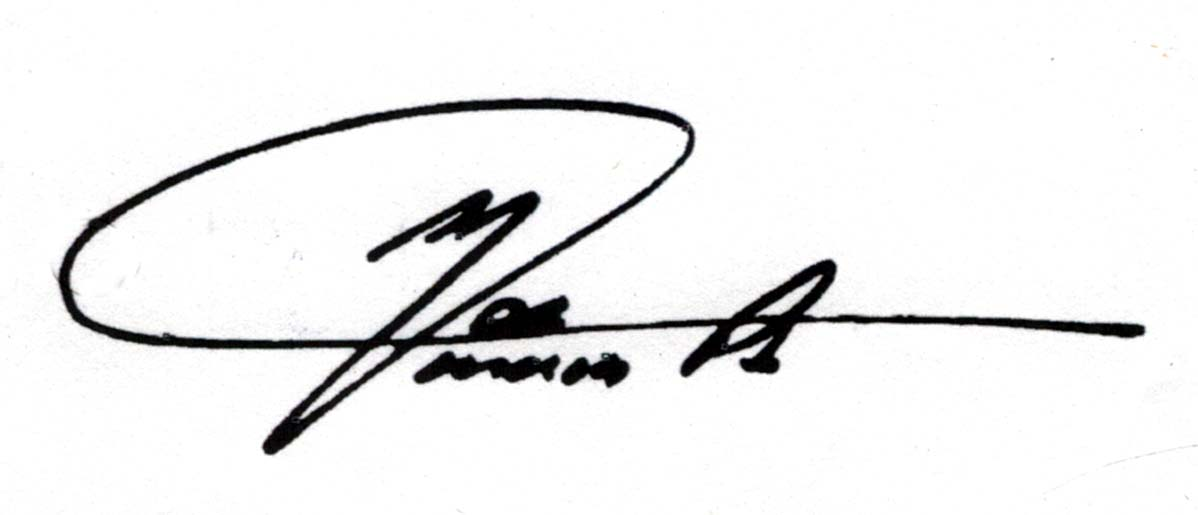
- Signature

Military service
- Allegiance: Brazil
- Branch/service: Brazilian Air Force
- Rank: Lieutenant colonel
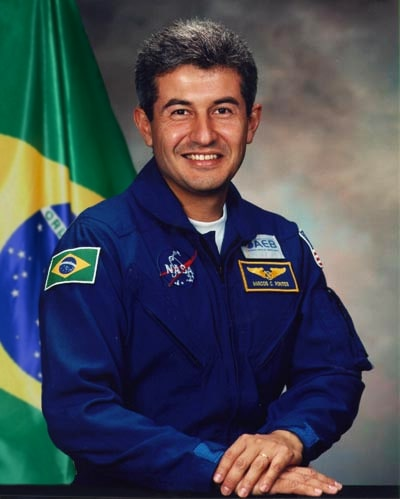
- Space career

NASA astronaut
- Status: Retired
- Time in space: 9 days, 21 hours and 17 minutes
- Selection: 1998 NASA Group
- Mission: Soyuz TMA-8 / Soyuz TMA-7 (Missão Centenário)
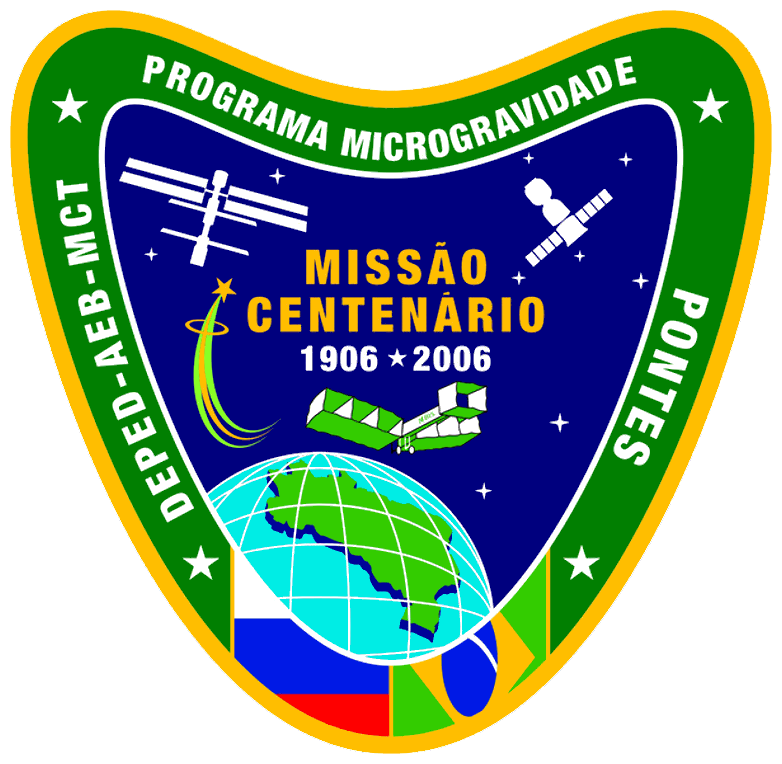
- Mission insignia
- Scientific career
- Fields: Systems Engineering
- Thesis: Polarization effects on infrared target contrast (1998)
- Academic advisors: Alfred W. Cooper, David D. Cleary (thesis)
- Website: www.marcospontes.com

Marcos Cesar Pontes (born 11 March 1963) is a Brazilian Air Force pilot, engineer, AEB astronaut, politician and author. He became the first South American and the first Lusophone to go into space when he docked onto the International Space Station aboard Soyuz TMA-8 on 30 March 2006. He is the only Brazilian to have completed the NASA astronaut training program, although he switched to training in Russia after NASA's Space Shuttle program encountered problems. After Jair Bolsonaro's election as President of Brazil in 2018, Pontes was officially nominated to be Minister of Science, Technology and Innovation, a post which he accepted days later and assumed when Bolsonaro's government began. He left the post on 31 March 2022 and in the same year was elected federal senator for his state, São Paulo.

== Early life ==
Pontes was born in the town of Bauru, in the southeastern state of São Paulo. His father Vergílio was a civil servant of the Instituto Brasileiro do Café and his mother Zuleika was clerk of the Rede Ferroviária Federal (RFFSA).

== Air Force and Space career ==
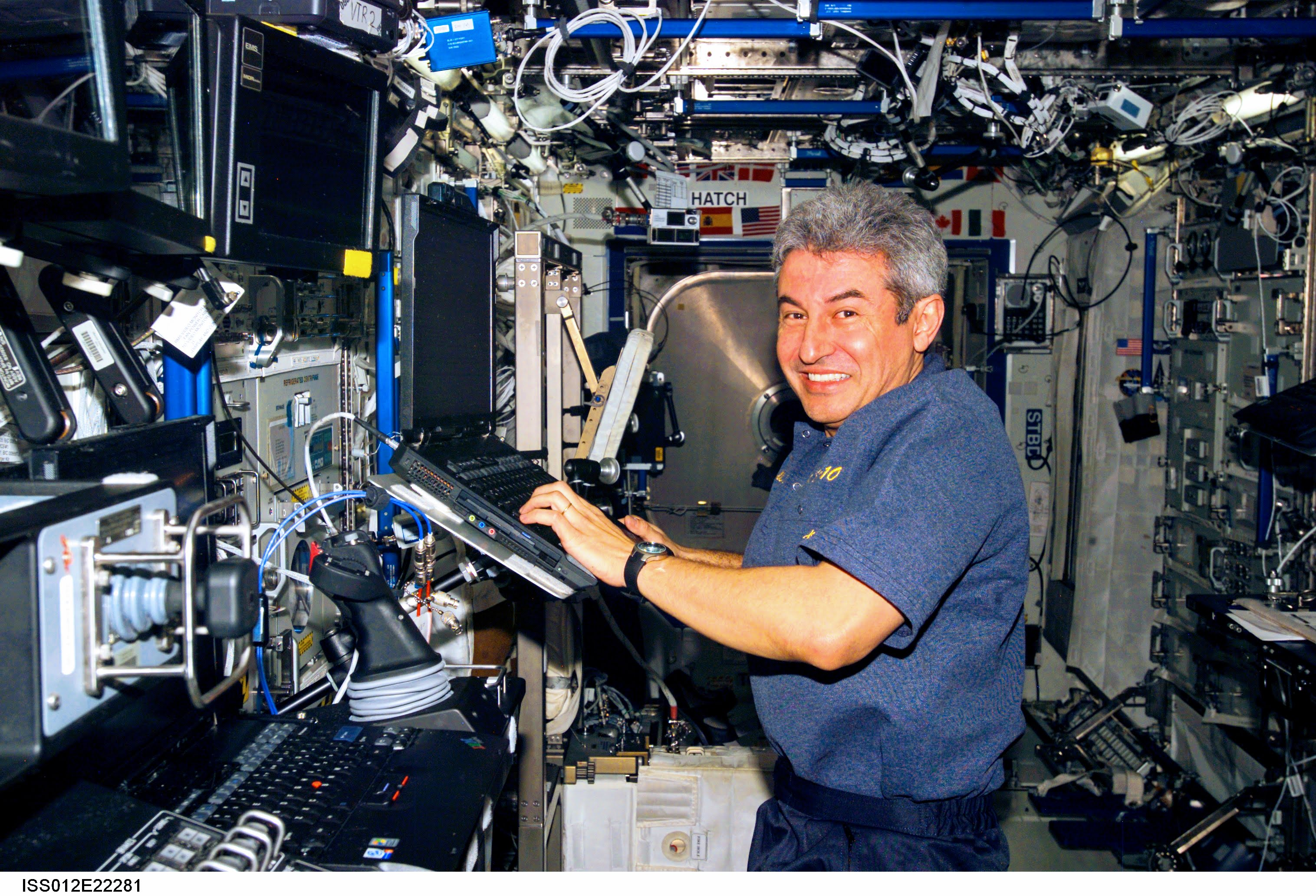
Marcos Pontes in the US lab of the International Space Station

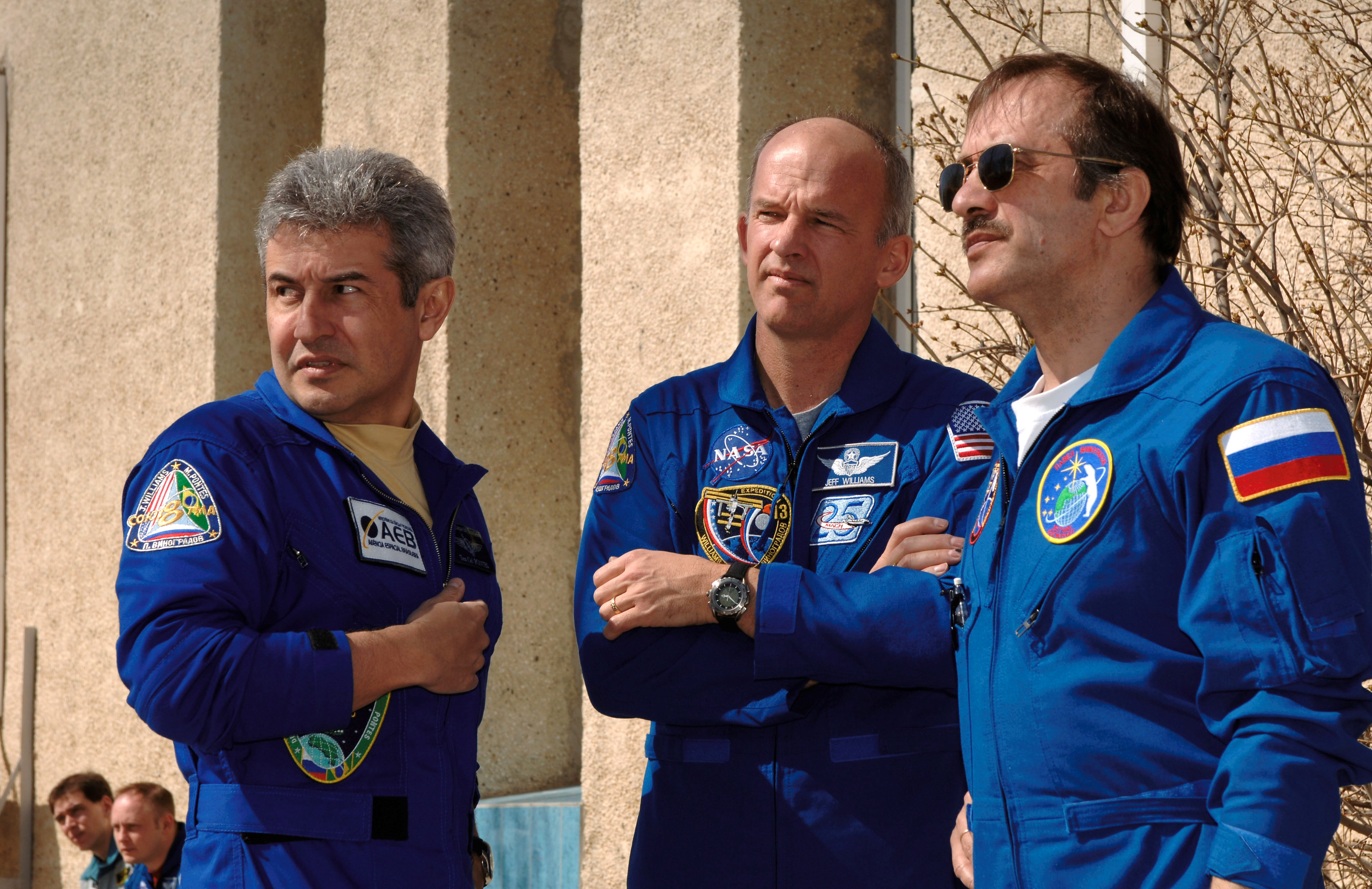
Astronauts Marcos Pontes and Jeffrey N. Williams (center), and cosmonaut Pavel V. Vinogradov, take a break from their training at the Cosmonaut Hotel in Baikonur, Kazakhstan, days before their launch on a Soyuz spacecraft.

Pontes is one of the most experienced jet pilots in the Brazilian Air Force (FAB), where he holds the rank of Lieutenant-Colonel and has flown more than 2000 hours in 25 different aircraft. In June 1998, he was selected by the Brazilian Space Agency to train in the NASA space program after he acquired a space-related background in the Aeronautical Engineering division of the Instituto Tecnológico de Aeronáutica (the Aeronautics Institute of Technology, or "ITA"). He began NASA training in August 1998 and qualified as Space Shuttle Mission Specialist in December 2000. He attended the Naval Postgraduate School of the US Navy in 1998.

Initially, Pontes' maiden space flight was scheduled to be on a Space Shuttle, where he was to help transport the ExPRESS Pallet, which would have been the International Space Station's first Brazilian-made component, into orbit. Negotiations between NASA and AEB (the Brazilian Space Agency) fell through due to budgetary concerns. During the delay, Pontes ran a campaign to pressure the Brazilian government to complete the Express Pallet, and he worked on technical assignments in the Astronaut Office Space Station Operations Branch at NASA. His flight was postponed indefinitely when AEB confirmed that it could not produce the Express Pallet and its components for NASA.

On 2 September 2005, an agreement between the governments of Brazil and Russia was reached which provided for Pontes to train at Star City, near Moscow, to learn about the Soyuz's operational and life-support systems, and to fly to the International Space Station in March 2006. The agreement, which cost about US$20 million was signed by the presidents of the Brazilian and Russian space agencies, Sérgio Gaudenzi and Anatoli Perminov, respectively.

Pontes' flight coincided with celebrations of the 100th anniversary of Brazilian aviation pioneer Alberto Santos-Dumont's successful flight of a fixed-wing airplane in Paris in October 1906.

On 30 March 2006, Pontes became the first Brazilian and the first native Portuguese-speaking person to go into space, where he stayed on the International Space Station for a week. During his trip, Pontes carried out eight experiments selected by the Brazilian Space Agency. He landed in Kazakhstan on April 8, 2006, with the crew of Expedition 12.

Following the Soyuz mission, Pontes returned to his technical duties for the International Space Station Program at the Johnson Space Center, working with FIESP/SENAI-SP on the development and fabrication of the Brazilian parts for the ISS.

Pontes entered the reserve of the Brazilian Air Force and awaits a new space mission. He is also an Invited Researcher at the Institute for Advanced Studies of the University of São Paulo at São Carlos. He is an ambassador of UNIDO and WorldSkills. Pontes opened an educational foundation and a tourism agency together with the future Brazilian space tourist Marcos Palhares, who will be traveling to space through the Virgin Galactic.

Pontes announced his intention to visit space a second time back in 2009.

== Political career ==
In his 2011 book Missão Cumprida, he also declared that he is interested in a possible candidacy for an unspecified political post in Brazil and he tried to be elected as "Deputado Federal" during the 2014 São Paulo gubernatorial election. In the 2018 São Paulo gubernatorial election he was elected side with Major Olímpio as second alternate in the Senate.

On 31 October, Jair Bolsonaro announced that he would be the next Minister of Science and Technology. This choice left the scientific community with polarized opinions, ranging from how the public sees the profession of astronaut in connection with science and the fact that the minister is not an active scientist and researcher, in addition to concern about his lack of political articulation.

=== Minister of Science ===
After the disclosure of data on deforestation in the Amazon by INPE, discredited by Bolsonaro, Marcos Pontes called the then President of Inpe Ricardo Galvão to address the way he has been acting in the media and also declared to share "...the strangeness expressed by our President Bolsonaro...". no matter how much he doesn't believe the data to be false.

On 7 August 2019 the resignation of Ricardo Galvão was published after his resignation on 2 August. He was exonerated at the request of Bolsonaro. Directors of research centres linked to the Ministry asked Pontes to intercede on behalf of Galvão, something that did not happen.

Military Darcton Policarpo Damião was chosen to take over Inpe on an interim basis.

In July 2020, he tested positive for COVID-19.

In a survey published by Veja magazine in October 2021, it was revealed that the minister had made 107 international trips, had stayed 1 in 3 days away for travel among his nearly 1000 days in office, had spent more than R$500,000 (US$ 100,000), and was the minister in the Bolsonaro government who traveled abroad the most. This travel expense becomes relevant after he criticized the government for cutting R$600 million (US$ 200,000,000) from the Science and Technology Ministry.

== Works ==
Besides his work as an astronaut and Air Force commander, Marcos also authored four books:

- Pontes, Marcos (2010). É Possível! Como transformar seus sonhos em realidade [It's Possible! How to make your dreams come true] (in Portuguese). Brazil: Editorama. p. 371. ISBN 9788561047917.
- Pontes, Marcos (2011). Missão Cumprida: A História completa da primeira missão espacial brasileira [Mission Accomplished: The complete history of the first Brazilian space mission] (in Portuguese). Brazil: Chris McHilliard. p. 561. ISBN 9788564213012.
- Pontes, Marcos (2012). O Menino do Espaço [The Space Boy] (in Portuguese). Brazil: Chris McHilliard. p. 60. ISBN 9788564213067.
- Pontes, Marcos (2015). Caminhando com Gagarin [Walking with Gagarin] (in Portuguese). Brazil: Chris McHilliard. p. 120. ISBN 9788564213081.

He also writes articles on his website. The main themes are motivation and space travel.

== Controversies ==
=== Critics from National Congress ===
In 2006, Marcos Pontes returned to Brazil after the Missão Centenário, deciding to enter the Aeronautics reserve. In this sense, the repercussion around the situation became very wide, due to the indignation that was demonstrated by the National Congress. At first, the Palácio do Planalto, AEB (Brazilian Space Agency) and Aeronautics expected that Pontes could offer a stimulus factor to the space program and to new adhesions to the Armed Forces, as well as mentoring and training to new astronauts, justifying an investment of 10 million dollars from the Federal Government, strongly defended by the Lula Government, who even talked to the astronaut in videoconference on the International Space Station: "In few moments in the history of Brazil, we were proud of a Brazilian like we are of you. You, when you departed, reminded me of Ayrton Senna with the national flag," Lula said. After the decision for the inactivity of Marcos Pontes' functions, President Lula did not comment on the choice, which had several frustration pronouncements from other congressmen, such as Walter Pinheiro (PT), at the time member of the House Science and Technology Commission; Alberto Goldman (PSDB), congressman for São Paulo in 2006; Orlando Fantazzini (PSOL) and Sérgio Gaudenzi. In the view of politicians, who expected the return of astronaut learning to the Brazilian Space Program, the entity should create protection mechanisms for possible future investments in other astronauts, taking into account that the services funded by the government are not lost in the private sphere.

=== Investigation by the Military Prosecutor ===
In 2006, Pontes was investigated by the Military Prosecutor to determine whether he had violated Article 204 of the Military Penal Code, which prohibits active military involvement in any commercial activity. In the investigation, the MPM inquired about the website Conexão Espacial, owned by the astronaut's press officer, Christiane Gonçalves Corrêa, then owner of the company Portally Eventos e Produções, about the sale of T-shirts and caps with the image of Marcos from 2002 until the date of his departure. In September 2017, documents were released by The Intercept newspaper, which showed Marcos' supposed status as a partner in the company, but which had always been denied by him. After the extinctive prescription of the investigation, Pontes became a majority partner of the company, with 80% of participation, while Christiane Corrêa kept 20% of participation. The mother of the advisor, who owned about 45% of the shares, left the firm after Pontes joined. In August 2018, after the investigation had already prescribed, the appeal against Pontes was tabled and filed away by Supreme Court Minister Rosa Weber.

== Gallery ==
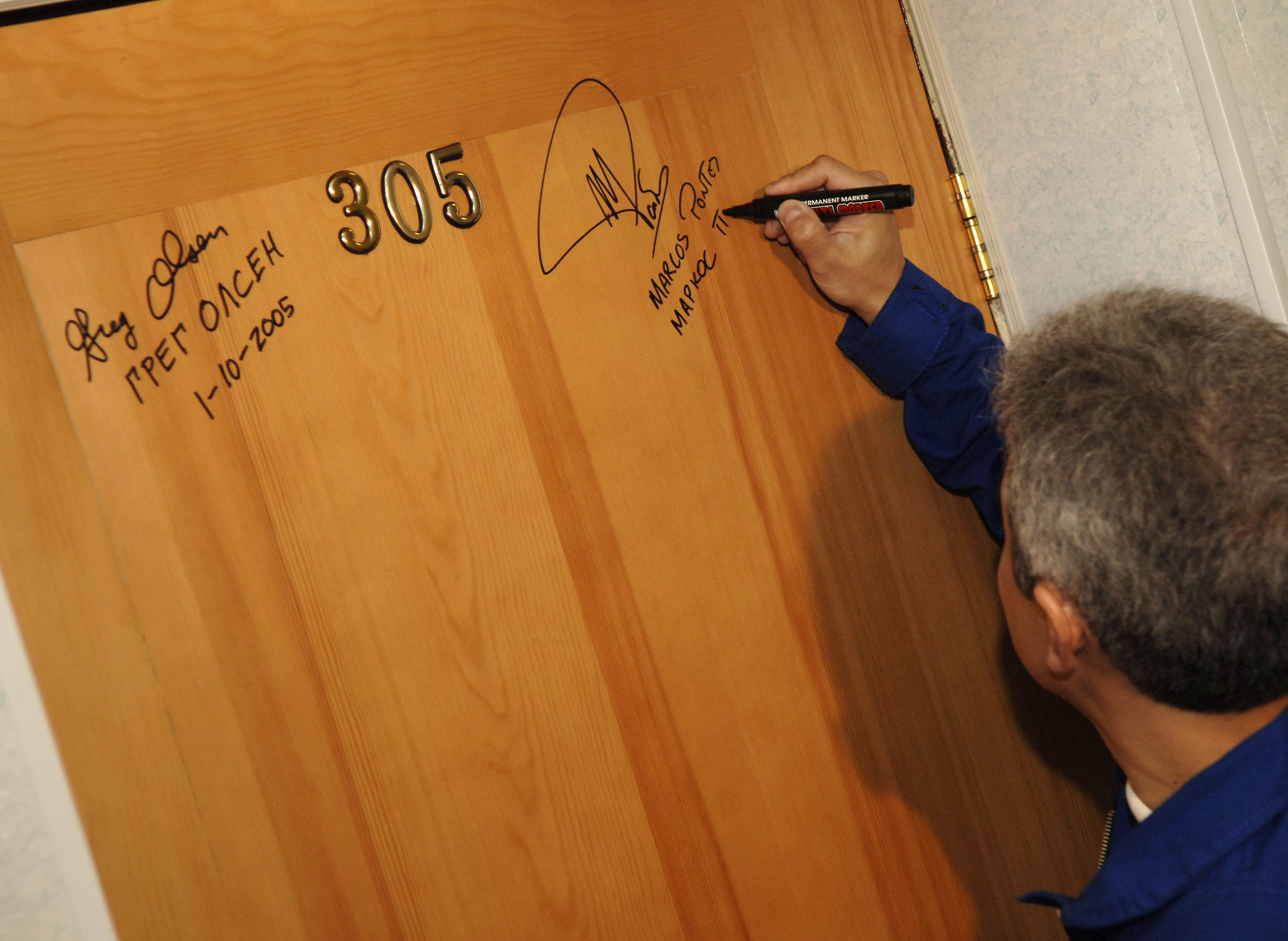
Pontes signing the Baikonur Cosmodrome checkout hotel room, an Astronaut/Cosmonaut tradition

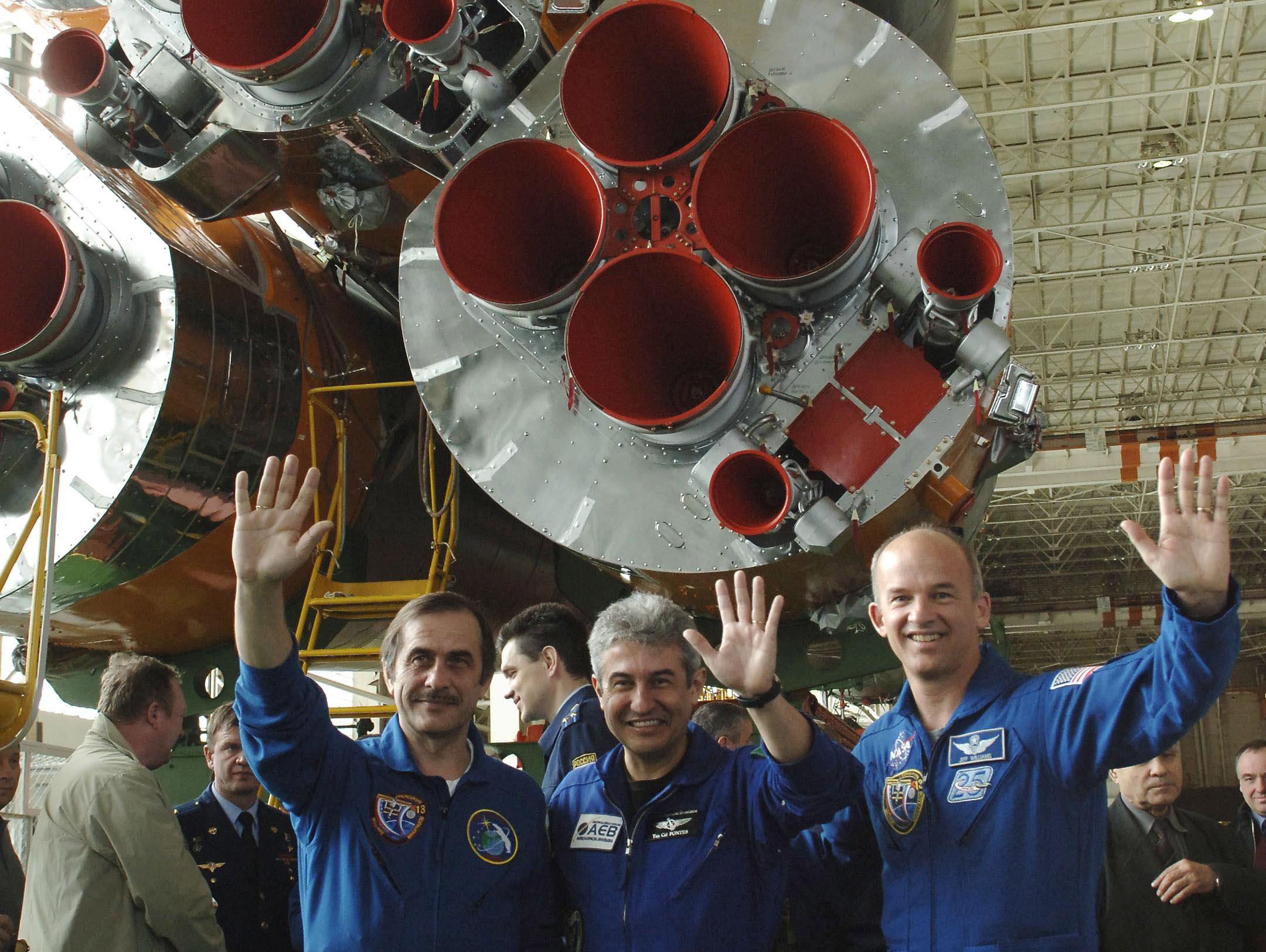
Marcos (center) with his crew members in the Soyuz factory

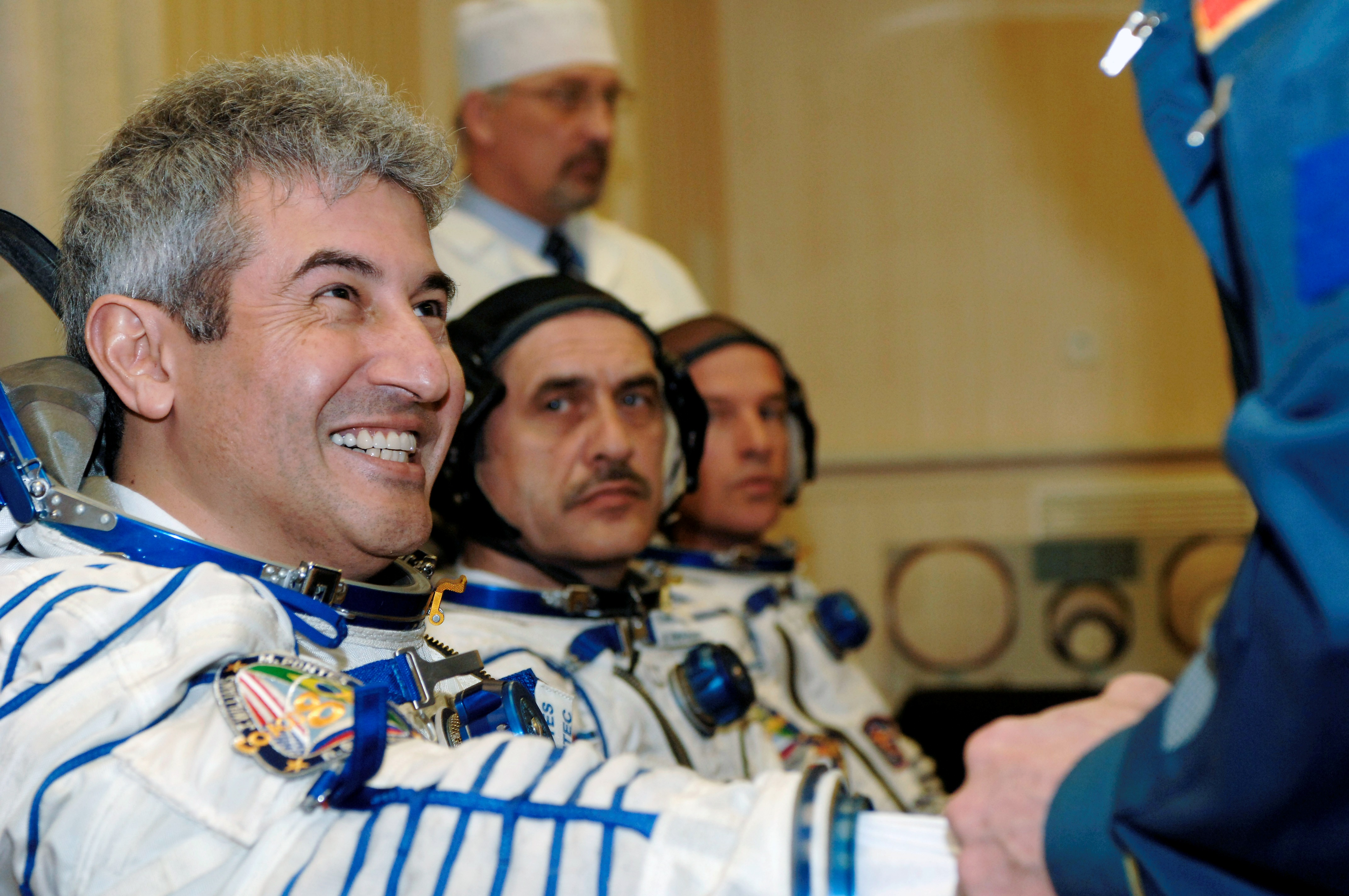
Greeting guests while at Baikonur on launch day

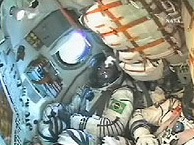
Pontes inside the Soyuz during launch to the ISS

ISS conference

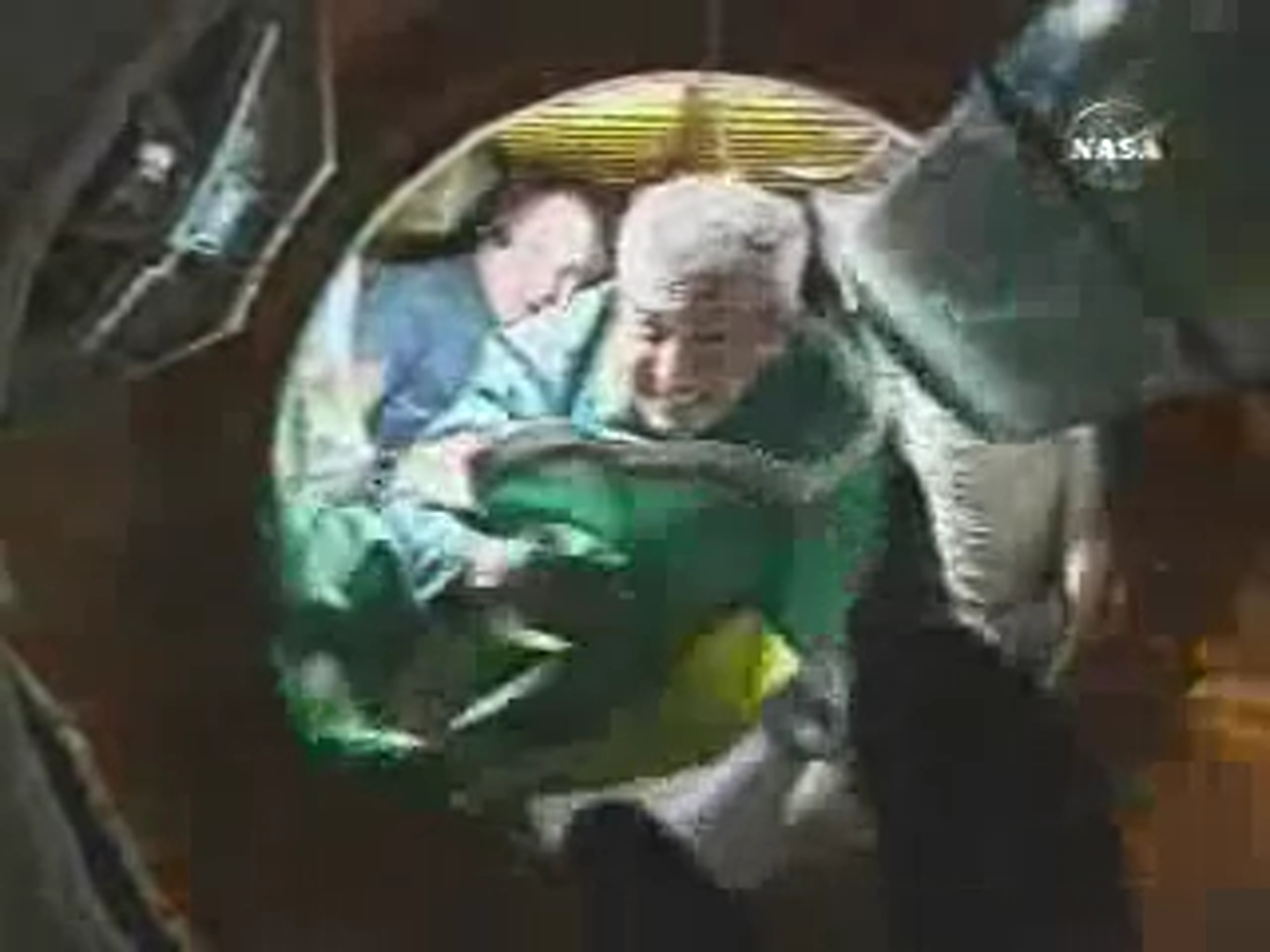
Hatch opening

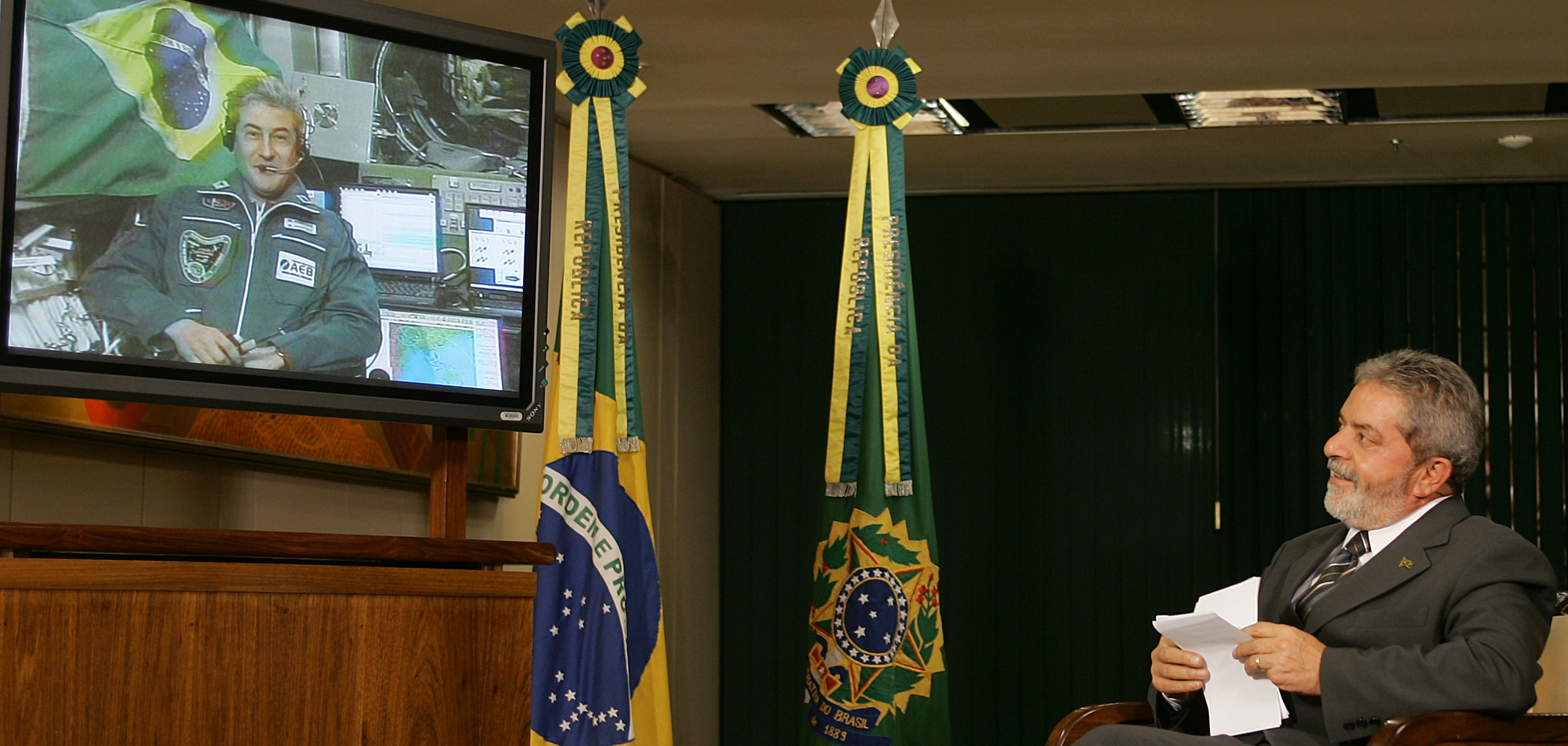
President Lula during a videoconference with the Brazilian astronaut

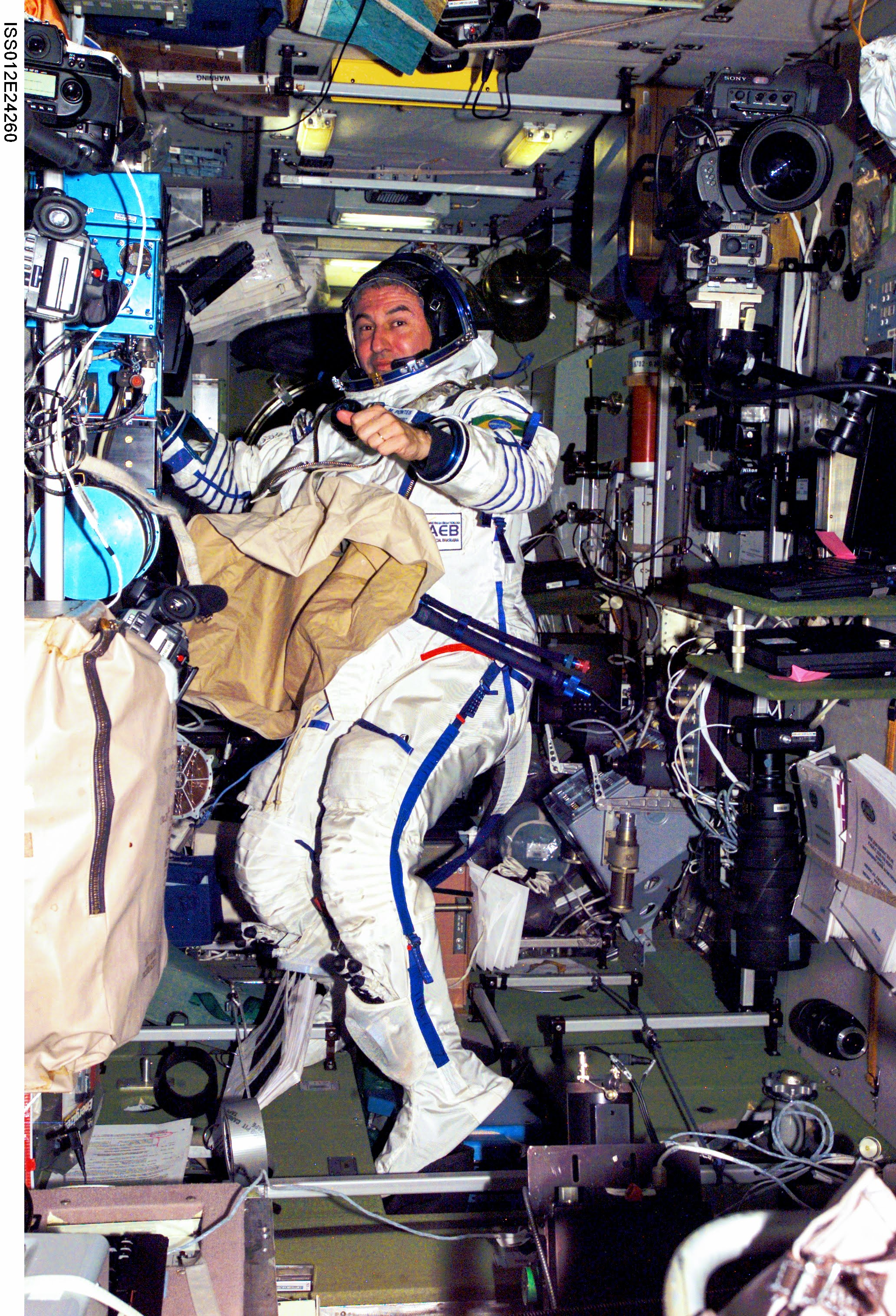
Pontes in the Zvezda service module

== Awards ==
Marcos received numerous awards through his career.

=== Brazilian military ===
Award	By	Year
Order of Aeronautic Merit	Brazilian Air Force	
Santos-Dumont Merit Medal	Brazilian Air Force	
Bronze Military Medal	Brazilian Air Force	
Silver Military Medal	Brazilian Air Force	
Tiradentes Medal	Military Police of the Federal District	
Academy of the Air Force Award	Academy of the Air Force	
Aerial Shot Award	3/10 Aviation Group, Brazilian Air Force	
First Place Award	Officer Improving School - University of the Airforce (UNIFA)	
Honorable Mention - Department of Mathematics	Technological Institute of Aeronautics	
Honorable Mention - Department of Mechanics and Orbital Flight	Technological Institute of Aeronautics	
Honorable Mention - Department of Structure	Technological Institute of Aeronautics	
First Place Award	Course and Preparation in Flight - Institute of Aeronautics and Space, Brazilian Air Force	

=== Brazilian (non-military) ===
Award	By	Year
77th Greatest Brazilian of All Time	SBT	
Honorary Member	Bauruense Academy of Letters	
Personality of the Decade - 50 Years of Brasília	Center of Business and Cultural Integration, São Paulo (CICESP)	
Título "Defensor Emérito da Liberdade, Informação e Comunicação"	São Paulo Press Association	
Commander of the Great Cross - Order of Cultural and Civic Merit	Brazilian Society of Heraldics and Humanism	
Literary Order of Merit Medal	Federation of Academies of Letter and Arts of São Paulo	
Personality of the Decade, Order of Merit of Juscenlino Kubitschek	Center of Business and Cultural Integration, São Paulo (CICESP)	
Dom Marcos Pontes no âmbito interno do Sodalício	Brazilian Society of Heraldics and Humanism	
Personality of the Decade, Order of Merit of Juscenlino Kubitschek	Brazilian Academy of Honours to Merit (ABRAHM)	
Commander of the Order of Rio Branco in Official Degree	Ministry of Foreign Affairs	
National Order of Merit	Federal Government of Brazil	
Chancellor-Mor of the National Order of Merit of Aeroespacial Aviation and Navigation	Brazilian Society of Heraldics and Humanism	
Custus Vigilat Medal	Municipality of Bauru	
Embraer Award	Embraer	
Título Mérito Legislativo em Educação	Legislative Assembly of Amapá	
Citizen of Pederneiras	Municipality of Pederneiras	
Citizen of São José	Municipality of São José dos Campos	
Citizen of Curitiba	Municipality of Curitiba	
Citizen of Sorocaba	Municipality of Sorocaba	
"Milton Martins Merit"	Parauapebas Municipal Chamber	

=== International ===
Award	By	Year
Asteroid 38245 Marcospontes	Cristóvão Jaques - International Astronomical Union	
Yuri Gagarin Medal	Yuri Gagarin Cosmonaut Training Center	
UNO Ambassador for Industrial Development - UNIDO	United Nations Industrial Development Organization	
World Ambassador of Professional Education	WorldSkills International	2008
Ambassador for Scientific and Technologic Education in Brazil	FIRST Foundation	
Distinct Graduation	Naval Postgraduate School (US Navy)	
Commander of Peace of Reserve Forces	International Committee for Peace	
Blue Beret Honoris Causa	United Nations	
Prize Galactic Patrol	World Embassy of Peace, Geneva Embassy, Switzerland	
"Castillo De Oro"	Military School of Aviation "Tgral. German Busch", Bolivia	
"Aeronautic Merit - Great Master of the Order"	Bolivian Air Force	
Honorary Member	Astronomic Network of Colombia	
International Personality - Golden Medal	French Academic Society of Arts, Science and Letters	

== Electoral history ==
Year	Election	Party	Office	Coalition	Partners	Party	Votes	Percent	Result
2014	State Elections of São Paulo	PSB	Federal Deputy	—N/a			43,707	0.21%	Not elected
2018	State Elections of São Paulo	PSL	Surrogate Senator	São Paulo Above Everything, God Above Everyone (PRTB, PSL)	Sérgio Olímpio	PSL	9,039,717	25.81%	Elected
2018	State Elections of São Paulo	PSL	Surrogate Senator	São Paulo Above Everything, God Above Everyone (PRTB, PSL)	Alexandre Giordano	PSL	9,039,717	25.81%	Elected
2022	State Elections of São Paulo	PL	Senator	São Paulo Can Do More (Republicanos, PSD, PL, PTB, PSC, PMN)	Alberto Fonseca	PL	10,714,913	49.68%	Elected
2022	State Elections of São Paulo	PL	Senator	São Paulo Can Do More (Republicanos, PSD, PL, PTB, PSC, PMN)	Sirlange Manga	PL	10,714,913	49.68%	Elected

== See also ==
- Timeline of space travel by nationality
- List of Ibero-American spacefarers
- Brazilian Space Agency
- National Institute for Space Research (INPE)
- Aeronautics Technological Institute (ITA)
- University of São Paulo (USP)
- Brazilian General Command for Aerospace Technology (CTA)

Political offices
Preceded by Gilberto Kassab	Minister of Science, Technology and Innovation; 2019–2022	Succeeded by Paulo Alvim
