= Rodrigo Manga =

Brazilian politician (born 1980)

- Manga in 2025

Mayor of Sorocaba
- Incumbent
- Assumed office 1 January 2021
- Vice Mayor: Fernando Martins
- Preceded by: Jaqueline Coutinho

Member of the Municipal Chamber of Sorocaba
- In office 1 January 2013 – 1 January 2021
- Constituency: At-large

Personal details
- Born: 31 January 1980 (age 46) Sorocaba, São Paulo, Brazil
- Party: Independent (2026–present)
- Other political affiliations: PL (1998–2006); PR (2006–2011); PP (2011–2016); DEM (2016–2020); Republicanos (2020–2026)
- Spouse: Sirlange Frate (m. 2010)
- Children: 2
- Education: Faculdade Uirapuru
- Profession: Marketing professional

Rodrigo Maganhato (born 31 January 1980), better known as Rodrigo Manga, is a Brazilian politician and member of the Republicans. He served two terms as a city councilor in Sorocaba and has served as the city's mayor since January 2021.

Manga began his political career in 2012, when he was elected to the Sorocaba City Council. He was re-elected in 2016 with the highest vote total in the city's history at the time. In 2020, he won the mayoral election in the second round and was re-elected in 2024, becoming the most-voted mayor in the city's history.

Since 2022, Manga has been under investigation by the Federal Police over allegations of embezzlement of public funds, money laundering, and corruption. He was removed from office on November 6, 2025, but resumed his position on March 31, 2026 following a Supreme Federal Court decision.

== Biography ==
Manga was born on January 31, 1980 in Sorocaba, São Paulo. He holds a degree in marketing from Faculdade Uirapuru and worked in the automotive industry before entering politics.

Since 2010, Manga has been married to publicist Sirlange Manga, with whom he has two children. He previously served as a missionary for the World Church of God's Power. In his 2023 biography, Governe sua vida e transforme o mundo (English: Govern Your Life and Transform the World), written by Eduardo Bortolossi, he disclosed that he had experienced substance use disorder.

== Political career ==
=== Sorocaba City Councilor (2012–2020) ===
Manga was first elected to Sorocaba City Council in 2012 as a candidate of the Progressistas, receiving 4,778 votes (1.53%). In 2016, was re-elected as a candidate of the now-defunct Democrats with 11,471 votes (3.86%), the highest vote total for a city councilor in Sorocaba's history at the time.

=== Mayor of Sorocaba (2020–present) ===
Manga was the Republicans candidate for mayor in the 2020 Sorocaba mayoral election. He was elected in the second round, defeating incumbent Jaqueline Coutinho of the Social Liberal Party (PSL) with 52.58% of the votes. During his tenure, his administration introduced projects such as the distribution of free community umbrellas, the installation of public cellphone charging stations, and the introduction of electric scooters throughout the city.

In 2024, Manga was re-elected in the first round with 73.75% of the vote. Danilo Balas, the candidate of the Liberal Party (PL), finished second, followed by Paulinho do Transporte of the Workers' Party (PT). In October 2024, his administration announced plans to build a skyscraper approximately one kilometre tall with 170 floors. If completed, it would become the tallest building in the world; at the time of the announcement, the tallest building in the city was 141 meters tall with 45 floors. According to the proposal, the project was intended to revitalize the city center and increase tourism.

In January 2025, Manga gained widespread attention on TikTok for videos about his work as mayor. Some media outlets have criticized his social media content, alleging that it used "marketing and misinformation techniques". The following month, the Brazilian Workers' Renewal Party (PRTB) invited him to run as its candidate for governor of São Paulo. The party's president, Leonardo Avalanche, said that it was looking to reorganize around younger political leaders. However, Manga declined the invitation, stating that he iswasan ally of Governor Tarcísio de Freitas, a fellow member of the Republicans.

==== Corruption allegations ====
Since 2022, Operation Copy and Paste has investigated an alleged criminal organization suspected of embezzling public funds allocated to healthcare in cities across the states of São Paulo and Bahia. On April 10, 2025, the Federal Police (PF) executed 28 search and seizure warrants at locations including Sorocaba City Hall, the city's Department of Health, and Manga's home and office. The investigation is related to contracts for the management of the Éden Emergency Care Unit (UPA), which has since been terminated, and the West Zone Pre-Hospital Unit (UPH Oeste), which remained in effect. According to investigators, the outsourcing contracts are collectively worth approximately 100 million reais.

Following a regional court decision, Manga was removed from office on November 6, 2025 and was temporarily replaced by Deputy Mayor Fernando Martins da Costa Neto. He resumed office on March 31, 2026. On May 8, 2026, the Supreme Federal Court voted to overturn his removal and restore his access to City Hall.
