= Serena Auñón-Chancellor =

American physician, engineer, and NASA astronaut (born 1976)

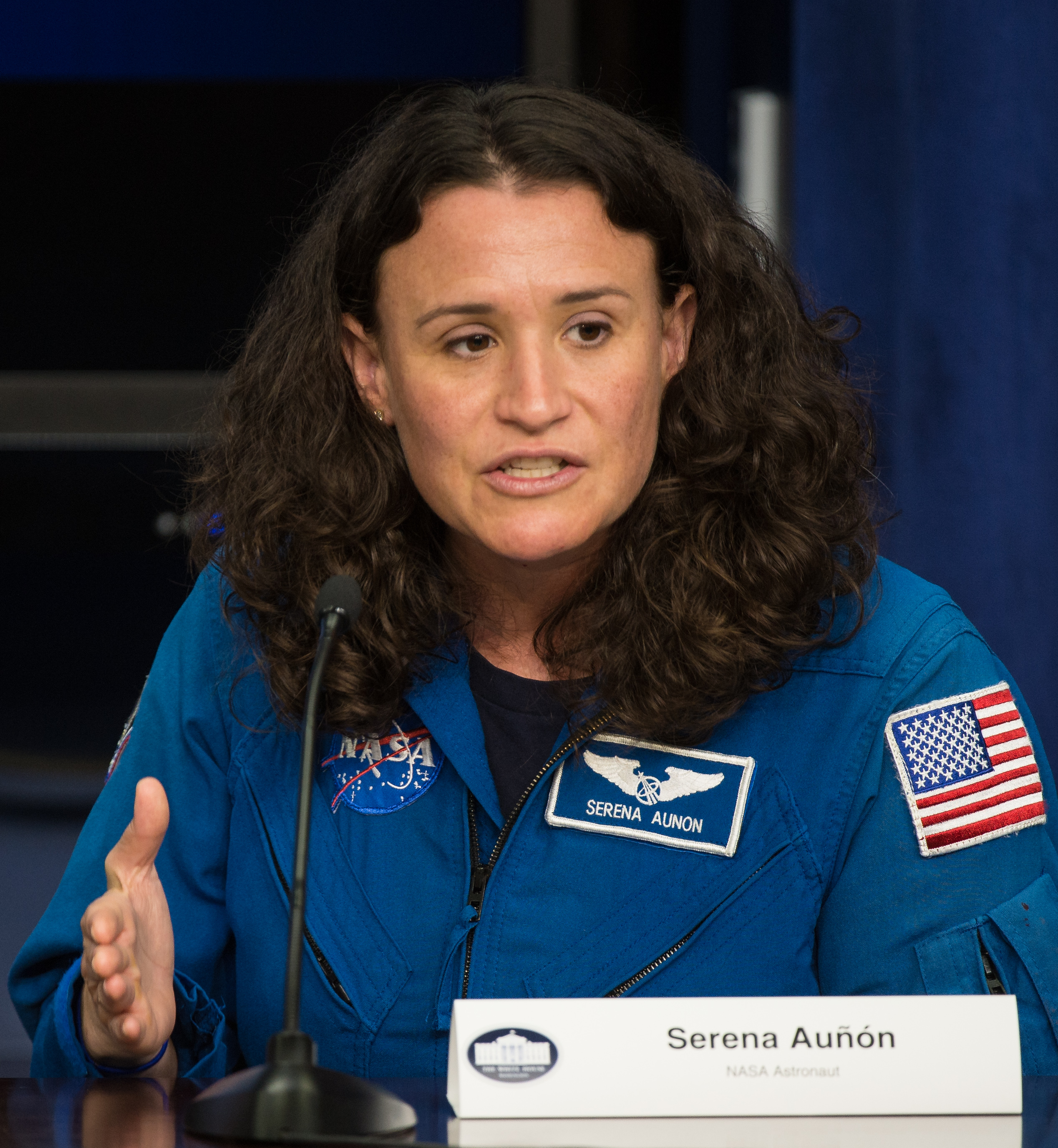
- Auñón-Chancellor in 2015
- Born: Serena Maria Auñón; April 9, 1976 (age 50); Indianapolis, Indiana, U.S.
- Education: George Washington University (BS); University of Texas, Houston (MD); University of Texas, Galveston (MPH)
- Spouse: Jeff Chancellor
- Space career

NASA astronaut
- Time in space: 196 days, 17 hours, 49 minutes
- Selection: NASA Group 20 (2009)
- Mission: Soyuz MS-09 (Expedition 56/57)
- Mission insignia

Serena Maria Auñón-Chancellor (born April 9, 1976) is an American physician, engineer, and NASA astronaut. She visited the International Space Station (ISS) during Expedition 56/57. After returning, she transitioned to a management role within NASA, where she handles medical issues for ISS, Lunar, and Exploration-Class missions.

== Early life ==
Born in Indianapolis, Indiana. Auñón-Chancellor spent her childhood in Fort Collins, Colorado and she claims it as her hometown. She has stated that her enthusiasm for opportunity and perseverance was influenced by her father, Jorge Auñón, who was a Cuban exile who emigrated to the United States. She participated in scientific contests and advanced math classes as a child, showing an interest in both engineering and medicine. She has stated that she took a dual route in engineering and medicine because she was fascinated by both problem-solving and caring for people.

== Education ==
Auñón-Chancellor attended Poudre High School in Fort Collins, Colorado, from which she graduated in 1993. She holds a B.S. degree in Electrical Engineering from George Washington University, an M.D. from the University of Texas Health Science Center at Houston (UTHealth) in 2001, and an M.P.H. degree from the University of Texas Medical Branch (UTMB) in 2006. She completed a three-year residency in internal medicine at UTMB in Galveston, Texas, in 2004, and then completed an additional year as Chief Resident. She also completed an aerospace medicine residency at UTMB. She is board-certified in Internal Medicine and Aerospace Medicine.

== Medical career ==
Auñón-Chancellor was hired by NASA as a flight surgeon in 2006 and spent over nine months in Russia supporting medical operations for International Space Station astronauts. In addition to her work in Russia, she is known for practicing her medical knowledge in unconventional geographic zones. Prior to her medical experience in space, she was a part of an expedition close to the South Pole and worked underwater as a part of the Aquarius Reef Base.

She received the 2009 Julian E. Ward Memorial Award from the Aerospace Medical Association for her contributions to spaceflight crewmember clinical care and development of medical kits to support launch and landing in Kazakhstan.

Auñón-Chancellor serves as a Professor of Clinical Medicine for the Texas A&M Family Medicine Residency Program in College Station, Texas. In this role, Auñón-Chancellor acts as a mentor and instructor for residency and medical students. Additionally, she is the Director of the University of Texas Medical Branch (UTMB) Aerospace Medicine Residency Program, providing physicians with knowledge and insight into the practices of aerospace medicine.

== NASA career ==
Auñón-Chancellor was selected as an astronaut candidate in June 2009. She completed Astronaut Candidate Training, which strengthened her technical and survival skills, in November 2011.

As part of her training, she spent two months in Antarctica from 2010 to 2011 as part of the ANSMET (Antarctic Search for Meteorites) expedition. The ANSMET expedition consisted of a 9-member systematic team and a 4-member reconnaissance team that explored new areas where future teams may go. Collectively they returned over 1200 meteorites.

She served as the deputy crew surgeon for STS-127 and Expedition 22, and as the Deputy Lead for Orion – Medical Operations. She now serves in the ISS Operations Branch covering medical issues, and in the Capsule Communicator (CAPCOM) branch as a CAPCOM.

In 2018, she published research with her husband focused on the medical implications of space radiation exposure, including computer modeling of the radiation environment of a crewed orbiting spacecraft.

In 2021, Aunon-Chancellor served as the Deputy Chief of the Space and Life Sciences Directorate at NASA's Johnson Space Center, focusing on medical support for astronauts and spaceflight research.

In 2024, she participated at the AAPA's Main Stage Event in conversation with physician assistant and astronaut Hayley Arceneaux. They covered their experiences preparing for and resolving medical emergencies when traveling in space.

=== NEEMO ===
In June 2012, Auñón piloted a DeepWorker 2000 submersible as part of the NASA/NOAA NEEMO 16 underwater exploration mission off Key Largo, Florida.

In July 2015, Auñón-Chancellor participated as an aquanaut in the NEEMO 20 crew.

=== ISS mission ===
In 2018 she spent 196 days, 17 hours and 49 minutes in space aboard the International Space Station as part of Expedition 56 and 57, arriving aboard Soyuz MS-09. She represented NASA as a flight engineer from 6 June to 20 December 2018, supporting the ISS's preservation and planning for experiments completion along with her follow astronauts working a daily amount of 12 hours. Following her 197-day stint on the ISS, Auñón-Chancellor moved into academia in 2019, currently serving as a Clinical Associate Professor of Medicine at the Baton Rouge campus of LSU Health New Orleans School of Medicine. She also continues to provide medical advice for NASA's exploration and astronaut missions. LSU Research Magazine

=== Management Astronaut ===
Since returning from her expedition to the ISS, Auñón-Chancellor has served as a management astronaut, covering medical issues and on-orbit support in the Astronaut Office. Although they do not participate in active spaceflights, astronauts in this role stay on staff. Rather, they help by providing ground support for ongoing operations, helping with crew medical assistance, training, and mission planning. For Auñón-Chancellor, this has included bringing her expertise in aerospace medicine to future mission design, helping to improve medical procedures for deep space exploration, and offering medical guidance to astronauts getting ready for extended trips. Even when they are not actively assigned to flights, the position guarantees that the program will continue to benefit from the experience of seasoned astronauts.

In January 2020, she published a case report on an unnamed astronaut who had to treat their own deep vein thrombosis on the International Space Station.

=== Russian accusations ===
In 2021, Russian state-owned news service TASS published accusations from an anonymous source claiming that it was Auñón-Chancellor who was suffering from the deep vein thrombosis that she published her paper about in 2020 and that it provoked an acute psychological crisis (emotional breakdown) in space during Expedition 56 and in late August 2018, in an effort to return to Earth, sabotaged the Soyuz MS-09 spacecraft by drilling a hole into its orbital module.

The accusation was denied by NASA and officials say they knew the precise locations of the US astronauts before the leak occurred and at the moment it began. None were near the Russian segment where the Soyuz vehicle was docked. NASA said they shared this data with Russians.

The accusations in 2021 came during a period of increased geopolitical tensions between the US and Russia. It also came weeks after a particularly embarrassing moment for Roscosmos; during the docking of the Nauka module its engines kept firing causing the entire space station to flip over one and a half times.

== Personal life ==
Auñón's father is Jorge Auñón, a Cuban exile who arrived in the United States in 1960; her mother is Margaret Auñón.

Auñón-Chancellor is married to physicist Jeff Chancellor and has a step-daughter (from her husband's previous marriage).

Auñón-Chancellor is a licensed amateur radio operator with the call sign of KG5TMT. She earned her Technician Class license and was granted her callsign by the Federal Communications Commission (FCC) on June 2, 2017. During the final weeks of her ISS mission, Auñón-Chancellor made random (unscheduled) ham radio contacts from the ISS, generally as the ISS made its Saturday morning and early afternoon (US Time) passes over the US.

Auñón-Chancellor teaches students at Texas A&M University. She is a professor within the Family Medicine Residency Program. Her current fields of inquiry include thrombosis in microgravity, clinical implications of space radiation, and the significant medical effects faced by astronauts during exploration class missions. She previously was the Director of the Texas Medical Branch Aerospace Medicine Residency Program where she helped train physicians who help hope to serve the U.S. space program.

== Honors and awards ==
Auñón-Chancellor has received the following awards and honors:

- 2004 - Thomas N. and Gleaves James Award for Excellent Performance by a Third-Year Resident in Internal Medicine.
- 2006 - William K. Douglas Award
- 2007 - Outstanding UTMB Resident Award
- 2009 - United States Air Force Flight Surgeons Julian Ward Award
- 2018 - NASA Space Flight Medal
- 2018 - NASA Distinguished Service Medal
- 2021 - George Washington University Bicentennial Monumental Alumna Award
- 2022 - Aerospace Medical Association Joe Kerwyn Award

== See also ==
- List of female astronauts
- List of Hispanic astronauts
