= List of mayors of Sorocaba =

This is a listing of all those that have served as the mayor of the city of Sorocaba, São Paulo, Brazil.

#	Name	Took office	Left office	Political party	Vice Mayor
1	José Vaz Guimarães	5 January 1895	5 January 1896	Paulista Republican Party (PRP)	—
2	Augusto da Silveira Franco	5 January 1896	5 January 1899	Paulista Republican Party (PRP)	—
3	José Dias de Arruda	5 January 1899	5 January 1901	Paulista Republican Party (PRP)	—
4	Francisco Loureiro	5 January 1901	5 January 1902	Paulista Republican Party (PRP)	—
5	João Ribeiro de Carvalho Braga	5 January 1902	15 April 1902	Paulista Republican Party (PRP)	—
6	José de Barros	15 April 1902	5 January 1908	Paulista Republican Party (PRP)	—
7	João Clímaco de Camargo Pires	5 January 1908	5 January 1911	Paulista Republican Party (PRP)	—
8	Álvaro Soares	5 January 1911	14 March 1913	Paulista Republican Party (PRP)	—
9	Joaquim Eugenio Monteiro de Barros	14 March 1913	5 January 1914	Paulista Republican Party (PRP)	—
10	Augusto César do Nascimento Filho	5 January 1914	5 January 1921	Paulista Republican Party (PRP)	—
11	Joaquim Eugenio Monteiro de Barros	5 January 1921	5 January 1923	Paulista Republican Party (PRP)	—
12	João Clímaco de Camargo Pires	5 January 1923	5 January 1926	Paulista Republican Party (PRP)	—
13	Luís Pereira de Campos Vergueiro	5 January 1926	5 January 1927	Paulista Republican Party (PRP)	—
14	Jorge Moisés Betti	5 January 1927	5 January 1929	Paulista Republican Party (PRP)	—
15	João Machado de Araujo	5 January 1929	5 October 1930	Paulista Republican Party (PRP)	—
16	Otacílio Malheiros	5 October 1930	11 July 1932	Paulista Republican Party (PRP)	—
17	Ernesto de Campos	11 July 1932	6 October 1932	PSD	—
18	David Alves Athaide	6 October 1932	1 February 1933	PSD	—
19	João da Costa Marques	1 February 1933	5 July de 1933	PSD	—
20	Ary Cruz	5 July de 1933	6 September 1933	PSD	—
21	Eugênio Salerno	6 September 1933	1 September 1935	PSD	—
22	Francisco de Paula Camargo	1 September 1935	22 May 1936	PPR	—
23	Porfirio Loureiro	22 May 1936	2 July 1936	PPR	—
24	Alcino de Oliveira Rosa	2 July 1936	29 July 1938	PPR	—
25	Augusto César do Nascimento Filho	29 July 1938	2 July 1943	PPR	—
26	José Fernal	2 July 1943	4 October 1945	PPR	—
27	Mário Schimidt Ingles de Souza	4 October 1945	15 January 1946	Social Democratic Party (PSD)	—
28	Doracy Amaral	15 January 1946	27 April 1946	Social Democratic Party (PSD)	—
29	João Wagner Wey	27 April 1946	14 March 1947	Christian Democratic Party (PDC)	—
30	Doracy Amaral	14 March 1947	29 April 1947	Christian Democratic Party (PDC)	—
31	Nelson da Costa Marques	29 April 1947	20 June 1947	Christian Democratic Party (PDC)	—
32	Jorge Frederico Schrepel	20 June 1947	1 January 1948	Christian Democratic Party (PDC)	—
33	Gualberto Moreira	1 January 1948	1 January 1951		—
—	Arminio de Vasconcellos Leite	1 January 1951	1 January 1952		—
34	Emerenciano Prestes de Barros	1 January 1952	1 January 1955		—
35	Gualberto Moreira	1 January 1955	31 January 1959		—
—	José Lozano	31 January 1959	31 January 1960		—
36	Artidoro Mascarenhas	31 January 1960	3 December 1963		—
—	Emerenciano Prestes de Barros	3 December 1963	1 January 1964		—
—	Benedito Camargo Santos	1 January 1964	31 January 1964		—
37	Armando Pannunzio	31 January 1964	1 February 1969	National Renewal Alliance (ARENA)	Agrário Nunes
38	José Crespo Gonzales	1 February 1969	1 February 1973	National Renewal Alliance (ARENA)	Paulo Pence Pereira
39	Armando Pannunzio	1 February 1973	1 February 1977	National Renewal Alliance (ARENA)	Hélio Ferreira
40	José Theodoro Mendes	1 February 1977	5 May 1982	Brazilian Democratic Movement (MDB)	Cláudio Grosso
—	Cláudio Grosso	5 May 1982	1 February 1983	Brazilian Democratic Movement (MDB)	—
41	Flávio Nelson da Costa Chaves	1 February 1983	1 February 1987	Brazilian Democratic Movement (MDB)	Luiz Francisco da Silva
42	Paulo Francisco Mendes	1 February 1987	1 January 1989	Brazilian Democratic Movement (MDB)	—
43	Antonio Carlos Pannunzio	1 January 1989	1 January 1993	Brazilian Labour Party (PTB)	Ikuo Kadiama
44	Paulo Francisco Mendes	1 January 1993	1 January 1997	Brazilian Democratic Movement (MDB)	Edward Maluf
45	Renato Fauvel Amary	1 January 1997	1 January 2001	Brazilian Social Democracy Party (PSDB)	Diva Maria Prestes de Barros Araújo
45	Renato Fauvel Amary	1 January 2001	1 January 2005	Brazilian Social Democracy Party (PSDB)	José Francisco Martinez (PSDB)
46	Vitor Lippi	1 January 2005	1 January 2009	Brazilian Social Democracy Party (PSDB)	Geraldo de Moura Caiuby (PSDB)
46	Vitor Lippi	1 January 2009	1 January 2013	Brazilian Social Democracy Party (PSDB)	José Ailton Ribeiro (PSDB)
47	Antonio Carlos Pannunzio	1 January 2013	1 January 2017	Brazilian Social Democracy Party (PSDB)	Edith Maria Garboggini Di Giorgi (PSDB)
48	José Caldini Crespo	1 January 2017	24 August 2017	Democrats (DEM)	Jaqueline Coutinho (PTB)
49	Jaqueline Coutinho	24 August 2017	6 October 2017	Brazilian Labour Party (PTB)	—
48	José Caldini Crespo	6 October 2017	2 August 2019	Democrats (DEM)	Jaqueline Coutinho (PTB)
49	Jaqueline Coutinho	2 August 2019	1 January 2021	Brazilian Labour Party (PTB) Democratic Labour Party (PDT) Social Liberal Party (PSL)	—
50	Rodrigo Manga	1 January 2021	6 November 2025	Republicans (REPUBLICANOS)	Fernando Martins da Costa Neto (PSD)
—	Fernando Martins da Costa Neto Acting	6 November 2025	current	Social Democratic Party (PSD)	—
