= Katya Echazarreta =

Mexican astronaut, electrical engineer and science YouTuber

- Born: June 15, 1995 (age 31); Guadalajara, Mexico
- Education: University of California, Los Angeles; Johns Hopkins University
- Scientific career
- Fields: Electrical engineering; science communication
- Workplaces: NASA Jet Propulsion Laboratory; University of California, Los Angeles; Rutgers University
- Website: www.katechazarreta.com

Katya Celeste Echazarreta González (born June 15, 1995) is a Mexican and American electrical engineer, science communicator, and Citizen Astronaut. She became the first Mexican-born woman in space as part of Space for Humanity's Citizen Astronaut Program, launched June 4, 2022.

She worked at NASA, first as an intern during her university undergraduate career, then later as a test lead for the Europa Clipper Ground Support Equipment group. She has contributed to a total of five NASA missions. Around 2019, Echazarreta began uploading engineering-related content to Instagram, later expanding her platforms to YouTube and TikTok.

Echazarreta was the co-host of Netflix's YouTube series, Netflix IRL, while pursuing a Master's degree in electrical engineering from Johns Hopkins University.

== Early life and education ==
Echazarreta was born and raised in Guadalajara, Mexico until the age of 8, after which her family moved to California, USA. She had a difficult first few years, having to learn English while starting at Eastlake Elementary school. “It was definitely an obstacle for me to learn about a brand new culture and to learn a brand new language. I recall being made fun of for my accent, but I was determined to push through. It helped me become really hard working from a young age, and to not be afraid of a challenge.”

After graduating from Eastlake High School, she attended San Diego City College for three years, where she was a part of the Society of Women Engineers, a mentor for the Mathematics, Engineering, Science Achievement (MESA) program, and was a Price Scholarship Scholar. Echazarreta transferred to UCLA in 2016, completing her Bachelor's degree in electrical engineering in 2019.

She is currently pursuing a Master's degree in electrical and computer engineering at Johns Hopkins University.

== Research and career ==
During her undergraduate career, Echazarreta was a research intern at Rutgers University in 2016 for their Research in Science and Engineering (RiSE) program. She co-authored Depth-Inversion "Easillusions" and "Hardillusions": Differences for Scenes and Faces which focused on human recognition of two depth-inversion illusions—the perception of depth structure opposite to the stimulus's physical depth. In 2017, Echazarreta was a research assistant at UCLA for the Henry Samueli School of Engineering and Applied Science, where she experimented with various materials to serve as both the PCB and body of the robot while maintaining electrically isolated portions.

She later obtained an internship at NASA JPL for the summers of 2018 and 2019. Following her graduation from UCLA, she received Suborbital Citizen Scientist Astronaut Training with Project PoSSUM. She transitioned to a full-time engineer at NASA Jet Propulsion Laboratory as part of the Europa Clipper Ground Support Equipment group.

Echazarreta began her television career as "Electric Kat" on a segment of Mission Unstoppable with Miranda Cosgrove. She is continuing with the show into its fourth season. She is now also a co-host of Netflix's YouTube series, Netflix IRL.

== Spaceflight ==
The Space For Humanity initiative selected Echazarreta to fly to space with Blue Origin NS-21 as a Space for Humanity Ambassador. Launched on June 4, 2022, she became the first Mexican-born woman in space. (The five other crew members were Evan Dick, Hamish Harding, Victor Correa Hespanha, Jaison Robinson, and Victor Vescovo.) This was the fifth crewed flight operated by Blue Origin, and their 21st flight overall to reach space. The mission lasted approximately 10 minutes, reaching an altitude of 107 kilometers.

She has stated that visiting space is a lifelong dream of hers and that she is humbled to represent "all of the little girls and women out there who are dreaming of achieving something bigger." She partnered with McDonald's for the HACER Education Tour, speaking to high schools around the United States to share her story and information about the HACER National Scholarship.

Echazarreta has spoken to Mexico's congresses Senate of the Republic and Chamber of Deputies in support of increasing STEM education for women and expanding Mexico's spaceflight program.

In 2023, she founded Fundación Espacial, "a non-profit civil association, with the main social objective of promoting youth, women and children, as well as scientists and engineers from Mexico, to develop skills to carry out advanced studies in the space, planetary, protection of the planet and the environment".

== Modeling ==
Echazarreta appeared on the October 2022 Vogue México y Latinoamérica cover. She presented a talk at Vogue Mexico's Forces of Fashion, discussing her experience with fashion not being fully welcome in STEM and how she is working to break down those stereotypes.

She was also named one of Glamour México y Latinoamérica's 2022 Women of the Year.
