= Space For Humanity =

US American non-profit organization

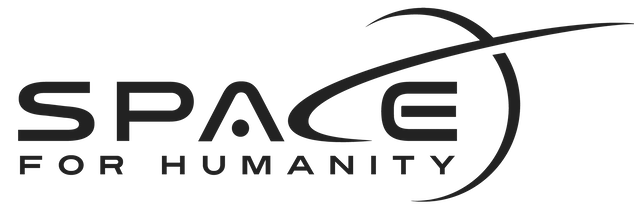
- Company type: Non-profit
- Industry: Space; Aerospace; Space Travel
- Founded: 2017
- Headquarters: Denver, Colorado, United States of America
- Key people: Dylan Taylor (CEO, Founder); Rachel Lyons (Executive Director, J. D. Russell (Board Member)
- Website: SpaceForHumanity.org

Space For Humanity, also known as S4H, is a non-profit organization with headquarters in Denver, Colorado. Founded in 2017 by Dylan Taylor, Space for Humanity is organizing a sponsored Citizen Astronaut Program, where leaders can apply for an opportunity to go to space and experience the "Overview effect," a cognitive shift that occurs in many people after viewing the Earth from space.

== History ==
Space For Humanity was launched at Space Frontier's NewSpace 2017 conference with a stated mission to "send 10,000 diverse humans to space within the next ten years and so doing change human perception, democratize space, and improve the state of the World."

=== Alliance Network ===
Space for Humanity's Alliance Network is a collective of advisors, ambassadors, partners, and their Inclusion Council that have come together to advance the Space for Humanity mission.

=== Partnerships ===
Space for Humanity has a partnership with stratospheric balloon company, The Space Perspective.

Other Partnerships/Organizations include:

- We the Future
- New York Space Alliance
- BOSPlanet
- LifeShip
- SGAC
- SEDS
- Conrad Challenge

== Citizen Astronaut Program and Selection ==
Space for Humanity launched its Sponsored Citizen Astronaut Program to send citizens of diverse racial, economic, and disciplinary backgrounds into space on Humanity-1. S4H opened the application for those from any walk of life to apply for an opportunity to go to space. They began accepting applications for their first program in 2019.

Since its inception, Space for Humanity has sent two individuals above the Karman Line with Blue Origin while moving to fulfill its mission, to inspire leaders with a new perspective from the Overview Effect to bring back to the world.

Selected Persons
Name	Country	Profession	Date Flown
Katya Echazarreta	Mexico	Engineer, Science Communicator	June 2022
Sara Sabry	Egypt	Engineer, Entrepreneur	August 2022

== Awards and recognition ==
- Voted among the Top 10 companies at NewSpace People (2017)

== See also ==
- Commercialization of space
- Private spaceflight
- NewSpace
- Space Tourism
