= Soyuz MS-09 =

2018 Russian crewed spaceflight to the ISS

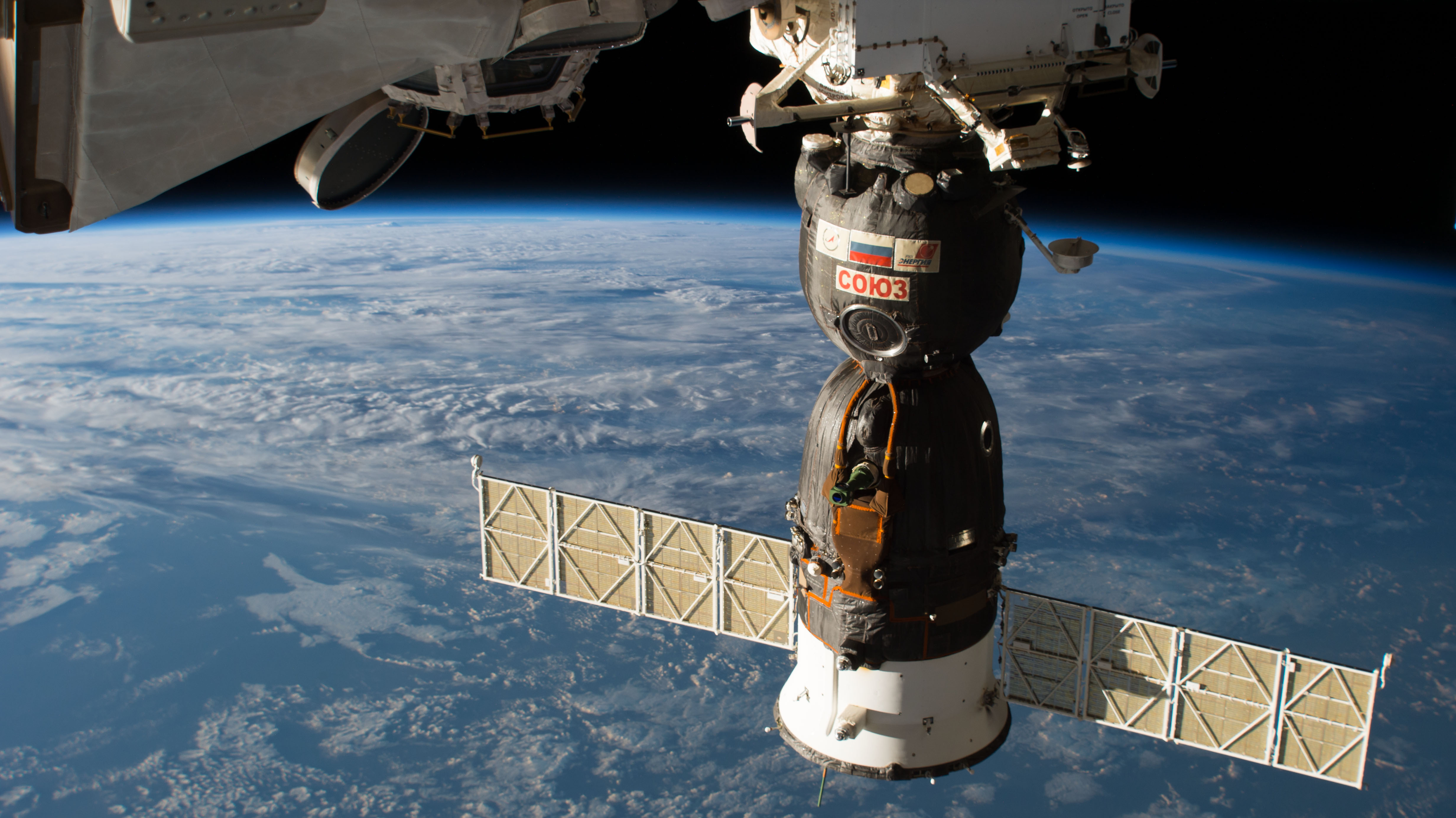
- Soyuz MS-09 docked to the Rassvet module
- Mission type: ISS crew transport
- Operator: Roscosmos
- COSPAR ID: 2018-051A
- SATCAT no.: 43493
- Mission duration: 196 days, 17 hours, 50 minutes

Spacecraft properties
- Spacecraft: Soyuz MS No. 739
- Spacecraft type: Soyuz MS (11F747)
- Manufacturer: Energia

Crew
- Crew size: 3
- Members: Sergey Prokopyev; Alexander Gerst; Serena Auñón-Chancellor
- Callsign: Altai
- Expedition: Expedition 56 / 57

Start of mission
- Launch date: 6 June 2018, 11:12:41 UTC
- Rocket: Soyuz-FG
- Launch site: Baikonur, Pad 1/5
- Contractor: RKTs Progress

End of mission
- Landing date: 20 December 2018, 05:02:00 UTC
- Landing site: Kazakh Steppe

Orbital parameters
- Reference system: Geocentric
- Regime: Low Earth

Docking with ISS
- Docking port: Rassvet nadir
- Docking date: 8 June 2018, 13:01 UTC
- Undocking date: 20 December 2018, 01:42 UTC
- Time docked: 194 days, 12 hours, 41 minutes
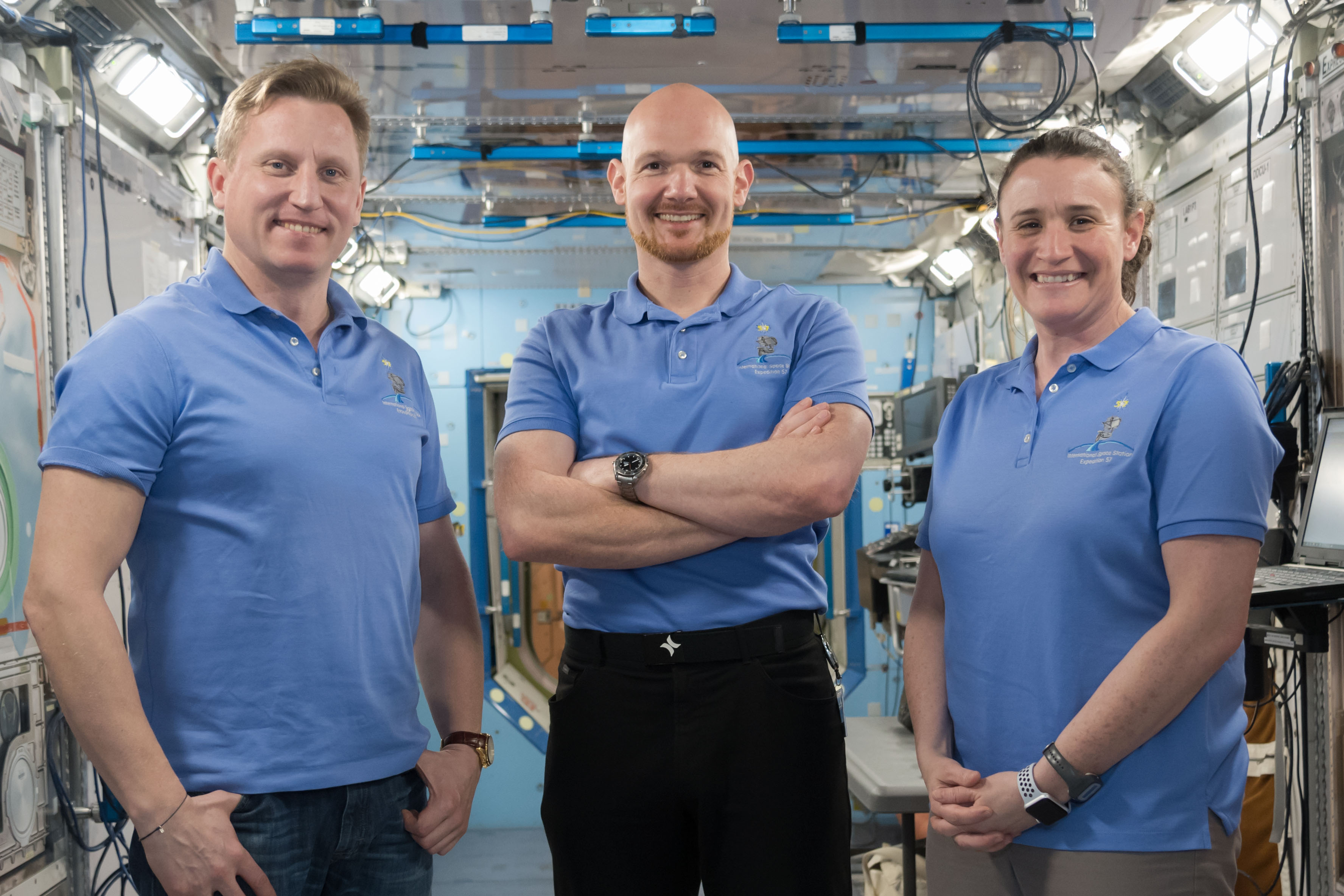
- Mission insignia From left: Prokopyev, Gerst and Auñón-Chancellor Soyuz programme (crewed)

Soyuz MS-09 was a Soyuz spaceflight that launched on 6 June 2018. It transported three members of the Expedition 56/57 crew to the International Space Station (ISS). MS-09 is the 138th flight of a Soyuz spacecraft. The crew consisted of a Russian commander along with an American and a German flight engineer. The mission ended at 05:02 UTC on 20 December 2018. The European segment of the mission was called "Horizons".

== Crew ==
Prime crew
| Position | Crew |
|---|---|
| Commander | (Russia) Sergey Prokopyev, Roscosmos; Expedition 56/57; First spaceflight |
| Flight engineer | (Germany) Alexander Gerst, ESA; Expedition 56/57; Second spaceflight |
| Flight engineer | (United States) Serena Auñón-Chancellor, NASA; Expedition 56/57; Only spaceflight |

Backup crew
| Position | Crew |
|---|---|
| Commander | (Russia) Oleg Kononenko, Roscosmos |
| Flight engineer | (Canada) David Saint-Jacques, CSA |
| Flight engineer | (United States) Anne McClain, NASA |

== Air leak ==
During the night of 29 August 2018, a small air leak in the ISS was noticed by ground control. A 2 mm (0.079 in) hole in the orbital module was discovered, later stated to have been "hidden with a low-quality patch job". Russian crew members used Kapton tape to temporarily seal the leak while a permanent fix was devised. The leak was successfully sealed with the use of a repair kit based on an epoxy sealant, and no further changes in air pressure were noted as of 31 August. On 4 September 2018, it was announced that the hole was created by a drill, but it was unclear if it was accidental or deliberate. Russian officials indicated the hole was some kind of sabotage, perhaps during the module's manufacturing process. Russian officials even speculated that one of the NASA crew members had drilled the hole.

On 11 December 2018, Oleg Kononenko and Sergey Prokopyev conducted an EVA, cutting into the thermal blankets and pulling away insulation in order to examine the external hull, take images of the area, and retrieve samples of residue to be used in the investigation. As the hole was in the orbital module that is jettisoned before re-entry, the return flight was not endangered. The return of the MS-09 crew was briefly delayed by the launch failure of Soyuz MS-10 (until the arrival of the next crew on MS-11). MS-09 landed on 20 December at about 05:03 UTC.

Further reports and investigations were enacted thereafter. Prokopyev was quoted as saying that the drill hole was made from the inside, but it is unclear when it was made. According to NASA officials, they know exactly when the leak began and no US astronauts were reportedly near the Russian segment, where the Soyuz was docked. In September 2019, the head of Roscosmos, Dmitry Rogozin, claimed that Roscosmos knows exactly what happened but that the agency would keep this information secret. On 20 April 2021, major Russian language tabloid Moskovskij Komsomolets published an article citing a Facebook post by Vadim Lukashevich which claimed that the hole was drilled by Serena Auñón-Chancellor, after a blood clot developed in her jugular vein (a medical case which did occur), which was disputed by NASA and called "preposterous" by Ars Technica. The results of a Roscosmos investigation were later handed over to "law enforcement authorities" in late 2021, with state media promoting a new theory: that Auñón-Chancellor drilled the hole while "due to suffering [psychologically] after a failed romantic relationship with one of the crew members".

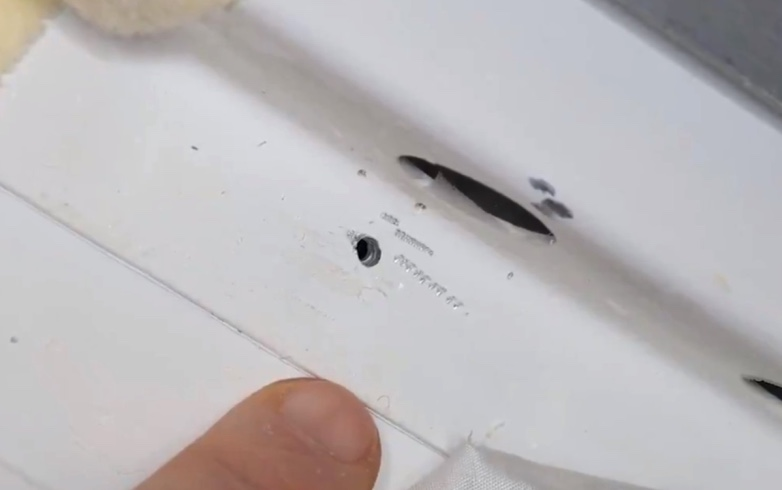
Hole in the Soyuz MS-09 module

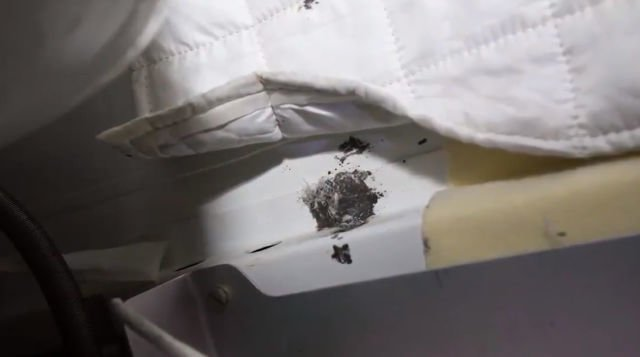
The hole patched with epoxy

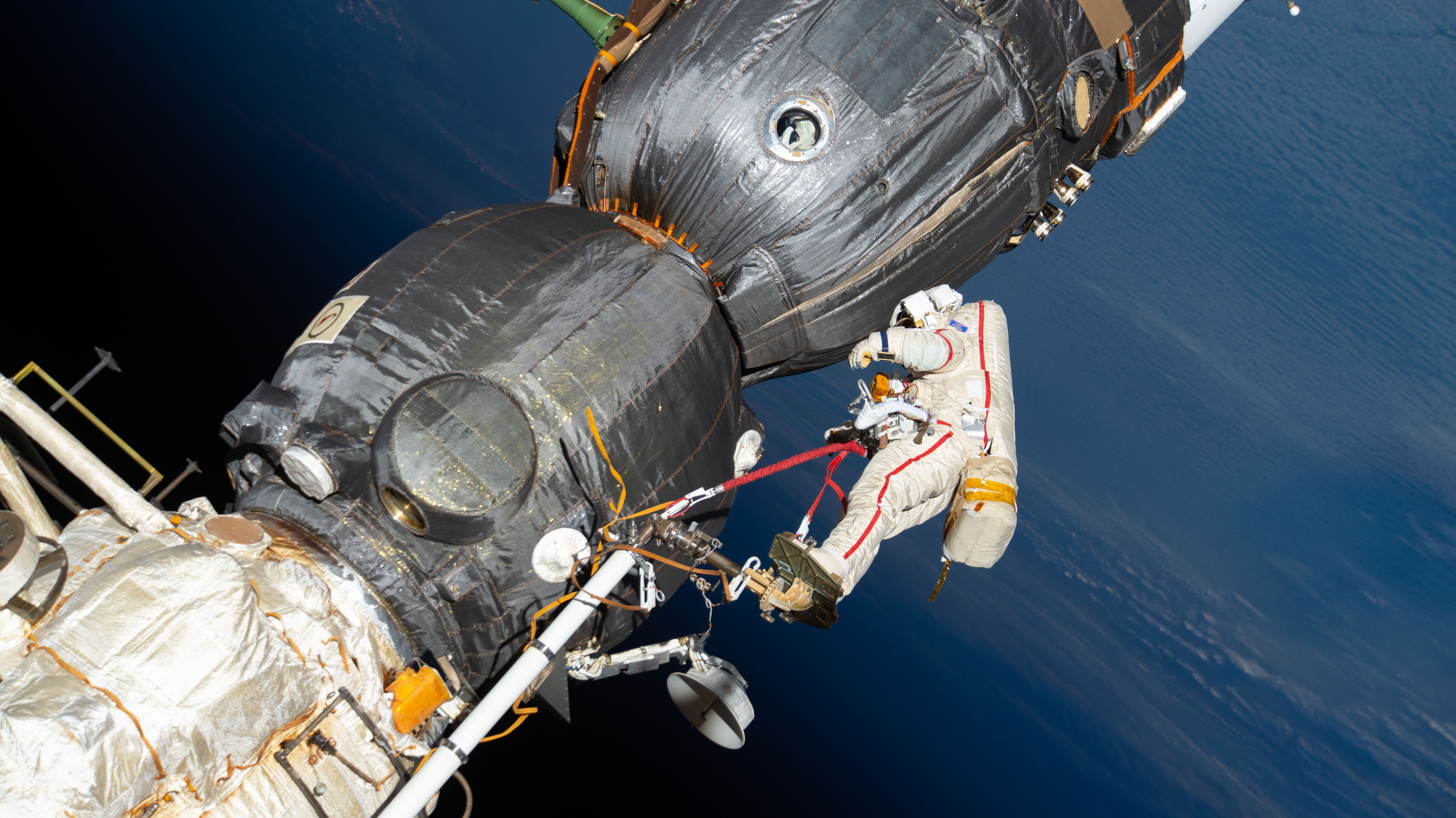
Oleg Kononenko on EVA to examine the external hull, standing on a Strela crane
