= Hamish Harding =

British businessman (1964–2023)

- Official Blue Origin portrait, 2022
- Born: George Hamish Livingston Harding; 24 June 1964; Hammersmith, London, England
- Died: 18 June 2023 (aged 58); North Atlantic Ocean
- Cause of death: Implosion of Titan submersible
- Education: Pembroke College, Cambridge (BA, MA)
- Occupations: Businessman; aviator; explorer
- Known for: • One More Orbit mission; • Implosion of Titan submersible
- Spouse: Linda Harding
- Children: 2
- Website: https://hamishharding.com/

George Hamish Livingston Harding (24 June 1964 – 18 June 2023) was a British businessman, pilot and adventurer based in the United Arab Emirates (UAE). He was the founder of Action Group and was chairman of Action Aviation, an international aircraft brokerage company with headquarters in Dubai. A member of The Explorers Club, he visited the South Pole several times, descended to the Challenger Deep of the Mariana Trench, travelled into space, and held three Guinness World Records.

Harding died with four others inside the Titan submersible that imploded in the North Atlantic Ocean while en route to view the wreck of the Titanic.

== Early life and education ==
George Hamish Livingston Harding was born in Hammersmith, London, on 24 June 1964. He spent his early childhood in Hong Kong, and was inspired by the Apollo 11 landing while watching the event on television as a small child with his parents in 1969. He was educated at The King's School, an independent day school in the city of Gloucester in South West England from 1975-82. At 13, he joined the Air Training Corps, a youth organisation sponsored by the Royal Air Force, and flew Chipmunk aeroplanes. He earned his pilot licence in 1985 while attending Pembroke College, Cambridge. He was a graduate of Cambridge University with a degree in Natural Sciences and a post-graduate degree in Chemical Engineering.

== Career and adventures ==
Despite numerous publications describing Harding as a billionaire, no proof has been available to validate that statement, leaving speculation that the sobriquet was used to drive article views. Forbes noted that Harding does not appear on its list of billionaires, and that his exact net worth is unknown. In the 1990s, Harding worked in the information technology industry. He helped establish Logica Middle East in Dubai and Saudi Arabia, as well as serving as the Managing Director of Logica India until he founded the private investment company Action Group in 1999. In 2004, he founded the business jet brokerage company Action Aviation.

Harding worked with an Antarctic VIP tourism company, White Desert, using a Gulfstream G550 to introduce the first regular business jet service to the Antarctic. Harding also visited the South Pole several times; he accompanied Buzz Aldrin in 2016 when he became the oldest person to reach the South Pole (age 86) and his son when he became the youngest (12).

Between 9 and 11 July 2019, to celebrate the 50th anniversary of the Apollo 11 Moon landing, Harding, along with Terry Virts, led a team of aviators that took the Guinness World Record for a circumnavigation of the Earth via the North and South Poles in a Gulfstream G650ER in 46 hours and 40 minutes. The One More Orbit mission launched and landed at the Shuttle Landing Facility (Space Florida) at NASA Kennedy Space Center in the United States.

On 5 March 2021, Harding and Victor Vescovo dived to the deepest point of the Mariana Trench, the Challenger Deep, at a depth of approximately 11,000 m (36,000 feet), in the two-person deep-submergence vehicle DSV Limiting Factor, setting the Guinness World Records for greatest distance covered at full ocean depth and greatest time spent at full ocean depth. His 13-year-old son accompanied the mission on the surface support ship DSSV Pressure Drop.

Harding flew to space as part of the suborbital Blue Origin NS-21 mission, on 4 June 2022, on the fifth crewed spaceflight of the New Shepard rocket. After travelling to space, he advocated for space tourists (paid recreational spaceflight passengers) to be called astronauts. He also advocated for the United Arab Emirates to expand its space programme.

In September 2022, Harding's company Action Aviation supplied a customised Boeing 747-400 aircraft to transport eight wild cheetahs from Namibia to India to launch the reintroduction of the cheetah to India project of the Indian Government and the Cheetah Conservation Fund in Namibia (CCF). Cheetahs were declared extinct in India in 1952. This conservation project was designated a "flagged expedition" by the Explorers Club with club members Harding and Laurie Marker, founder of the CCF, carrying the flag on the flight to India.

== Personal life ==
Harding was married to his wife Linda and he had two sons and two stepchildren. He lived in Dubai with his family.

=== Titan expedition and death ===
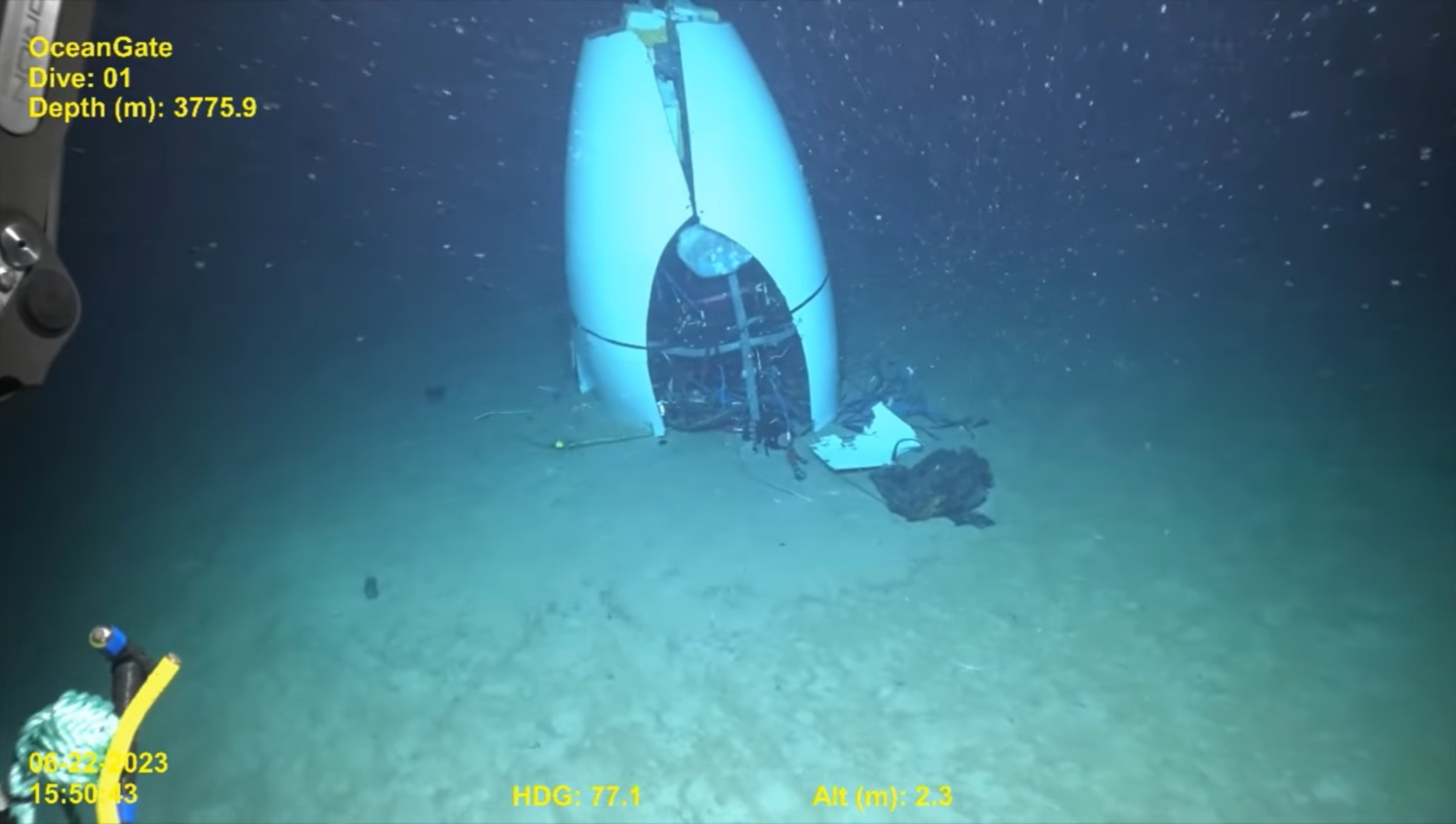
Wreckage of Titan on the ocean floor, 22 June 2023

Harding was on board the Titan, a vessel owned by OceanGate, Inc., to view the Titanic wreckage, when the vessel lost contact with the above-water ship, MV Polar Prince, on 18 June 2023. Search-and-rescue missions involved water and air support from the United States, Canada and France.

On 22 June, two days before what would have been Harding's 59th birthday, a debris field was discovered approximately 490 metres (1,600 ft) from the bow of the Titanic. A United States Coast Guard press conference later confirmed that the debris was consistent with a catastrophic loss of the pressure hull, resulting in an implosion and the instant death of all on board.

== Awards and recognition ==
- In 2022, Harding was inducted into the Living Legends of Aviation.
- Harding was on the board of trustees of The Explorers Club.
- Guinness World Record for fastest circumnavigation via both Poles by aeroplane.
- Guinness World Record for longest duration at full ocean depth by a crewed (with Victor Vescovo) vessel.
- Guinness World Record for longest distance traversed at full ocean depth by a crewed (with Victor Vescovo) vessel.

== See also ==
- List of people who descended to Challenger Deep
- List of solved missing person cases (2020s)
