= Alysson Muotri =

Brazilian biologist

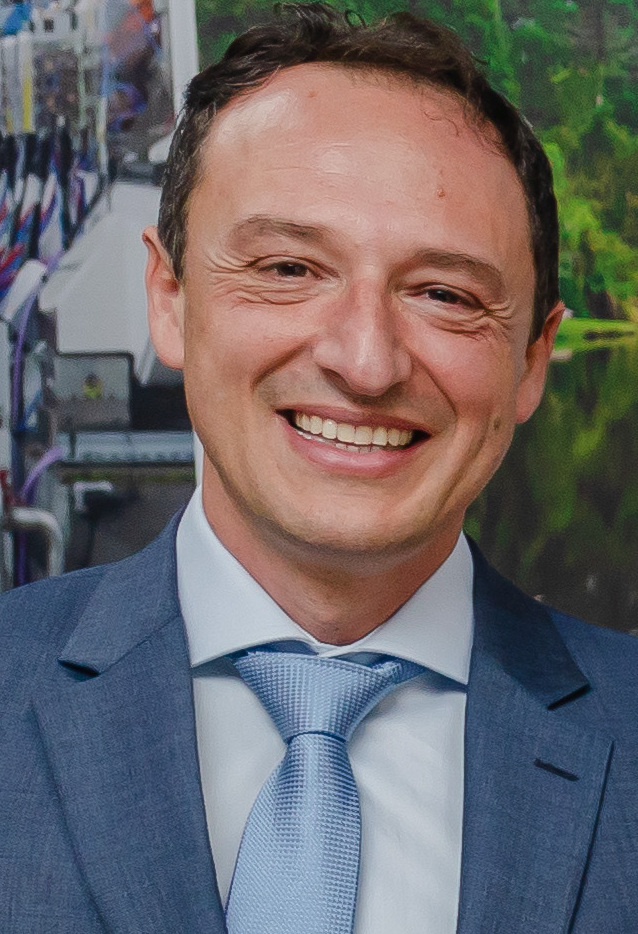
- Education: State University of Campinas; University of São Paulo
- Employers: University of California, San Diego
- Occupation: biologist
- Space career

Commercial astronaut
- Status: In training
- Selection: 2023
- Scientific career
- Fields: Genetics, neurosciences
- Thesis: Modulação da expressão do gene de reparo de DNA XPA por meio de vetores genéticos em células humanas (2001)
- Doctoral advisor: Carlos Frederico Martins Menck
- Website: muotri.ucsd.edu

Alysson Renato Muotri is a Brazilian geneticist and developmental biologist, and a professor in the Departments of Pediatrics and Cellular & Molecular Medicine at the University of California, San Diego, where he directs the UCSD Stem-Cell Program. His research focuses on the evolutionary genetics and neuroscience of brain development, using human and "Neanderthalized" brain organoids developed from stem cells.

== Biography ==
Muotri has a degree in biological sciences from the State University of Campinas (Unicamp) and a PhD in genetic biology from the University of São Paulo (USP). He has experience in genetics, with an emphasis on human and medical genetics, working mainly on the following subjects: DNA repair, viral vectors, cancer, autism, gene therapy and gene modulation. He was one of the first researchers to cultivate embryonic stem cells.

From the beginning of his academic life, Muotri was interested in studying neuroscience. Reading scientific articles led him to learn about the research carried out at the Salk Institute, especially Dr. Fred Gage's line of work, which combines stem cells with the development of new neural networks.

During his post-doctoral studies at the Salk Research Institute, also in San Diego, California, Muotri was a pioneer in showing, in 2005, that human neurons derived from embryonic stem cells were capable of differentiating and functionally integrating into the brains of chimeric animals (made up of cells from two different species). Also in 2005, in sophisticated neurogenetic work, he revealed the activity of "jumping genes" (retrotransposable L1 elements) in neural genomes, showing that the brain is made up of a mosaic of neuronal genomes. The research changed the then dogma of biology, which suggested that all cells in the body shared the same genome.

Using cellular reprogramming (developed by Nobel laureate Shinya Yamanaka), in 2010 he managed to reverse morphological and functional alterations in neurons derived from individuals with autism in the laboratory, opening up prospects for the development of more efficient drugs for Autism Spectrum Disorder.

In 2016, he created a cellular model to study Williams Syndrome, opening up the possibility of investigating the cellular and molecular bases of the human social brain. Also in 2016, Muotri led, together with international collaborators, a study showing the causal relationship between the Zika virus circulating in Brazil and cases of microcephaly and birth defects. In 2018, he developed "mini Neanderthal brains", making it possible to create a new area of science, "neuroarchaeology".

In February 2014, he launched the book "Simples assim: células tronco", co-authored with the doctor Adelson Alves, published by Atheneu, with a cover illustrated by the cartoonist Ziraldo.

In April 2016, Muotri, together with other scientists, founded Tismoo, the world's first personalized medicine startup focused on autism and related syndromes, with headquarters in São Paulo and two offices in the United States, in San Diego and Miami.

In May 2016, Tismoo was the first startup to publish a paper in Nature, having its research recognized in one of the world's most respected scientific journals. The paper is about the Zika virus and its relationship with the high rate of microcephaly in Brazil. Through its mini-brain technology, the Brazilian startup helped to demonstrate the relationship between the Brazilian version of the virus and how it acts to cause malformation of the cortex and leads to this neurological condition.

In December 2016, he launched the book "Espiral - Conversas Científicas do Século XXI" (Spiral - Scientific Conversations of the 21st Century), published by Atheneu, a collection of more than 200 articles published over ten years as a columnist for G1.

In December 2017, the Brazilian researcher discovered in an experiment with mini-brains that a drug used for 60 years against malaria, chloroquine, works as a vaccine against Zika.

Then, also using mini-brains, in a study published in January 2018 in the journal Scientific Reports, from the prestigious Nature group, Muotri's team says that the drug Sofosbuvir, used to treat hepatitis C, can cure Zika infection, as well as preventing the transmission of the virus from mother to baby during pregnancy.

On July 25, 2019, Muotri sent to the International Space Station (ISS), in a SpaceX capsule, an autonomous box with dozens of mini-brains, which remained in space for a month. The research aimed to verify the reaction of organoids in microgravity, for research into autism, Alzheimer's disease and other neurological conditions. And he sent the second part of this research, on December 6, 2020, to the ISS.

In a study published on December 8, 2020, in the scientific journal EMBO Molecular Medicine, Muotri and his team identified two candidate drugs to neutralize the deficits caused by the lack of the MECP2 gene, which causes Rett syndrome, with laboratory tests carried out on human mini-brains at the University of California, San Diego (USA). Two drugs were used which can now begin phase three clinical trials (already approved in phases 1 and 2, proving they are safe for human consumption). The mini-brains "treated" in Muotri's laboratory began to behave as if they didn't have Rett syndrome.

In 2023, his name was attributed for a mission to the International Space Station, originally in November 2024, to research brain organoids. He will stay in space for about 10 days and its expedition will be financed by the University of California. Muotri will also select experiments by Brazilian scientists to carry on his flight. At the end of 2023, Muotri revealed that there is interest from Canada and South Korea in investing in the flight, but it is unclear whether the Brazilian government will have any involvement, and that biomedical researcher Livia Luz should be trained as his backup. In an article on May 1, 2024, it was stated that the flight had been postponed until 2025. It was later reported that the plan was put on hold due to cuts to scientific research during Donald Trump's second term.

== Controversies ==
Muotri has come to be considered, in some contexts, a controversial figure on the autism scene. Some autistic activists from the autistic rights movement disagree with his statements about curing autism and how he approaches the disorder in his public pronouncements. Alysson, for his part, was asked in an interview with G1 in 2013: "You often face criticism of your work. I've even seen people using pejorative terms with the aim of denigrating your image and making a mockery of all the knowledge you've accumulated. And more than that: not only accumulated, but also shared in an accessible way. Why don't you give up?" Muotri replied: "I'm not giving up, because this kind of criticism doesn't bother me. It's not these critics who pay my salary. Those who do pay think exactly the opposite. If this situation ever reverses, I think I'll give up science and become a second-class pseudo-celebrity."

== Works ==
- Simples assim: células tronco. São Paulo: Atheneu. 2014. ISBN 978-85-388-0476-5.
- Espiral — Conversas Científicas do Século XXI. São Paulo: Atheneu. 2016. ISBN 978-85-388-0766-7.

== Awards ==
- 2002: Pew Latin America Postdoctoral Fellowship, La Jolla, California
- 2009: NIH Director's New Innovator Award
- 2011: PopTech Science and Public Leadership Fellow
- 2013: EUREKA (Exceptional, Unconventional Research Enabling Knowledge Acceleration) NIMH Award
- 2014: NARSAD Independent Investigator Award

== See also ==
- Autism spectrum
- Rett syndrome
- Tismoo
- Microcephaly
- Zika virus
