= Blue Origin NS-21 =

2022 American crewed sub-orbital spaceflight

- Mission type: Sub-orbital human spaceflight
- Mission duration: 10 minutes, 5 seconds
- Apogee: 107 km (66 mi)

Spacecraft properties
- Spacecraft: RSS First Step
- Manufacturer: Blue Origin

Crew
- Crew size: 6
- Members: Evan Dick; Katya Echazarreta; Hamish Harding; Victor Correa Hespanha; Jaison Robinson; Victor Vescovo

Start of mission
- Launch date: 4 June 2022, 8:25:02 am CDT (13:25:02 UTC)
- Rocket: New Shepard (NS4)
- Launch site: Corn Ranch, LS-1
- Contractor: Blue Origin

End of mission
- Landing date: 4 June 2022, 8:35:07 am CDT (13:35:07 UTC)
- Landing site: Corn Ranch
- Blue Origin NS-21 mission patch New Shepard crewed flights

Blue Origin NS-21 was a sub-orbital spaceflight mission, operated by Blue Origin, which launched on 4 June 2022 using the New Shepard rocket. It was Blue Origin's fifth flight to carry passengers, and twenty-first overall to reach space.

The mission was originally scheduled to launch on 20 May 2022. However, the flight was delayed due to a back-up system not meeting the "expectations for performance," and the new 4 June launch date was announced on 31 May 2022.

Apollo 16 astronaut Charles Duke was a guest of Blue Origin attending the launch.

== Passengers ==
The passengers of NS-21 were nicknamed the "Crew of Natural Selection". They included Evan Dick, who previously flew on Blue Origin NS-19, making him the first person to fly on New Shepard twice. Also on board were Katya Echazarreta, who became the first Mexican-born woman and youngest American woman to fly to space, and Victor Vescovo, a notable undersea explorer. The flight made Vescovo the first person to complete the Explorers' Extreme Trifecta, which requires travelling to the bottom of the Challenger Deep and the summit of Mount Everest and flying to space.

Echazarreta's seat was sponsored by the Space For Humanity initiative, and paid for by Blue Origin and NS-19 passengers Lane and Cameron Bess. She is a post-graduate student at Johns Hopkins University who has done work on the Mars 2020 and Europa Clipper missions.

Victor Correa Hespanha was the second Brazilian in space. He was selected to fly after buying an NFT for R$4,000 (US$742.12) from the Crypto Space Agency, which entered him into a raffle for the trip. He has been called the "world's first cryptonaut."

Position	Passenger
Tourist	(United States) Evan Dick; Second spaceflight
Tourist	(Brazil) Victor Correa Hespanha; First spaceflight
Tourist	(United Kingdom) Hamish Harding; Only spaceflight
Tourist	(United States) Victor Vescovo; First spaceflight
Tourist	(United States) / (Mexico) Katya Echazarreta; First spaceflight
Tourist	(United States) Jaison Robinson; First spaceflight
