= Sirlange Manga =

Brazilian politician (born 1979)

- Manga in 2026

Member-elect of the Chamber of Deputies
- Assuming office 1 February 2027
- Constituency: São Paulo

Personal details
- Born: Sirlange Rodrigues Frate; 18 January 1979 (age 47) Sorocaba, São Paulo, Brazil
- Party: UNIÃO
- Spouse: Rodrigo Manga (m. 2010)

Sirlange Rodrigues Frate Maganhato (née Rodrigues Frate, born 18 January 1979), better known as Sirlange Manga, is a Brazilian politician who was elected member of the Chamber of Deputies in 2026. She has been married to Rodrigo Manga since 2010.
