= Space Cola Wars =

Soft drink marketing campaign

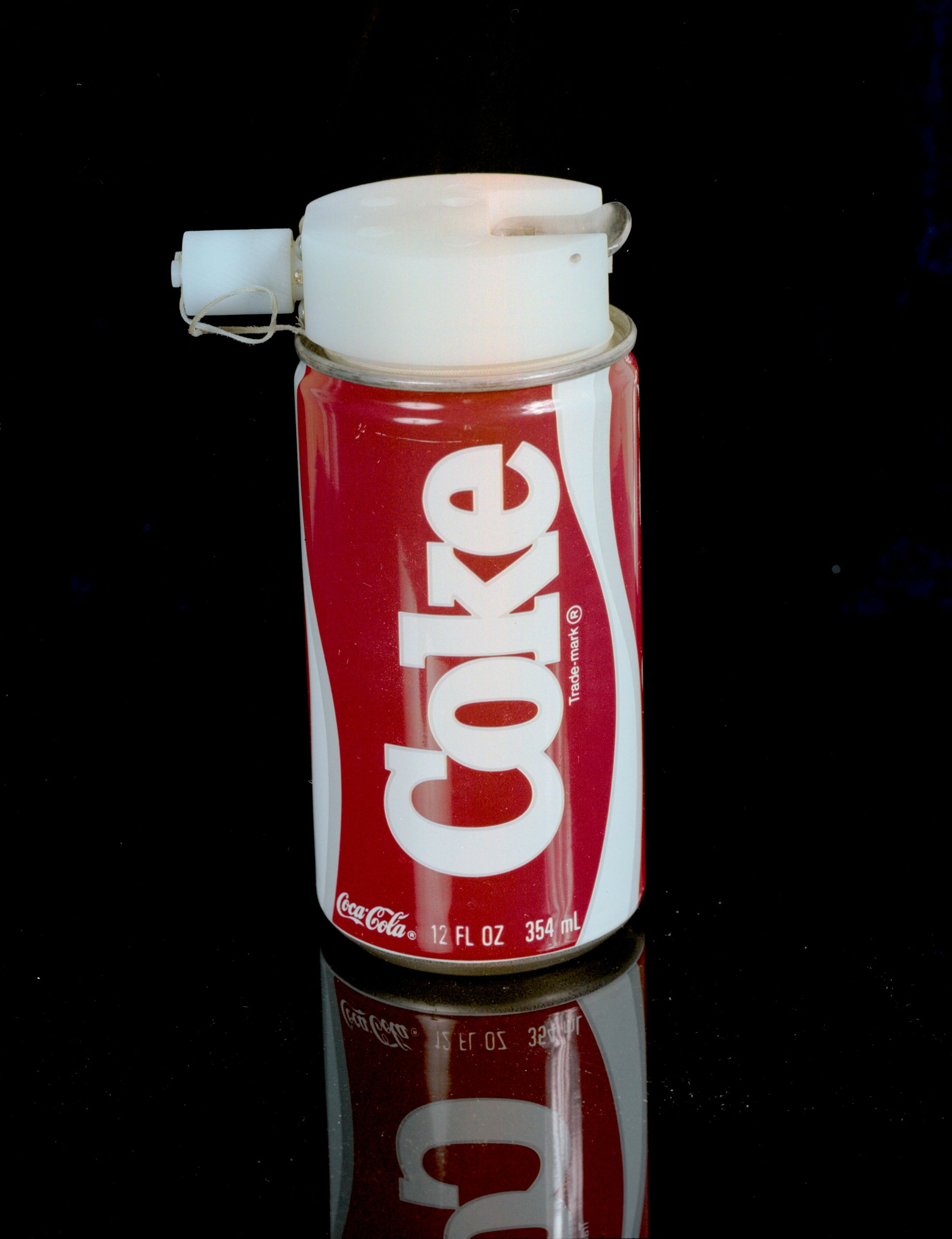
Coca-Cola can designed for STS-51-F

In the Space Cola Wars, the major soft drink competitors Coca-Cola and Pepsi engaged in costly marketing campaigns and product tests to get their beverages into space, in continuation of the so-called "Cola Wars". The competition began in 1985 during the STS-51-F Space Shuttle mission, when astronauts tested specially designed soda cans from each company to see how the carbonated drinks would perform in microgravity. In a widely publicized experiment, Coca-Cola's sophisticated fluid dispenser performed better than Pepsi's modified shaving cream can in dispensing drinkable soda.

Over the next decade, Coca-Cola continued developing enhanced space-rated soda dispensers that flew on subsequent shuttle missions to further study the effects of carbonation and taste perception in weightlessness. In 1996, Pepsi paid $300 million to create the first TV advertisement filmed in space aboard the Russian Mir space station.

== 1985: STS-51-F ==
In 1984, Coca-Cola proposed to "improve drinks on the shuttle" with a specially designed can for microgravity. NASA was not against the plan, and Coca-Cola president Brian Dyson announced it on a press conference, drawing attention from PepsiCo. Pepsi's Max Friedersdorf wrote a letter to NASA administrator, demanding "a chance to compete with Coca-Cola to supply carbonated refreshment to orbiting astronauts", and turned the competition into politics, writing:

You should be further advised that PepsiCo Inc. is strongly identified with the Republican Party and the support of President Reagan and his administration. At the same time, Coca-Cola was a very strong supporter and advocate of President Carter and is closely identified with the Democratic Party.

After the letter, NASA terminated the project, but in a few months contacted the Coca-Cola again to restart it. Few months before launch, NASA's lawyers noted that "the officials in Houston had not followed the correct procedures for flying the containers or notifying the company’s competitors". Eventually, NASA signed identical agreements with both companies.

In a heavily publicized marketing experiment, astronauts aboard STS-51-F drank carbonated beverages from specially designed cans from Cola Wars competitors Coca-Cola and Pepsi. According to astronaut Loren W. Acton, after Coke developed its experimental dispenser for an earlier shuttle flight, Pepsi insisted that Coke should not be the first cola in space, and contacted the White House through their contacts. The experiment was delayed until Pepsi could develop its own system, and the two companies' products were assigned to STS-51-F.

...the Coke can had had a lot of work put into it, and was designed to dispense a beverage without stirring up the liquid. The Pepsi can, when it showed up, looked like a shaving cream can. In fact, the Pepsi logo was just stuck on a paper wrapper, and when we peeled it off, indeed it was just a shaving cream can. It still had the shaving cream logo on it. Pepsi understood that this had nothing whatsoever to do with soda in space. It had to do with PR.

There were four cans of each Coca-Cola and Pepsi on board. Pepsi's cans had a slogan "One giant sip for mankind" on it. Red Team tested Coke, and Blue Team tested Pepsi. As part of the experiment, each team was photographed with the cola logo. Acton said that while the sophisticated Coke system "dispensed soda kind of like what we're used to drinking on Earth", the Pepsi's shaving cream can "dispensed soda filled with bubbles" that was "not very drinkable". Acton said that "this stupid thing was taking more time than our serious experiments"; when he gives speeches in schools, audiences are much more interested in hearing about the cola experiment than in solar physics.

According to Pepsi, they spent 14 million dollars on their design, while Coca-Cola's dispenser costed $250,000. NASA considered these dispensers an "engineering demonstration", but for both companies it was a PR action. Coca-Cola claimed a win in the "Space Cola Wars" stating that it is "the first soft drink tasted in space".

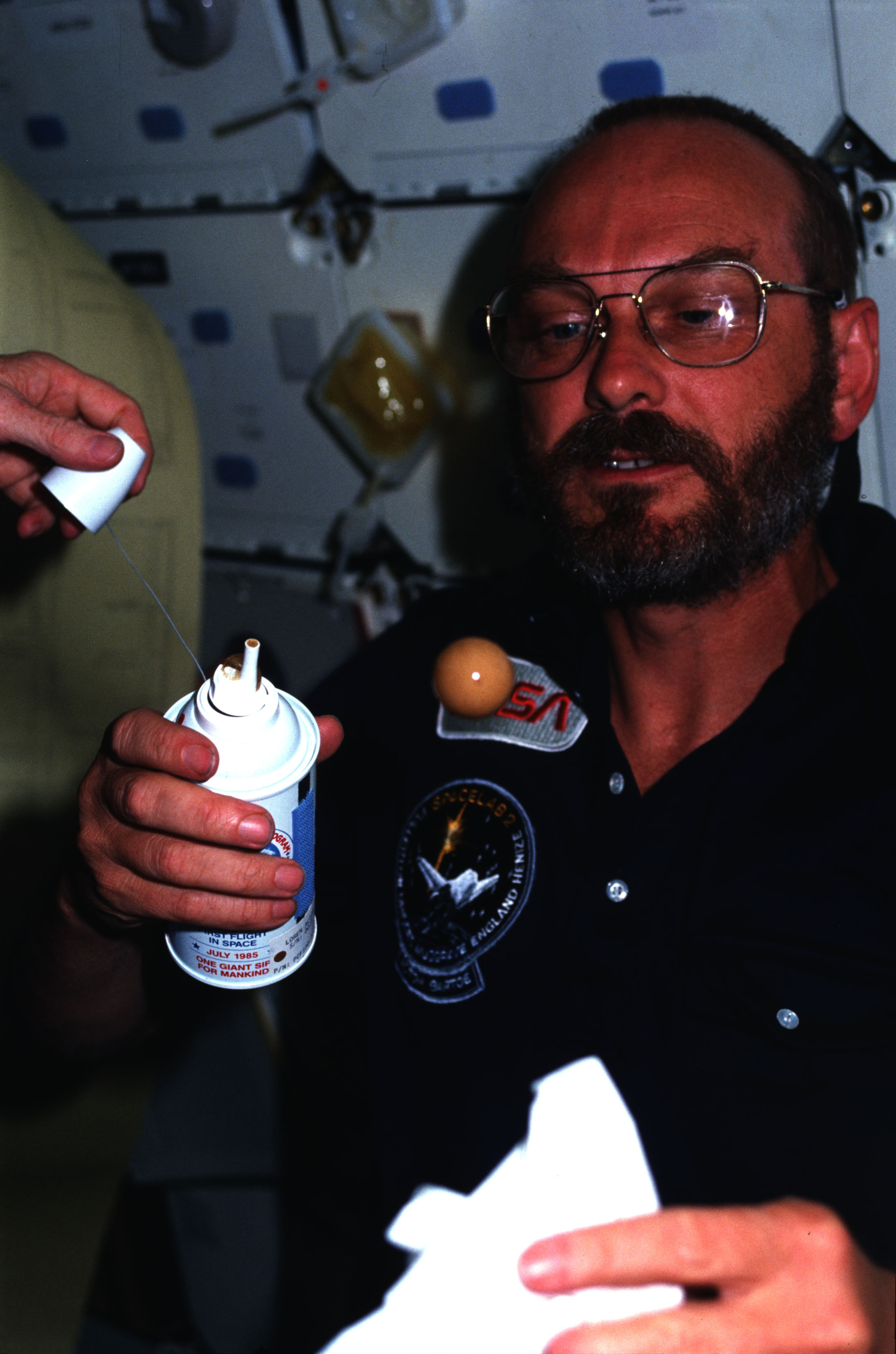
Loren W. Acton with Pepsi can

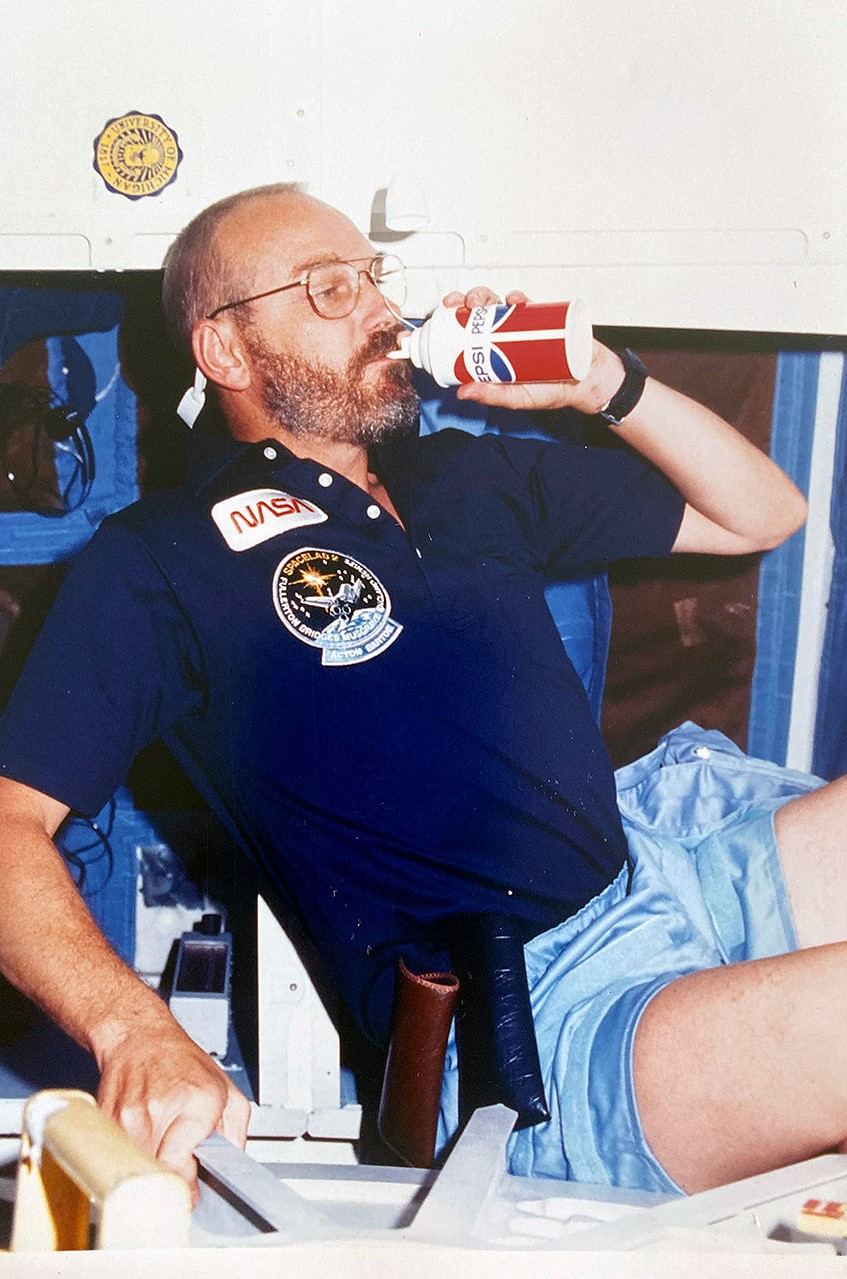
STS-51F payload specialist Loren Acton evaluates a Pepsi space soda

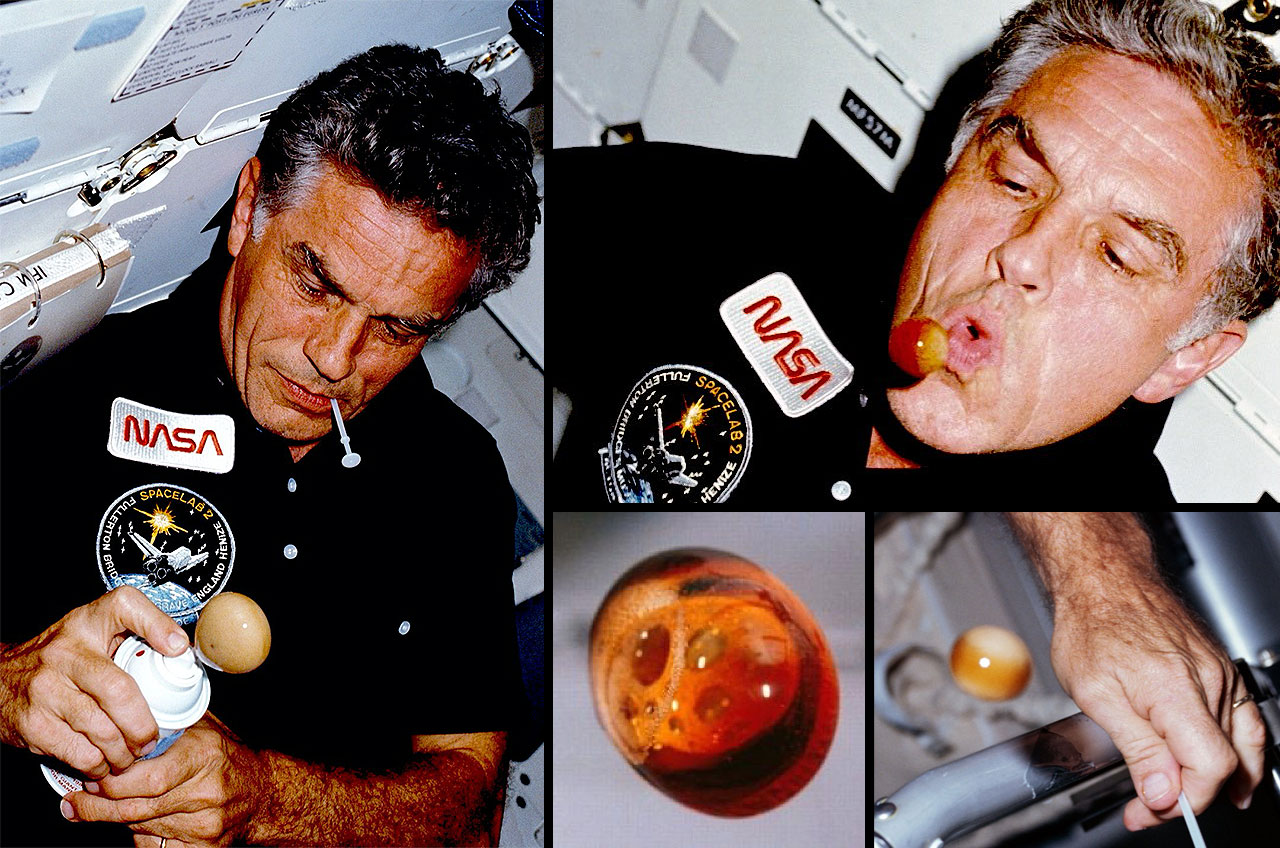
Karl Henize, STS-51F mission specialist, creates frothy, fizzing Pepsi soda balls during the Carbonated Beverage Dispenser Evaluation

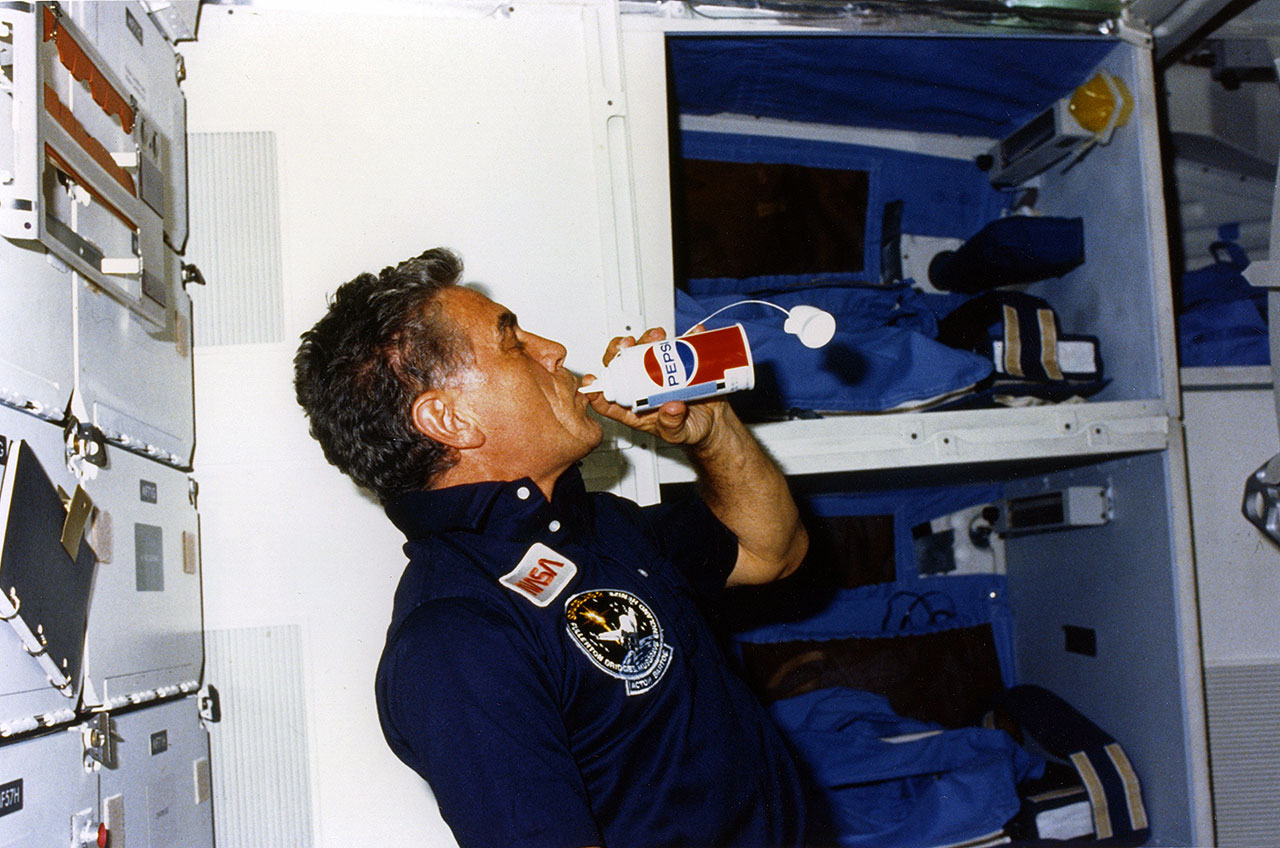
Karl Henize, STS-51F mission specialist, drinks from a Pepsi can

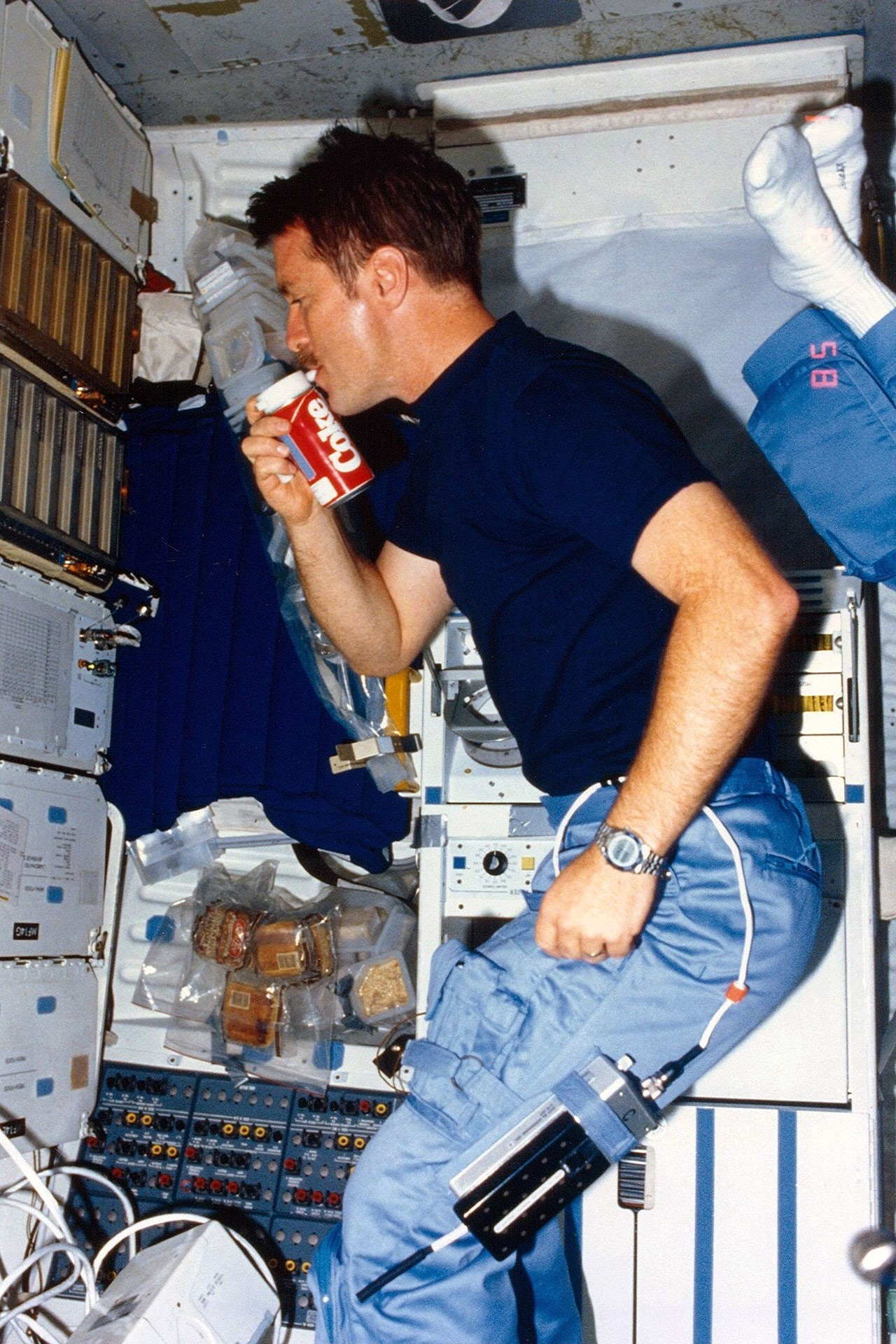
Tony England drinks Coca-Cola in space

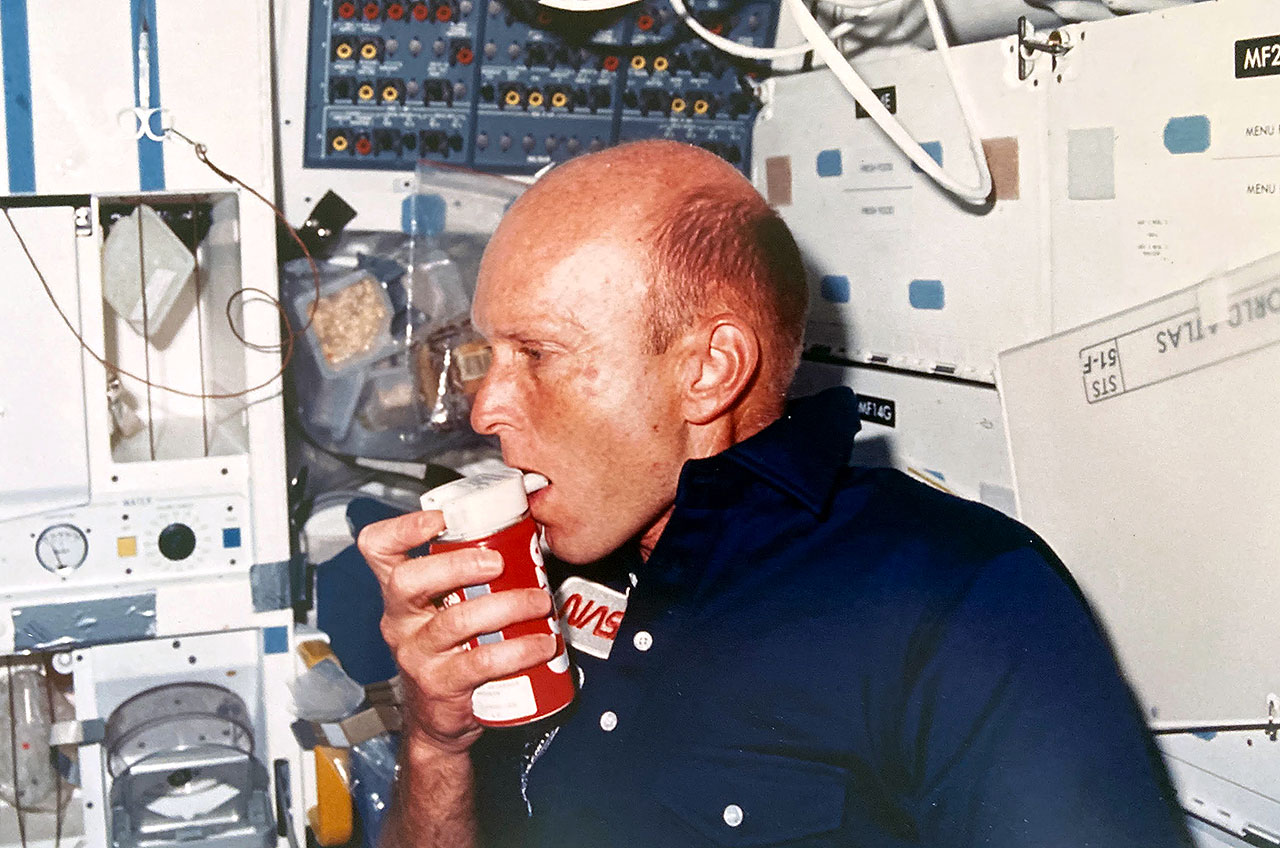
Gordon Fullerton, STS-51F mission commander, with a Coca-Cola can

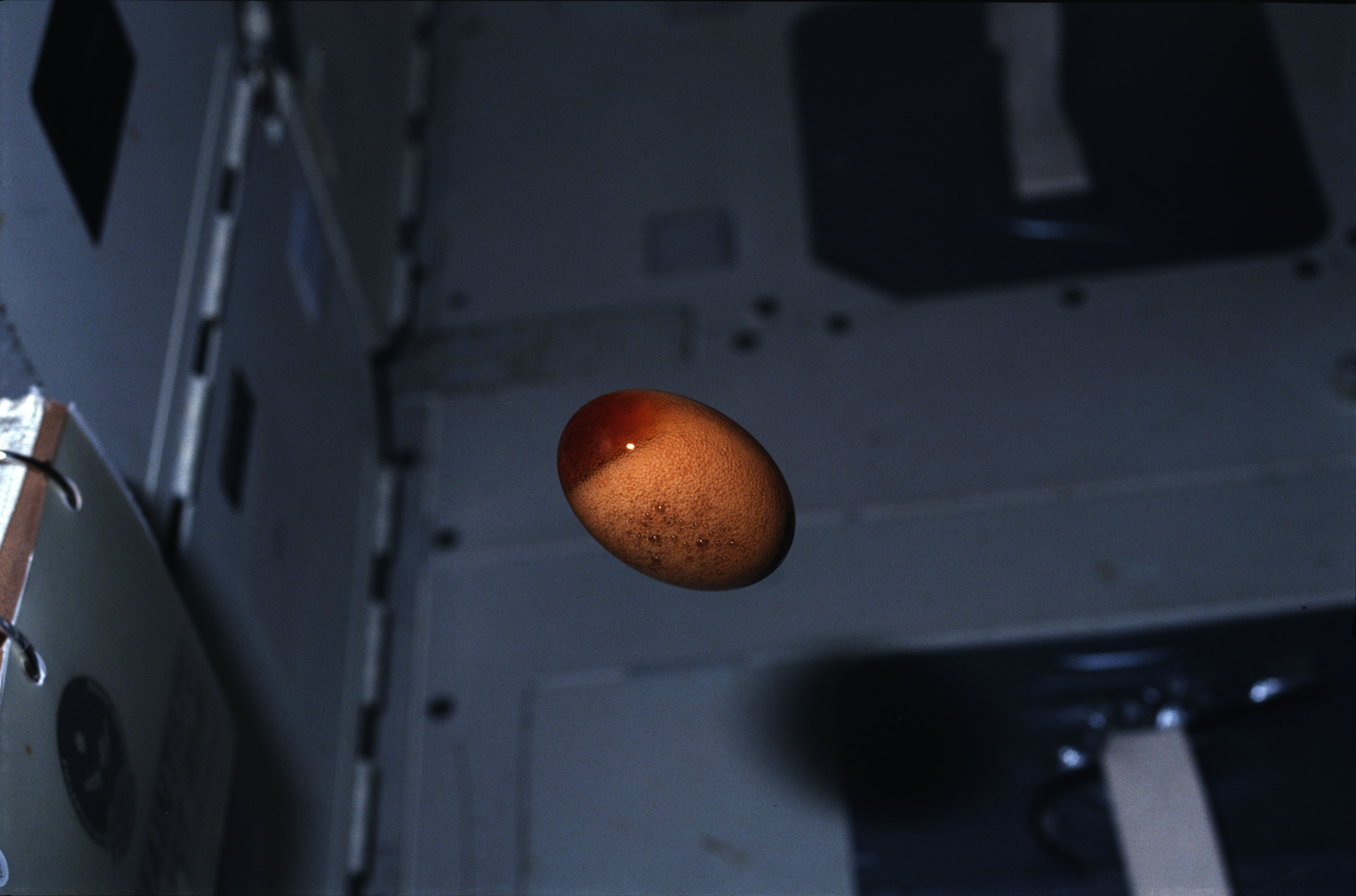
A floating ball of cola

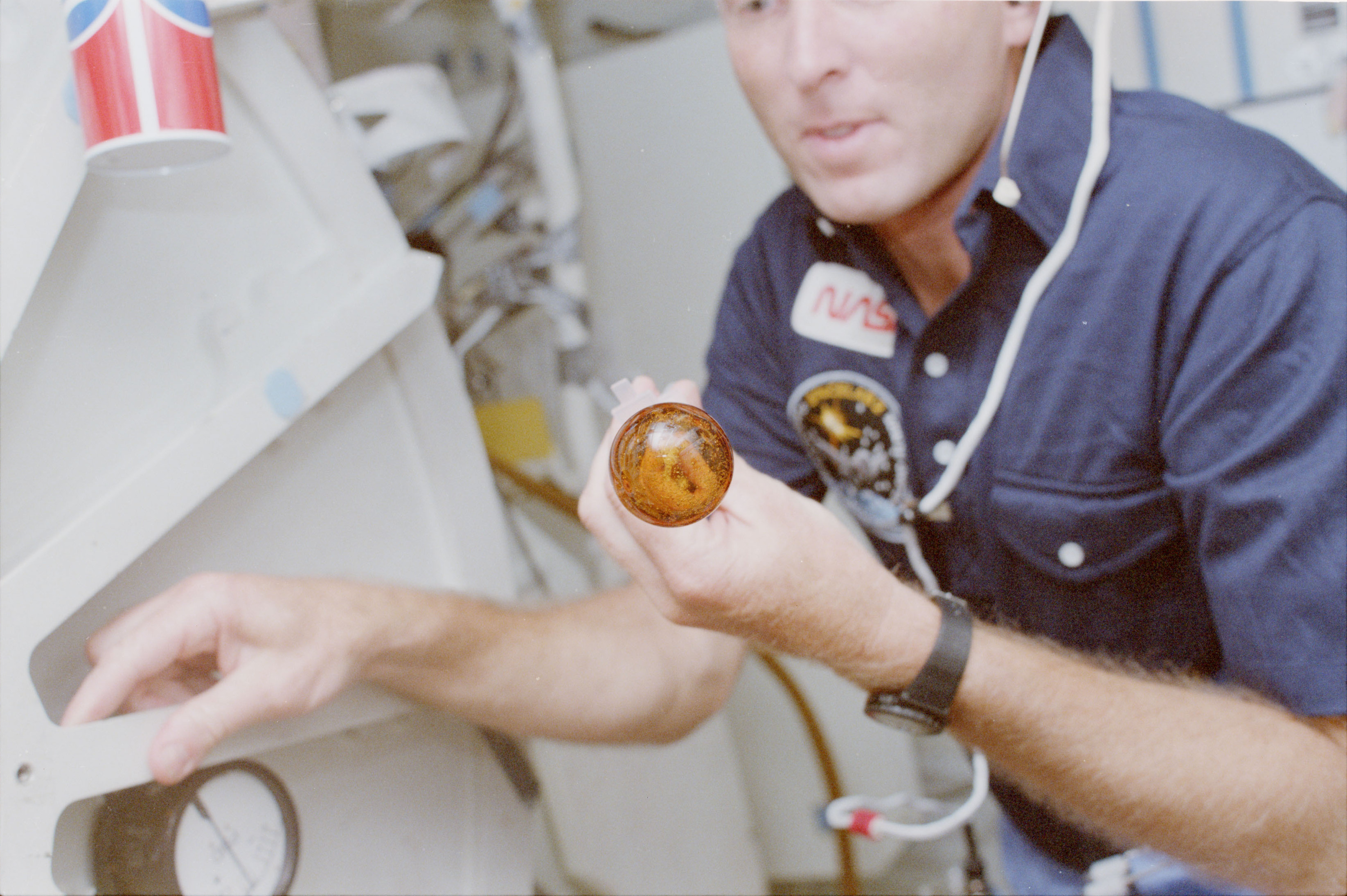
F. Story Musgrave with liquid Pepsi drop in front of him.

== Fluids Generic Bioprocessing Apparatus ==
=== 1995: FGBA-1 on STS-63 ===
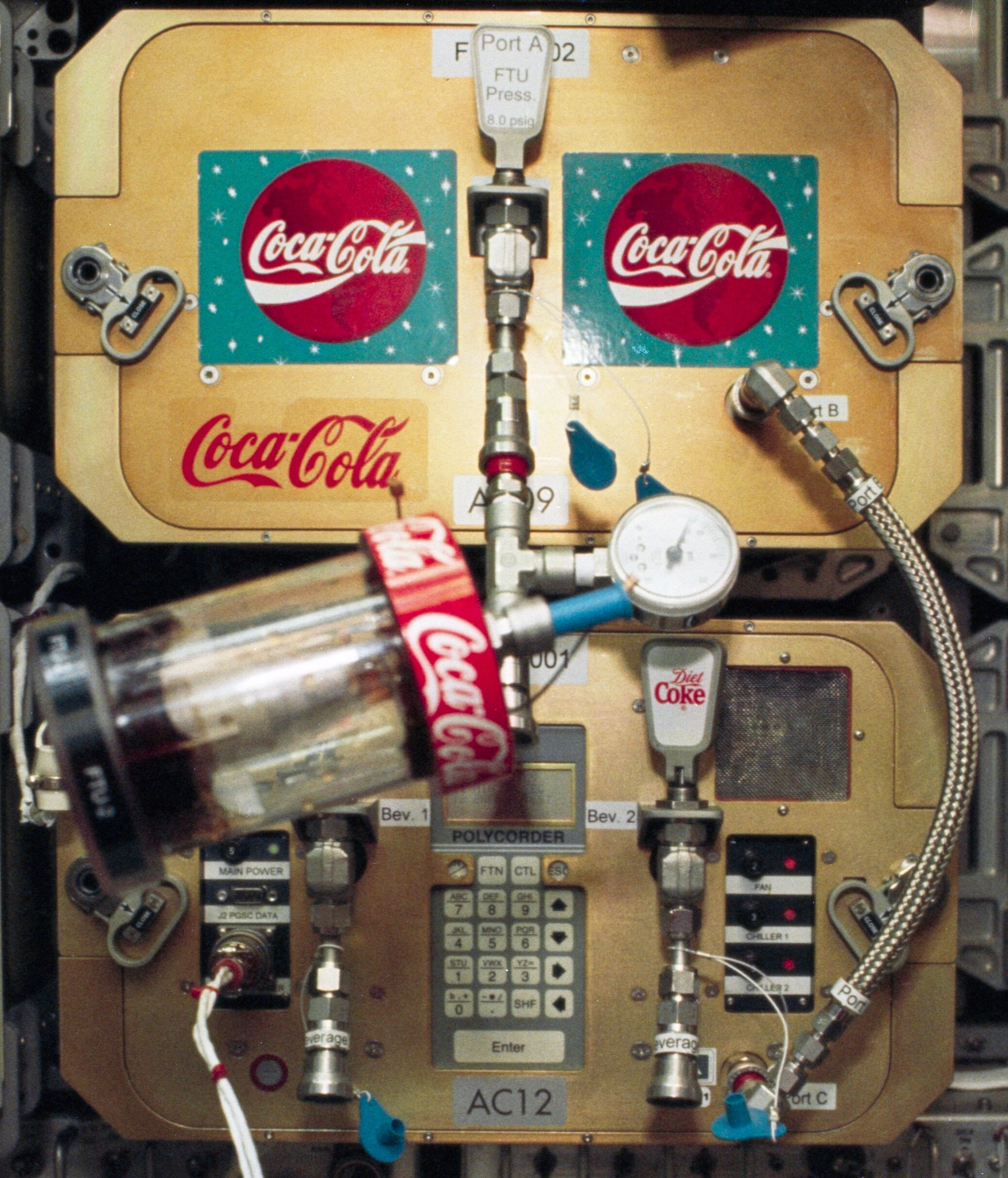
Fluids Generic Bioprocessing Apparatus on STS-63

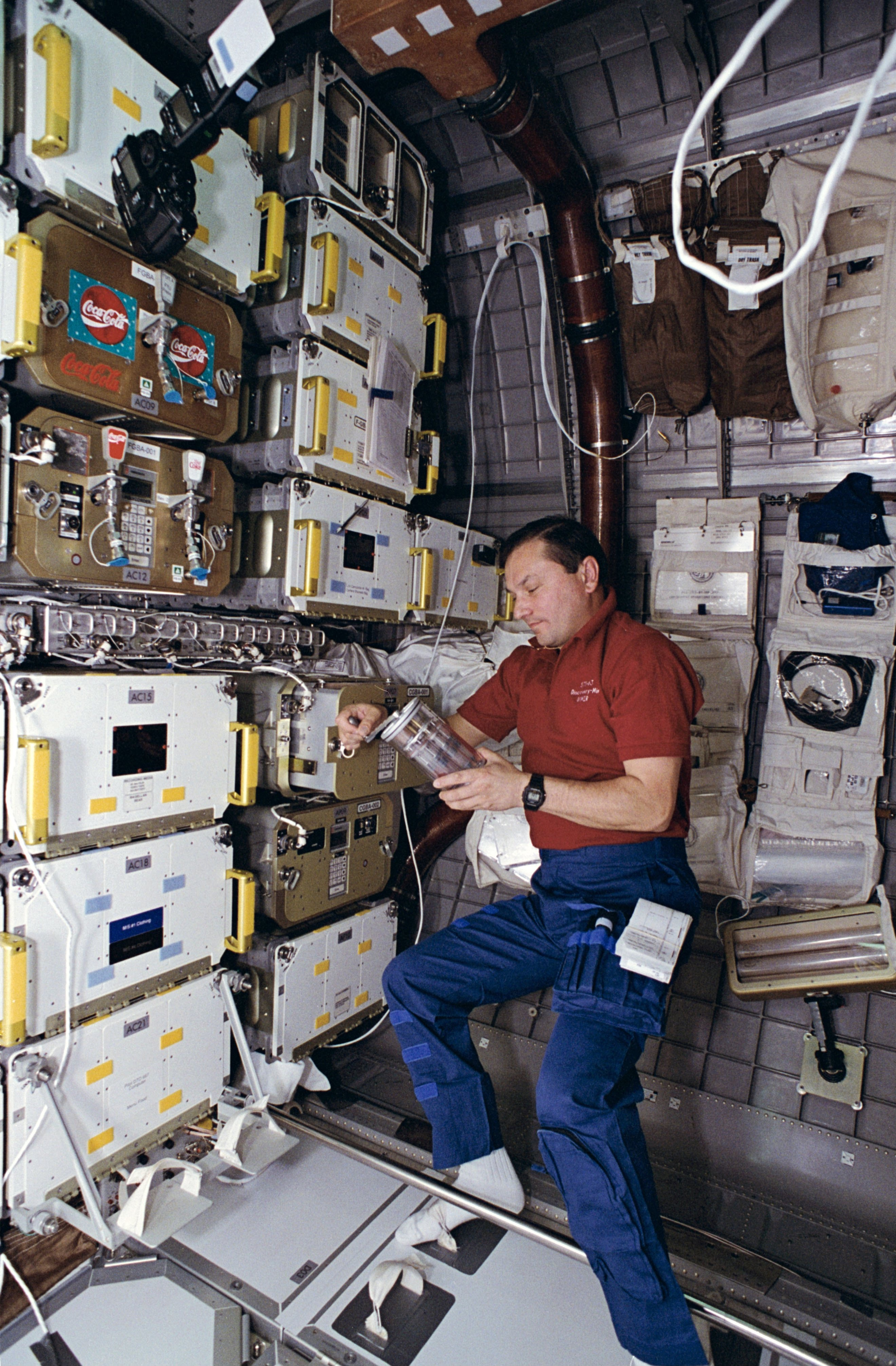
Russian cosmonaut Vladimir Titov works with samples for the CGBA

BioServe Space Technologies at the University of Colorado, Boulder, developed the Fluids Generic Bioprocessing Apparatus-1 (FGBA-1) in cooperation with Coca-Cola. It dispensed pre-mixed soda for astronauts' consumption and studied their changed taste perceptions. Astronauts rated control samples before and after flight. According to the University of Colorado Boulder, "FGBA served a very pertinent role in validating engineering techniques for the containment, manipulation, and transfer of supersaturated two-phase fluids in microgravity which was a relatively uncharacterized problem at the time and is a significant challenge outside of just carbonated beverages". FGBA also had an "integral heart rate monitor to track astronauts' physiological reactions". FGBA-1 flew on STS-63 in 1995 and dispensed pre-mixed beverages.

=== 1996: FGBA-2 on STS-77 ===
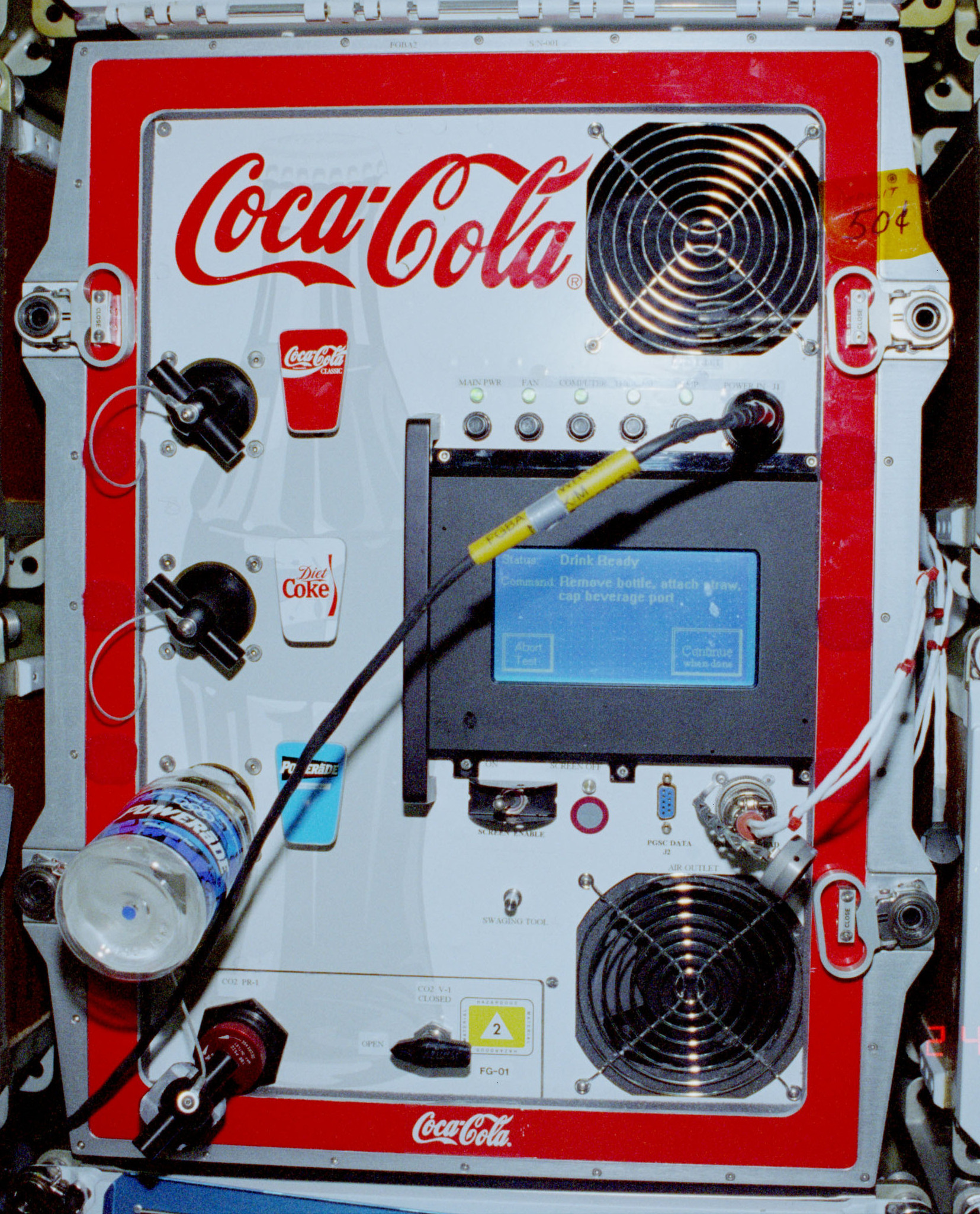
Fluids Generic Bioprocessing Apparatus 2 on STS-77

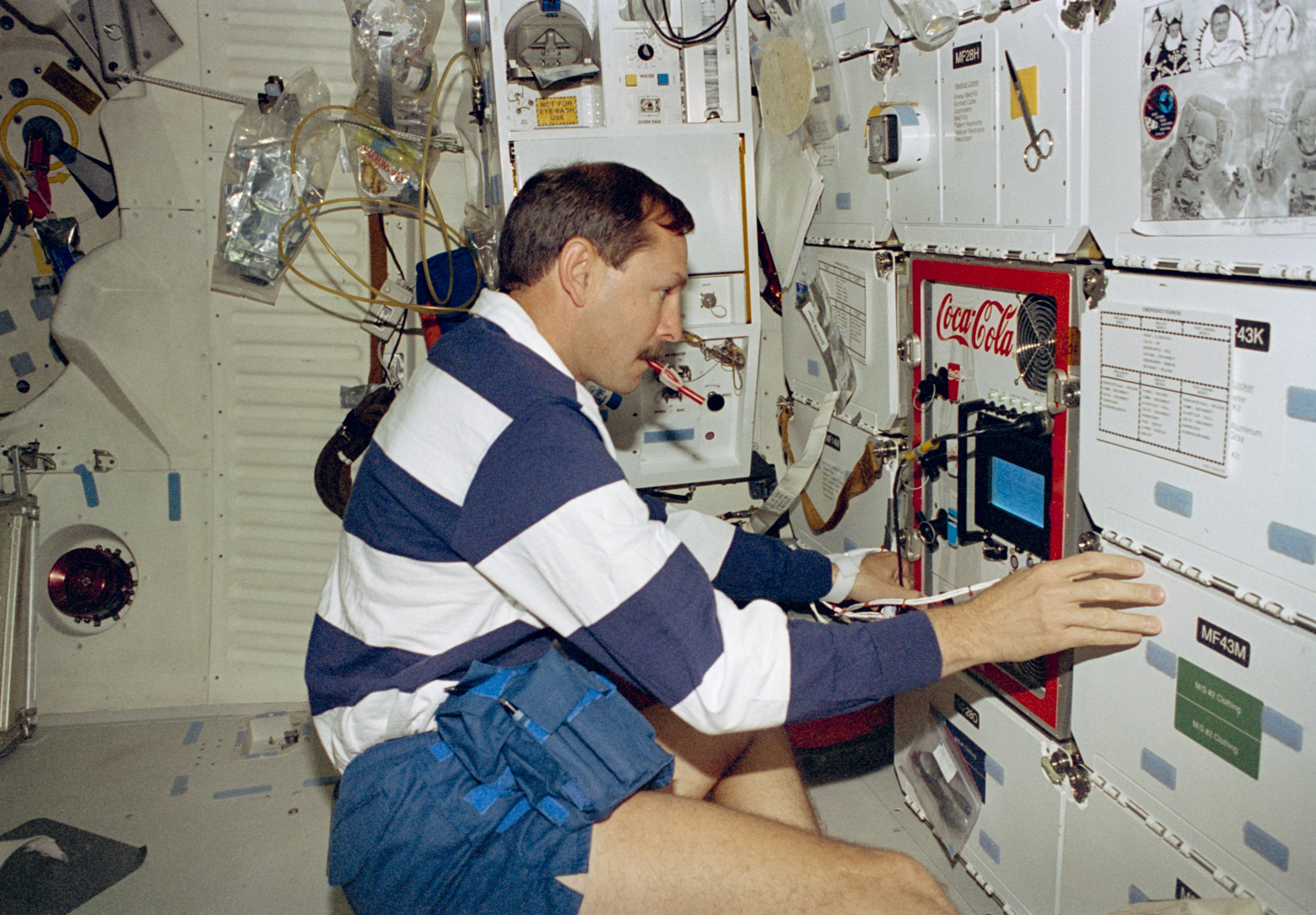
Pilot Curtis Brown prepares to activate FGBA-2, on the middeck

FGBA-2 was developed for use on STS-77 as a test bed to determine if carbonated beverages can be produced from separately stored carbon dioxide, water and flavored syrups and determine if the resulting fluids can be made available for consumption without bubble nucleation and resulting foam formation. The unit held 1.65 liters (0.36 imp gal; 0.44 U.S. gal) each of Coca-Cola, Diet Coke and Powerade.

== Pepsi Mir advertisement ==
In 1996, Pepsi paid US$300,000,000 (equivalent to $616,000,000 in 2025) to shoot the "first ad shot in space". Russian cosmonauts Yuri Onufrienko and Yuri Usachev filmed a video on the Mir Space Station during a space walk, while American astronaut Shannon Lucid assisted them from the station, "keeping an eye on their life support systems and filming the ad". Cosmonauts filmed "a four-foot-tall replica" of "Pepsi’s new blue can design".
