= Karl Gordon Henize =

American astronomer and astronaut (1926–1993)

Karl Henize
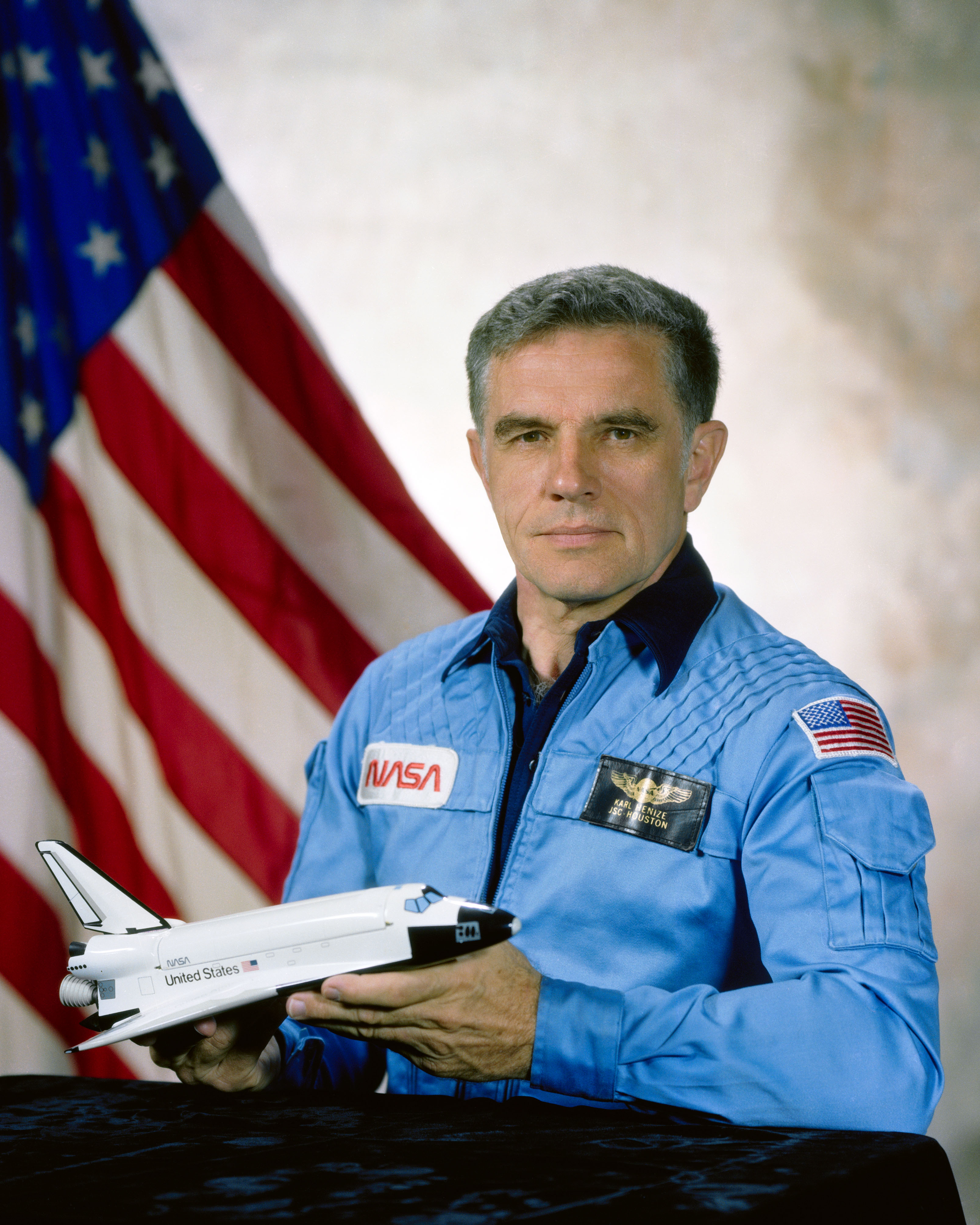
- Born: Karl Gordon Henize; October 17, 1926; Cincinnati, Ohio, U.S.
- Died: October 5, 1993 (aged 66); Mount Everest, Nepal
- Education: University of Virginia (BA, MA); University of Michigan (PhD)
- Space career

NASA astronaut
- Rank: Lieutenant Commander, USNR
- Time in space: 7d 22h 45min
- Selection: NASA Group 6 (1967)
- Mission: STS-51-F
- Retired: April 1986
- Scientific career
- Fields: Astronomy
- Thesis: The Michigan-Mount Wilson Survey of the Southern Sky for Hα-Emission Stars and Nebulae (1954)

Karl Gordon Henize (/ˈhɛnaɪz/; October 17, 1926 – October 5, 1993) was an American astronomer, space scientist, NASA astronaut, and professor at Northwestern University. He was stationed at several observatories around the world, including McCormick Observatory, Lamont–Hussey Observatory (South Africa), Mount Wilson Observatory, Smithsonian Astrophysical Observatory and Mount Stromlo Observatory (Australia). He was a member of the astronaut support crew for Apollo 15 and Skylab 2, 3, and 4. As a mission specialist on the Spacelab-2 mission (STS-51-F), he flew on Space Shuttle Challenger in July/August 1985. He was awarded the NASA Exceptional Scientific Achievement Medal in 1974.

He died in 1993, during a Mount Everest expedition while testing equipment for NASA.

== Early life and education ==
Karl Henize was born in Cincinnati, Ohio, on October 17, 1926. He grew up on a small dairy farm outside Cincinnati, and his boyhood heroes were Buck Rogers and Sir Edmund Hillary, the first man to reach the summit of Mount Everest. Henize was fascinated with space at a young age. Since space travel had not happened yet during his childhood, he became interested in astronomy. Henize built his own telescopes and read every book on astronomy in his school's library. He joined the Boy Scouts, and his only merit badge was in astronomy.

His hobbies included home computers, stamp collecting, mathematics, and astronomy, and he also enjoyed racquetball, baseball, skin diving, and mountain climbing.

Henize attended elementary school in Plainville and Mariemont, Ohio. The school was small, three or four rooms, and did not contain a library. He also attended high school in Mariemont, where he played baseball and was on the tumbling team. Due to the war, Karl elected to not finish high school, instead entering the V-12 Navy College Training Program, which first took him to Denison University in Granville, Ohio, and then to the University of Virginia. World War II ended before he received his Naval Commission, so he became a member of the U.S. Naval Reserve, reaching the rank of lieutenant commander and retained a draft status of A1 until being required to give that up when he became an astronaut in 1967. While at the University of Virginia, he received a Bachelor of Arts degree in mathematics in 1947, and a Master of Arts degree in astronomy in 1948, while also carrying out research at McCormick Observatory. He was awarded a Doctor of Philosophy in astronomy in 1954 by the University of Michigan.

Henize married Caroline née Weber in Ann Arbor, and they had four children: Kurt, Marcia, Skye, and Vance.

== Experience ==
Henize was an observer for the University of Michigan Observatory from 1948 to 1951, stationed at the Lamont–Hussey Observatory in Bloemfontein, Union of South Africa. While there, he conducted an objective-prism spectroscopic survey of the southern sky for stars and nebulae showing emission lines of hydrogen.

In 1954 he became a Carnegie post-doctoral fellow at the Mount Wilson Observatory in Pasadena, California, and conducted spectroscopic and photometric studies of emission-line stars and nebulae. From 1956 to 1959, he served as a senior astronomer at the Smithsonian Astrophysical Observatory. He was in charge of photographic satellite tracking stations for the satellite tracking program and responsible for the establishment and operation of a global network of 12 stations for photographic tracking of artificial Earth satellites.

Henize was appointed associate professor in Northwestern University's Department of Astronomy in 1959 and was awarded a professorship in 1964. In addition to teaching, he conducted research on planetary nebulae, peculiar emission-line stars, S-type stars, and T-associations. During 1961 and 1962, he was a guest observer at Mount Stromlo Observatory in Canberra, Australia, where he used instruments ranging from the Uppsala 20/26-inch schmidt to the 74-inch parabolic reflector.

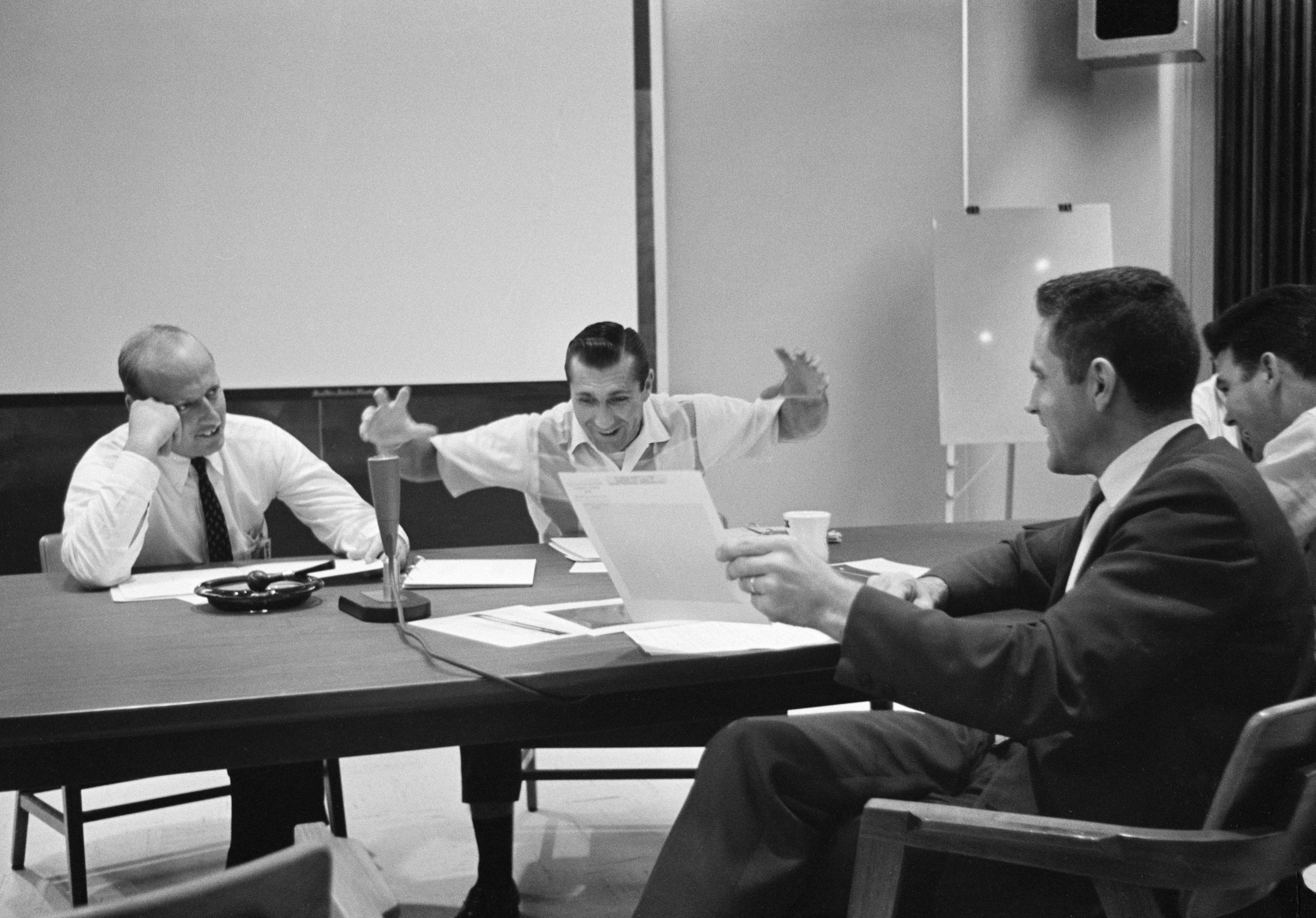
Henize, then an employee at Dearborn Observatory, discussing the Ultraviolet Astronomical Camera Experiment with the Gemini 11 astronauts (1966)

Henize also engaged in studies of ultraviolet optical systems and astronomical programs suited to the crewed space flight program. He became principal investigator of experiment S-013 which obtained ultraviolet stellar spectra during the Gemini 10, 11, and 12 flights. He also became principal investigator of experiment S-019 in which a 6-inch aperture objective-prism spectrograph was used on Skylab to obtain ultraviolet spectra of faint stars.

From 1974 to 1978 Henize chaired the NASA Facility Definition Team for STARLAB, a proposed 1-meter UV telescope for Spacelab. From 1978 to 1980 he chaired the NASA Working Group for the Spacelab Wide-Angle Telescope. Since 1979 he had been the chairman of the International Astronomical Union Working Group for Space Schmidt Surveys and was one of the leaders in proposing the use of a 1-meter (3 ft) all-reflecting Schmidt telescope to carry out a deep full-sky survey in far-ultraviolet wavelengths.

He authored or co-authored 70 scientific publications dealing with astronomy research.

== NASA experience ==
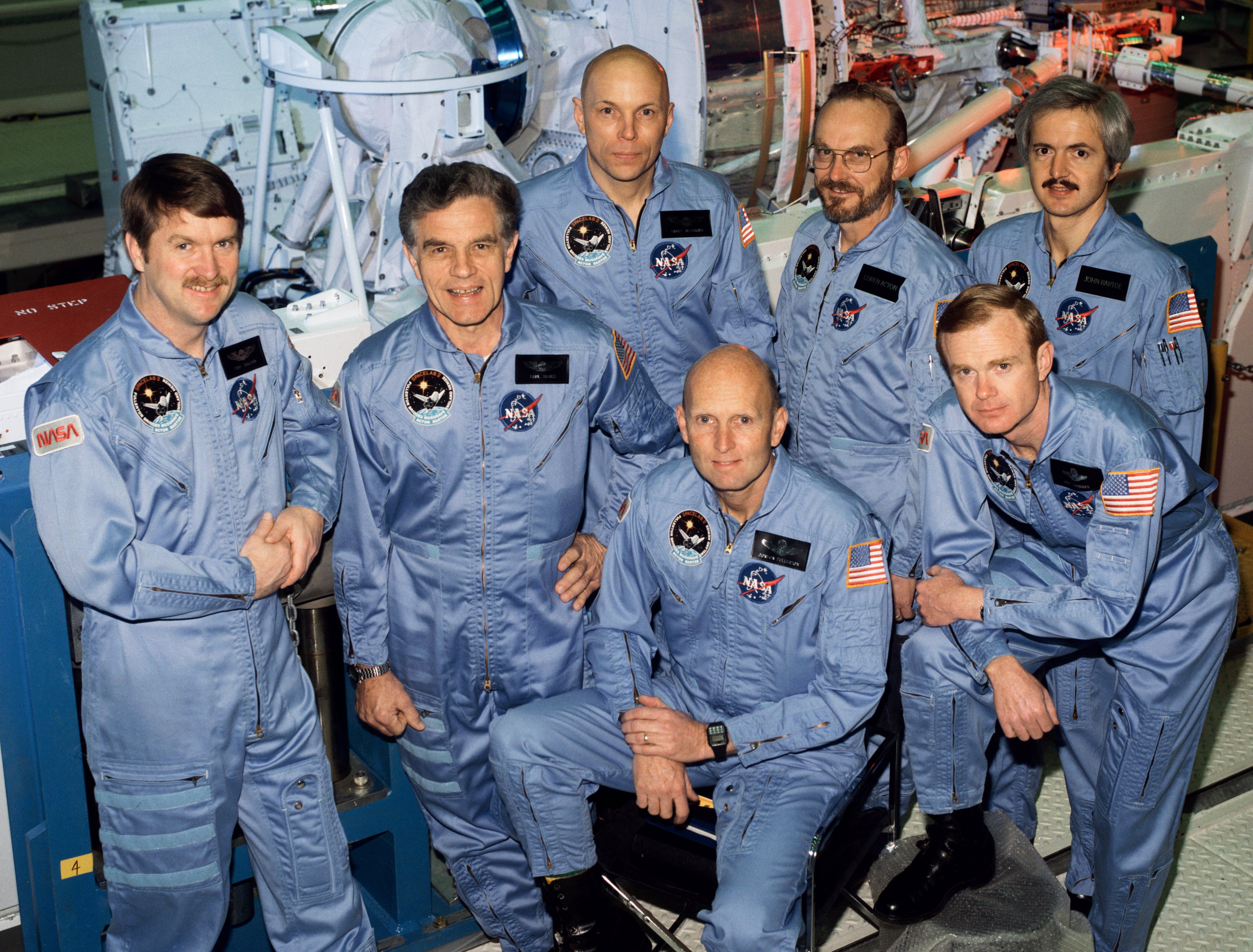
The crew assigned to the STS-51F mission (1985)

Henize applied for the first scientist-astronaut group, but was denied because the age limit was 35 and he was 37. In 1967, NASA abolished the age limit, and Henize was selected as a scientist-astronaut by NASA in August. Astronauts that did not already know how to fly had to complete a 53-week jet pilot training program at Vance Air Force Base, Oklahoma. They also completed initial education there. He was a member of the astronaut support crew and CAPCOM for the Apollo 15 mission. The entire support crew consisted of scientist-astronauts, as the prime crew of the mission thought they would need more help with the science aspects of the mission rather than the piloting. He was also a member of the astronaut support crew for the Skylab 2, 3, and 4 missions. He was mission specialist for the ASSESS-2 spacelab simulation mission in 1977. He logged 2,300 hours flying time in jet aircraft.

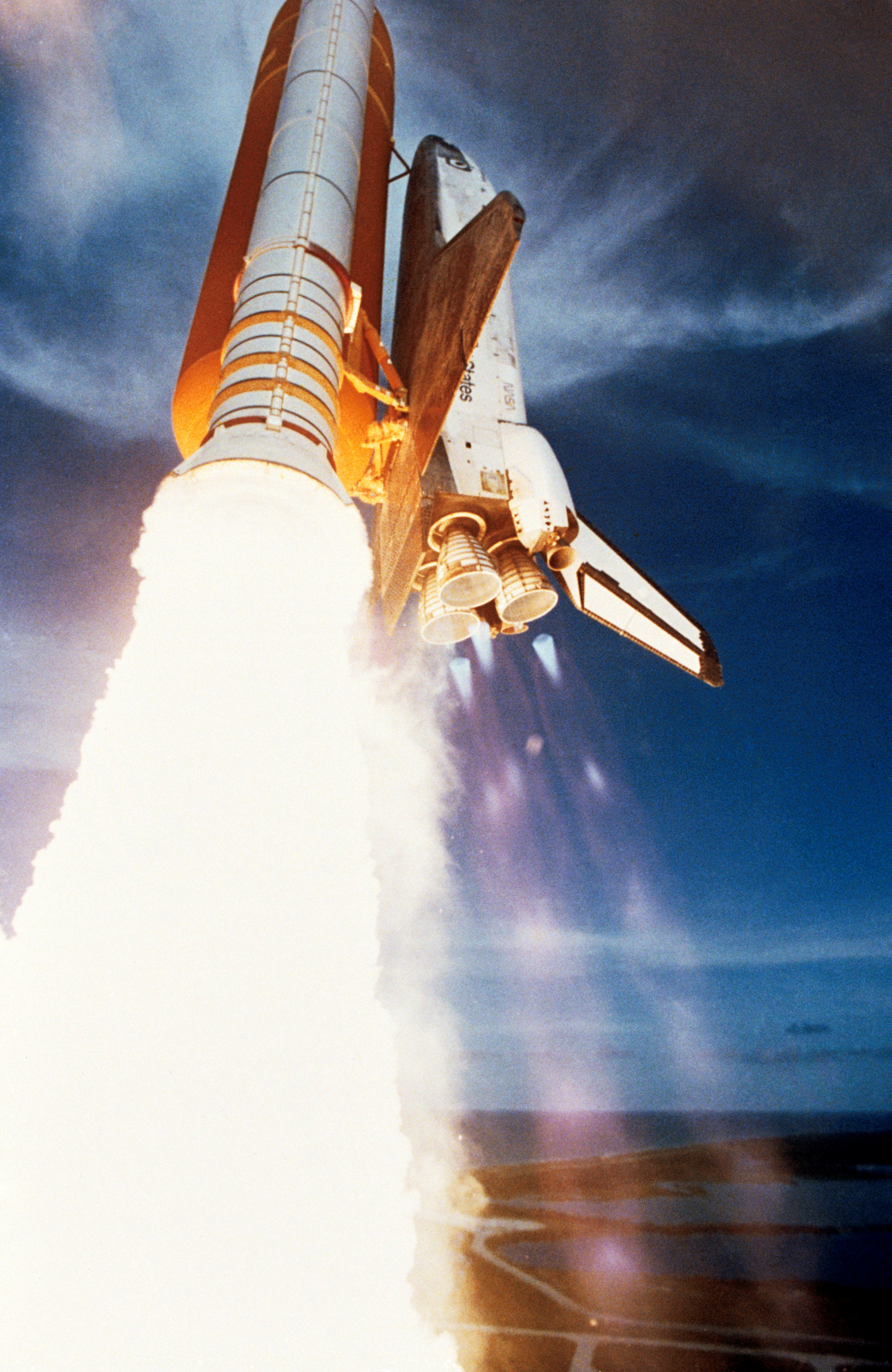
Liftoff on July 29, 1985, sending Henize into Earth orbit

Henize was a mission specialist on the Spacelab-2 mission (STS-51-F) which launched from Kennedy Space Center, Florida, on July 29, 1985. He was accompanied by Col. Gordon Fullerton (spacecraft commander), Col. Roy D. Bridges (pilot), fellow mission specialists Dr. Anthony W. England and Dr. F. Story Musgrave, as well as two payload specialists, Dr. Loren Acton and Dr. John-David Bartoe.

This mission was the first pallet-only Spacelab mission and the first mission to operate the Spacelab Instrument Pointing System (IPS). It carried 13 major experiments, of which seven were in the field of astronomy and solar physics, three were for studies of the Earth's ionosphere, two were life science experiments, and one studied the properties of superfluid helium. Henize's responsibilities included testing and operating the IPS, operating the Remote Manipulator System (RMS), maintaining the Spacelab systems, and operating several of the experiments.

After 126 orbits of the Earth, STS 51-F Challenger landed at Edwards Air Force Base, California, on August 6, 1985. With the completion of this flight Henize logged 190 hours in space.

In 1986, he retired as an astronaut and accepted a position as senior scientist in the Space Sciences Branch. He studied space debris and hazards to the space station.

In the 1998 miniseries From the Earth to the Moon, Henize was played by Marc Macaulay.

== Death ==
Henize, on leave from NASA at the time, went on a hiking expedition to Mount Everest with British research group High Adventure BVI. He intended to test the Tissue Equivalent Proportional Counter (TEPC) at different altitudes: 17,000 feet (5,200 m), 19,000 feet (5,800 m), and 21,000 feet (6,400 m). The TEPC would reveal how people's bodies would be affected, including the way bodily tissues behaved, when struck by radiation, which was important for the planning of long duration space missions. The data would be shared with NASA and BVI.

Henize acclimatized at Kathmandu, Nepal, followed by acclimatization at expedition base camp in China. With three members of High Adventure BVI, he began the hike on October 4, 1993. He reported breathing problems on their way to advanced base camp; they were at 22,000 feet (6,700 m). Treatments with oxygen failed, and they returned to base camp. On October 5, Henize died in his sleep. The cause of death was determined to be high altitude pulmonary edema (HAPE). He was buried near the Changtse Glacier. He was survived by his wife, Caroline, and four children.

== Organizations ==
Henize was a member of the American Astronomical Society; the Royal Astronomical Society; the Astronomical Society of the Pacific; the International Astronomical Union; and Phi Beta Kappa.

== Special honors ==
He was presented the Robert Gordon Memorial Award for 1968, and was a recipient of NASA Group Achievement Awards in 1971, 1974, 1975, 1978. He was also awarded the NASA Exceptional Scientific Achievement Medal in 1974.

== Writings ==
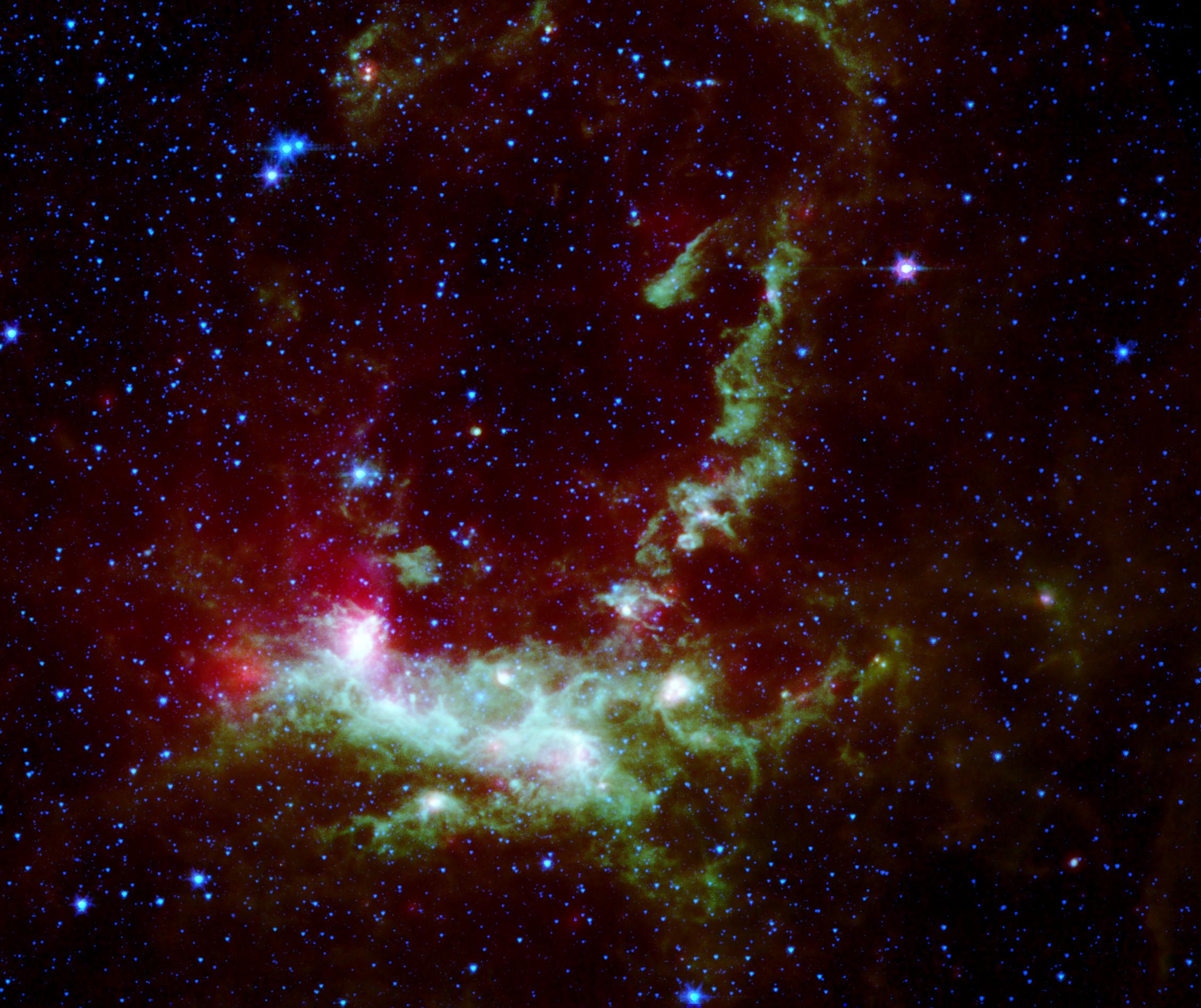
Henize 206, cataloged by Henize

In 1956, Henize published the Catalogues of Hα-Emission Stars and Nebulae in the Magellanic Clouds. The paper references many objects which bear his name, such as the Superbubble Henize 70 and the planetary nebula Henize 3–401. He discovered over 2,000 stars. In total, he published 75 papers.

== See also ==
- List of people who died climbing Mount Everest
