= Space advertising =

Use of advertisements in outer space

Space advertising is the practice of advertising in space. This is usually done with product placements during crewed space missions.

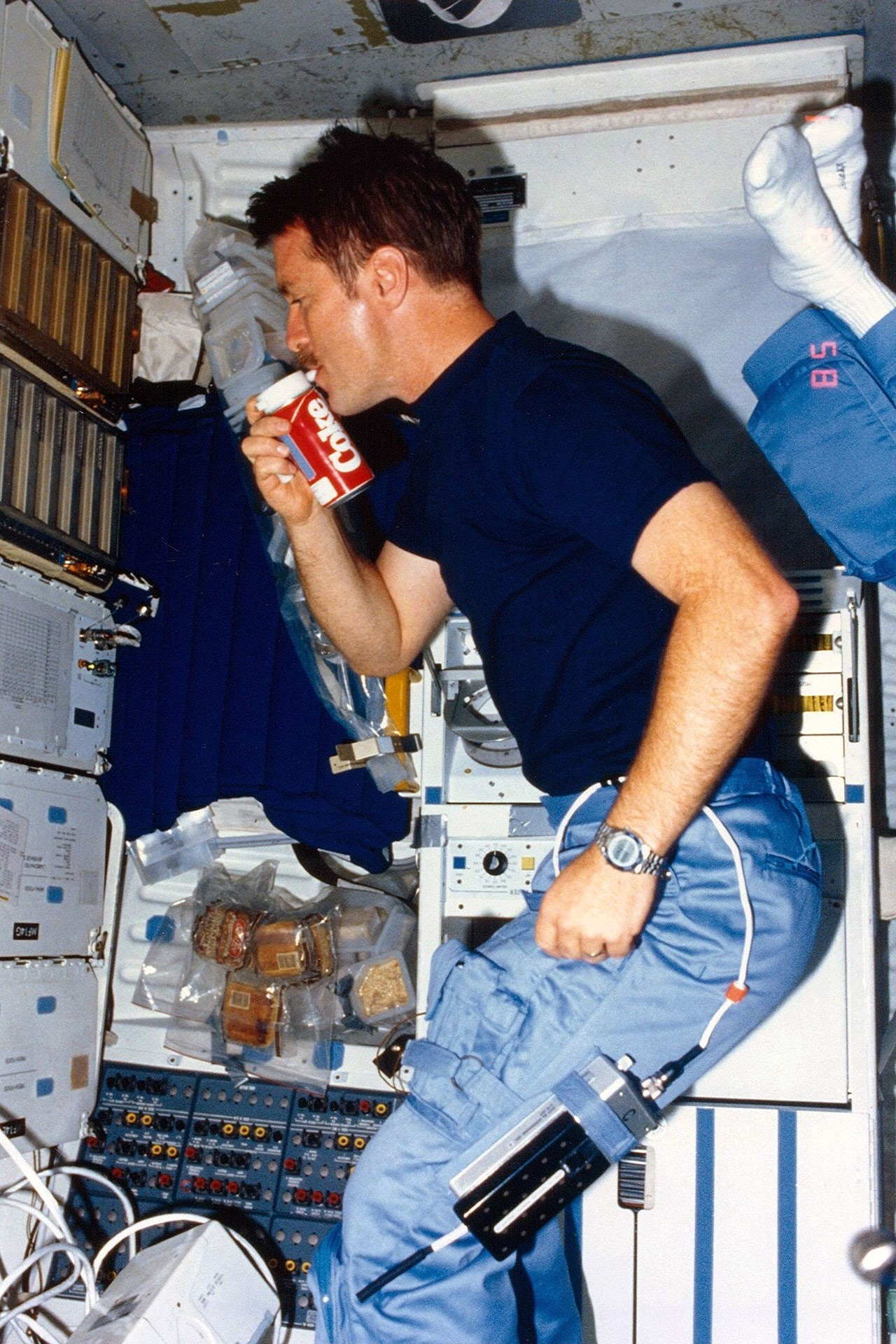
Astronaut Tony England drinking Coca-Cola from a special can designed for zero gravity during the Space Cola Wars.

Space advertising falls into two categories: obtrusive and non-obtrusive.

Obtrusive space advertising is advertising in outer space that is visible to individuals on the Earth's surface without the aid of a telescope or other technological devices. Both international and national laws govern the practice of obtrusive space advertising due to concerns about space debris (objects in space that can cause harm) and the potential obstruction of astronomical views from the Earth's surface. Contemporary regulations and technological capabilities limit space advertising, yet it persists in popular culture in a variety of forms.

Non-obtrusive space advertising is the term for any other type of advertisement in space, such as logos on space suits, satellites, and rockets.

== History ==
Since the Space Race and the dissolution of the Soviet Union, space-based advertising has been explored as a non-militarized use for space. Since then, several attempts at space advertising have occurred, such as Elon Musk’s SpaceX launch of a Tesla car into orbit.

One major advantage that space advertising has over other Earth-bound methods is the scale of its reach. Millions of people across multiple countries can be exposed to an advertisement orbiting Earth. However, relatively high start-up costs have prevented this from becoming a common mode of advertisement.

=== Attempts ===
In the past, attempts at orbital spaceflight have been discouraged due to the high cost (millions of USD per launch). Public space exploration authorities have also been reluctant to cater to advertisers. For example, NASA's restrictive policy on its employees' endorsing of products required astronauts to refer to M&M's as "candy-coated chocolates."

==== Successful attempts ====
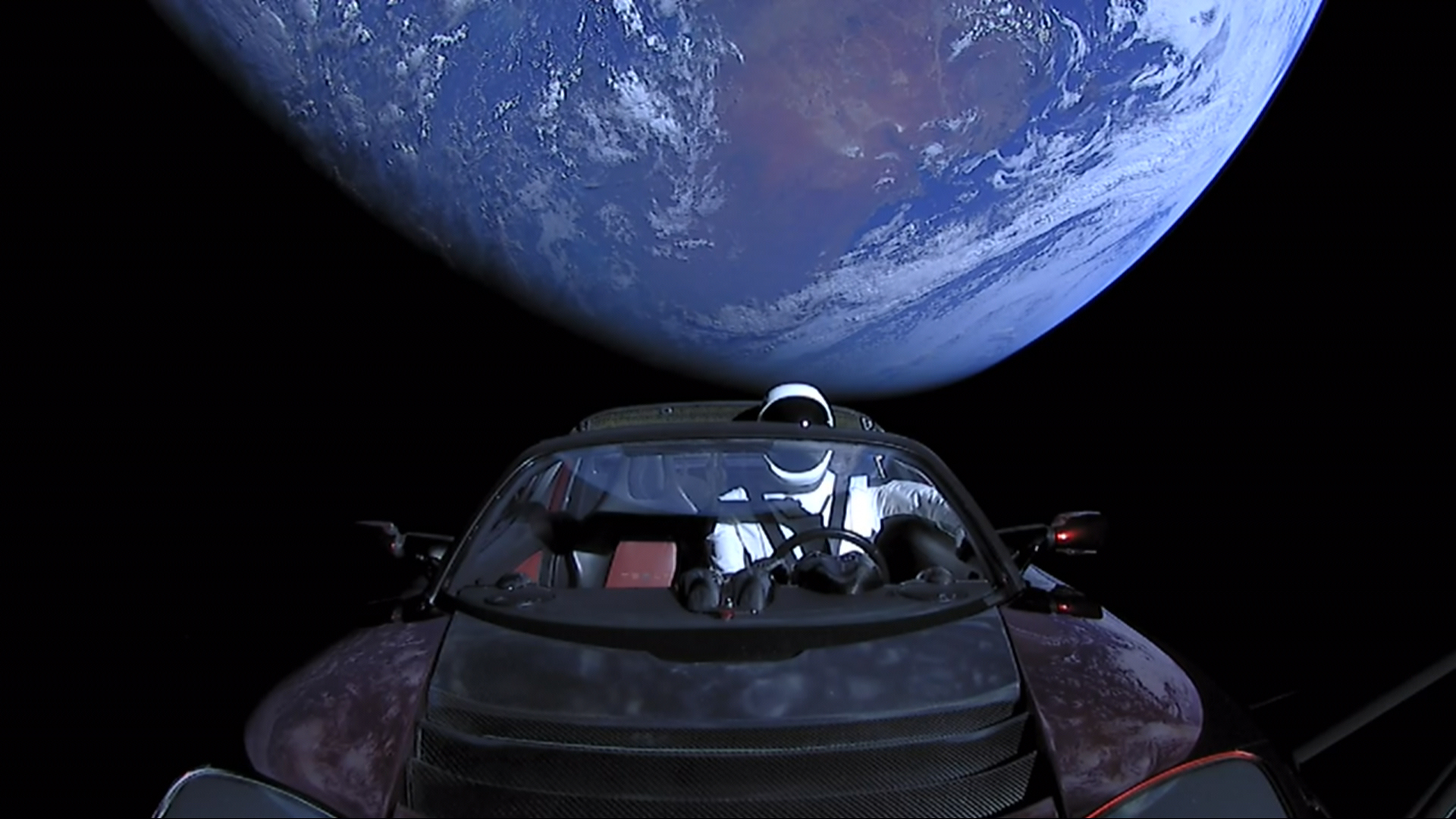
Elon Musk's Tesla Roadster is mounted on the Falcon Heavy upper-stage; Earth in the background.

Due to the high cost of orbital launches as well as associated maintenance costs, there have not been many successful advertising projects. For context, SpaceX's base fares for sending objects into space are highly costly, starting at $67 million.

Some successful attempts include the following:

- Tokyo Broadcasting System (1990): The Tokyo Broadcasting System (TBS) paid approximately $11 million to the Russian space agency for the flight of journalist Toyohiro Akiyama to the Russian space station Mir. The launch vehicle displayed the Tokyo Broadcasting System logo.
- Pepsi (1996): Pepsi paid approximately $5 million to have a cosmonaut float a replica of the company's soda can outside the Russian space station.
- Tnuva (1997): Israeli milk company Tnuva filmed a commercial for their product on the former Russian space station Mir. The commercial aired in August 1997 and holds the Guinness World Record for the first advertisement shot in space.
- Pizza Hut (2000): In 2000, Pizza Hut paid approximately $1 million to have the company logo featured on a Proton rocket that was being launched to the International Space Station by Russia. In 2001, Pizza Hut delivered a 6-inch salami pizza to the International Space Station.
- Nissin Foods (2005) sent vacuum-sealed Cup Noodles to space that were eaten by cosmonaut Sergei Krikalev for a TV commercial.
- Element 21 (2006): Russian cosmonaut Mikhail Tyurin hit a golf ball from the ISS porch as part of a commercial with Element 21.
- Toshiba Space Chair Project (2009): Toshiba used helium balloons to bring four empty chairs to the edge of space and filmed a TV commercial for their Regza HD TVs.
- Lowe's & Made in Space 3D Printer (2016): Sent a 3D printer to the International Space Station.
- KFC (2017) launched the Zinger-1 mission, sending a KFC Zinger Sandwich to the edge of space. This mission was a test flight for World View Enterprises' satellite high-altitude balloons.
- SpaceX (2018) sent a Tesla Roadster into orbit as the dummy payload for the first Falcon Heavy test flight.
- Vegemite (2019): A group of university students from the University of Technology Sydney launched two pieces of Vegemite toast on a stratospheric balloon from the Hunter Valley region, located north of Sydney.
- Rocket Lab (2019) sent a reflective sphere, the Humanity Star, into orbit.
- LIT Energy (2026) was advertised on the outside of the lower stage on Soyuz MS-29 flight to the ISS.

==== Failed attempts ====
Although the number of attempts at space advertising is small, there have been several failed attempts to send advertising into space by companies and organizations around the world.

Some failed attempts include:

- France's “Ring of Light” Project (1989): This project was intended as a tribute to the 100th anniversary of the building of the Eiffel Tower. It involved the launch of a ring of 100 reflectors that would link together, reflecting the sun's light to become visible for about 10 minutes out of every 90-minute orbital period. It was ultimately called off due to concern that it could interfere with space-related scientific research and widespread criticism from the general public.
- The Znamya Project (1990s): A Russian space program that involved the launch of satellites designed to reflect and beam sunlight to polar regions on Earth.
- Space Marketing Inc. (1993) proposed launching a billboard into space. This was ultimately blocked by House of Representatives members who passed legislation to prevent the issuing of launch licenses for the purpose of putting advertisements in space.
- PepsiCo Billboard (2019): The Russian branch of PepsiCo Inc. partnered with Russian startup StartRocket for the attempted creation of an orbital billboard. There was a successful exploratory test of orbital advertisements; however, this attempt was ultimately stopped when the plan was denied by PepsiCo's U.S. Branch.

== Challenges ==
=== Regulation ===
Different countries have varying advertising regulation levels. As advertisements that orbit the Earth, effectively operating across country borders, obtrusive space advertisements must necessarily grapple with these regulatory differences. For instance, the EU prohibits advertisers from airing tobacco or alcohol-related advertisements. Ireland also outlaws advertisements that undermine public authority. Regulatory differences may make it more challenging for obtrusive space advertisements to remain legal across multiple jurisdictions.

Beyond content-based regulations, consumers in countries like the United States have the right to opt out of receiving ads. It is unclear whether or not a consumer can effectively opt out of receiving space-based advertisements (e.g., by closing one's blinds).

Property rights are another legal concern. Due to the bright lighting of space-based ads, non-consenting property owners may raise legal challenges, arguing that the ads constitute a nuisance and violate their legally held rights.

=== Astronomical observations ===
The International Astronomical Union argues that artificial satellites built out of reflective material adversely impact astronomical observations. A paper that was presented to the United Nations stated that "scattered light from sunlit spacecraft and space debris, and radio noise from communications satellites and global positioning systems in space, reach the entire surface of the Earth”. Obtrusive space advertisements that are comparable to the brightness of the moon have the potential to make the observation of faint, distant objects impossible from the earth's surface.

=== Space debris ===
Space objects that have surpassed their functional use period and are not equipped with de-orbiting technology are considered space debris. This can lead to collisions with other space objects, which can contribute to a cascading increase in space debris known as the Kessler syndrome. Increasing amounts of space debris can make space exploration and utilization of Low Earth Orbit (LEO) more difficult.

Space advertisers could face penalties if the advertisements are considered to eventually become space debris. Because objects in orbit can remain in orbit for long periods of time, it is possible that the object remains in orbit longer than the advertising entity still exists. If approved, obtrusive space advertisers can expect to comply with end-of-life de-orbiting and anti-collision measures.

== Regulations ==
While space advertising is a relatively new concept, it is subject to some international treaties and national policies, either specifically on space advertising or space commercial activities.

=== For obtrusive advertising ===
- UN treaties
  - The Outer Space Treaty (1966) sets principles of international space law. It determines that all states should have the right to freely explore outer space. This treaty provides free access to space, so space advertising is not subject to global prohibition.
  - The Space Liability Convention (1972) rules that a state is fully liable for damages caused by space objects launched in its territory. Under this treaty, states are responsible for private launches for commercial purposes, including advertising.
- The United States
  - 51 U.S. Code 50911 prohibits the issuance of licenses and launches for activities involving obtrusive space advertising. This prohibition does not apply to other forms of advertising, such as displaying logos. Both launches with commercial licenses and launches with experimentation permits allow the display of logos.
- Other nations
  - In November 2016, Japan legislated a licensing system for private-sector companies' launches. This act aims to stimulate Japanese commercial activities in space by supporting third-party liability insurance and channeling more liability onto launching companies to reassure customers who pay the launchers.
  - Russia prohibits launches that contaminate outer space and create unfavorable environmental changes. However, there is no explicit ban on space advertising, despite the light pollution and debris it potentially creates.

=== For non-obtrusive advertising ===
- The United States
  - Public law 106-391 does not apply to non-obtrusive commercial space advertising, including commercial space transportation vehicles, space infrastructure payloads, space launch facilities, and launch support facilities.
  - NASA (National Aeronautics and Space Administration) does not permit use of the NASA insignia, logo, or other supporting graphics in advertisements. However, it is discussing loosening its commercial restriction policy as a governmental agency. It is considering selling its spacecraft's naming rights for financial gain. Loosening such restrictions could encourage more brands to conduct space advertising.
  - NASA supports the production of commercials or other marketing videos. In 2019, NASA opened the International Space Station (ISS) for space advertising and other short-duration commercial activities conducted by private companies' crews.
- Other nations
  - No other country has explicit legislative regulations for non-obtrusive space advertising. The non-obtrusive advertising of the states’ own entities and private corporate entities is less problematic under national and international laws compared to obtrusive space advertising.

== In popular culture ==
Advertising in outer space or space flight has been featured in several science fiction books, films, video games, and television series. They are usually shown as a satire of commercialization.

=== Film ===
- In the 2008 animated science fiction film WALL-E, the star-liner spacecraft Axiom features a wide variety of advertisements for Buy n Large products.
- In the 2008 film Hancock, the logo of the fictitious All-Heart charity is painted on the Moon by the title character.
  Logo used by the Planet Express company in Futurama.

=== Literature ===
- In Fredric Brown's 1945 short story, "Pi in the Sky," an inventor rearranges the apparent positions of the stars to form an advertising slogan.
- In Robert A. Heinlein's 1951 novella The Man Who Sold the Moon, the protagonist raises funds for his lunar ambitions by publicly describing means of covering the visible lunar face in advertising and propaganda and then taking money not to do so.
- In Arthur C. Clarke's 1956 set of linked stories Venture to the Moon, within the story Watch this Space, a sodium cannon is modified by one of the parties - and, as the narrator notes, with great financial inducement and reward—to modify the exit nozzle of the cannon to paint the non-illuminated portion of the Moon visible from Earth with the logo of a soft drink company. As the sodium atoms enter the sunlight, they glow in contrast to the darker Moon surface below as the party escapes into space. While the story implies that this company may be Coca-Cola, there is sufficient ambiguity that this company may also have been Pepsi or another unnamed corporation.
- In Isaac Asimov's 1958 short story "Buy Jupiter", a group of extraterrestrials broker a deal with the governments of Earth to purchase the planet Jupiter for use as an advertisement platform for passing starships from their worlds.
- In Franquin's 1961 comics album, Z comme Zorglub, Zorglub attempts to write an advertisement for Coca-Cola on the Moon.
- A Red Dwarf novel features an advertising campaign whereby a ship is sent on a mission by The Coca-Cola Company to cause 128 stars to go supernova in order to visibly spell the words "Coke Adds Life!" across the sky on Earth. The message is intended to last five weeks and be visible even in daylight.

=== Television ===
- In the 2025 anime series Apocalypse Hotel, the titular hotel creates a space programme both to promote the hotel and also to protect it using rods from God satellies.
