= STS-51-F =

1985 American crewed spaceflight

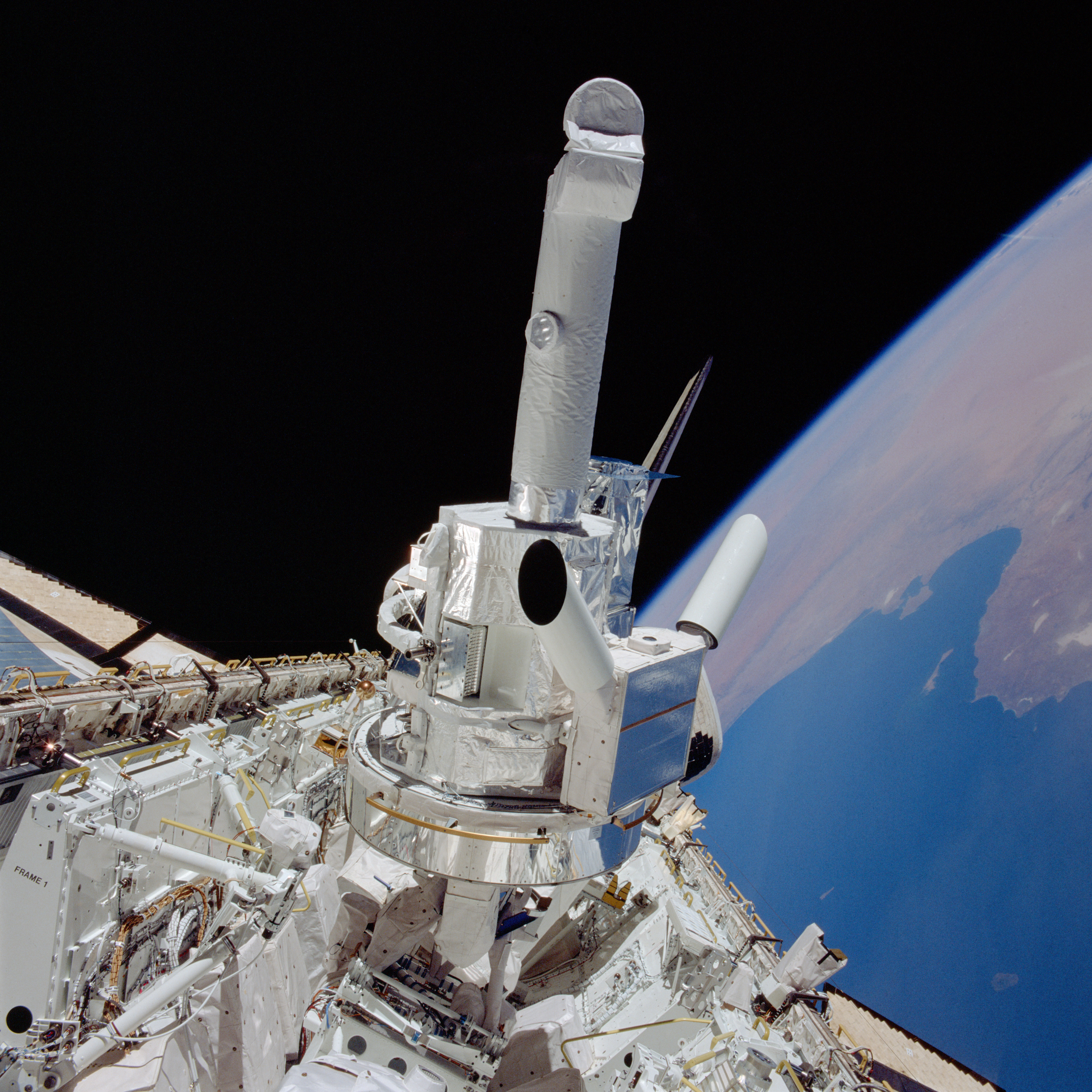
- Experiments in Challenger's payload bay
- Names: Space Transportation System-19; Spacelab 2
- Mission type: Astronomical observations
- Operator: NASA
- COSPAR ID: 1985-063A
- SATCAT no.: 15925
- Mission duration: 7 days, 22 hours, 45 minutes, 26 seconds
- Distance travelled: 5,284,350 km (3,283,540 mi)
- Orbits completed: 127

Spacecraft properties
- Spacecraft: Space Shuttle Challenger
- Launch mass: 114,693 kg (252,855 lb)
- Landing mass: 98,309 kg (216,734 lb)
- Payload mass: 16,309 kg (35,955 lb)

Crew
- Crew size: 7
- Members: C. Gordon Fullerton; Roy D. Bridges Jr.; Karl G. Henize; F. Story Musgrave; Anthony W. England; Loren W. Acton; John-David F. Bartoe

Start of mission
- Launch date: 21:00, July 29, 1985 (UTC) (5:00 pm EDT)
- Launch site: Kennedy, LC-39A
- Contractor: Rockwell International

End of mission
- Landing date: August 6, 1985, 19:45:26 UTC (12:45:26 pm PDT)
- Landing site: Edwards, Runway 23

Orbital parameters
- Reference system: Geocentric orbit
- Regime: Low Earth orbit
- Perigee altitude: 312 km (194 mi)
- Apogee altitude: 320 km (200 mi)
- Inclination: 49.49°
- Period: 90.90 minutes

Instruments
- Carbonated Beverage Dispenser Evaluation; Infrared telescope (IRT); Instrument Pointing System (IPS); Plasma Diagnostics Package (PDP); Shuttle Amateur Radio Experiment
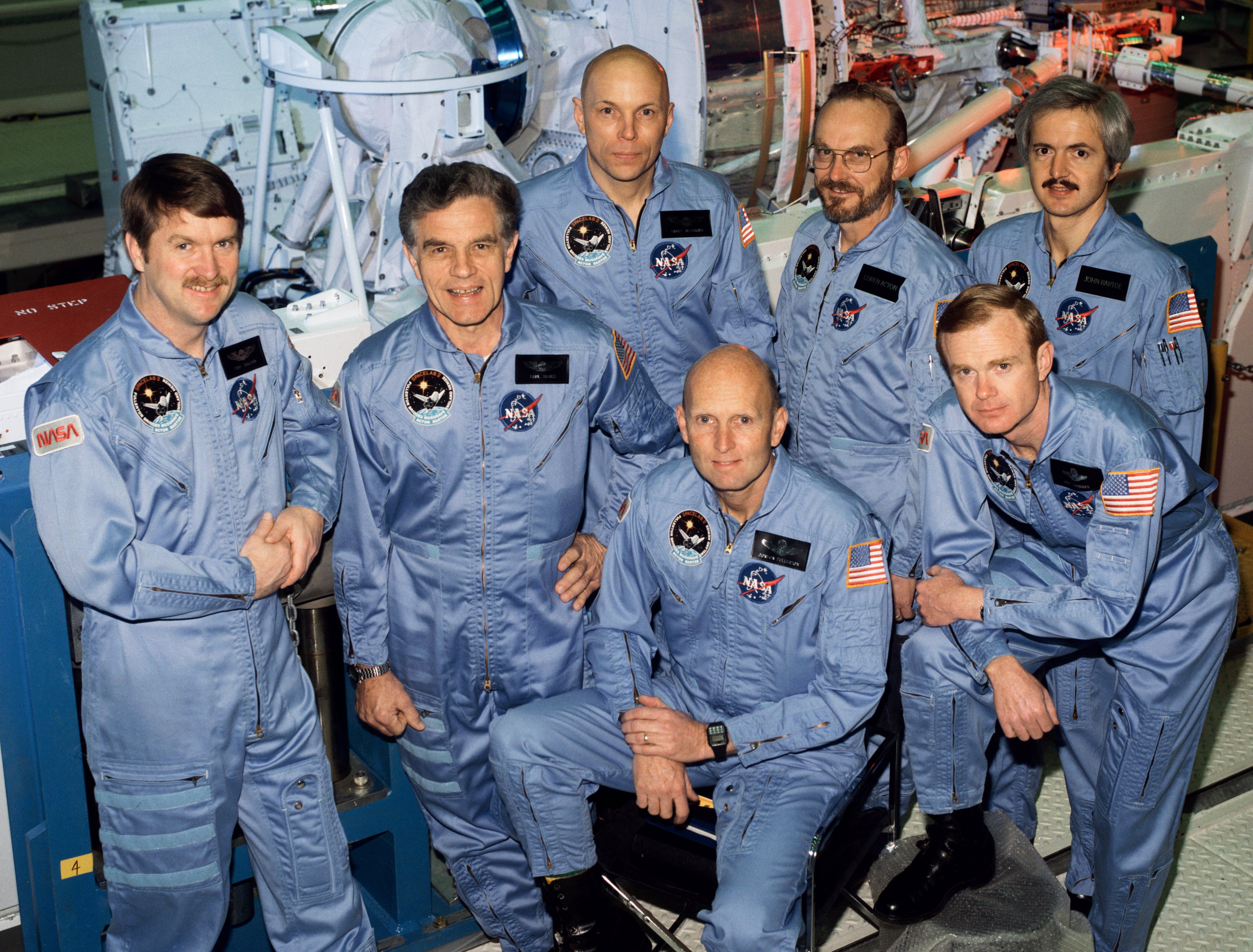
- STS-51-F mission patch Front row (seated): C. Gordon Fullerton, Roy D. Bridges Jr. Back row (standing): Anthony W. England, Karl G. Henize, F. Story Musgrave, Loren W. Acton, John-David F. Bartoe Space Shuttle program

STS-51-F (also known as Spacelab 2) was the 19th flight of NASA's Space Shuttle program and the eighth flight of Space Shuttle Challenger. It launched from Kennedy Space Center, Florida, on July 29, 1985, and landed eight days later on August 6, 1985.

While STS-51-F's primary payload was the Spacelab 2 laboratory module, the payload that received the most publicity was the Carbonated Beverage Dispenser Evaluation, which was an experiment in which both Coca-Cola and Pepsi tried to make their carbonated drinks available to astronauts. A helium-cooled infrared telescope (IRT) was also flown on this mission, and while it did have some problems, it observed 60% of the galactic plane in infrared light.

During launch, Challenger experienced multiple sensor failures in its Engine 1 Center SSME, which led to it shutting down. As a result, the shuttle had to perform an "Abort to Orbit" (ATO) emergency procedure. It is the only Shuttle mission to have carried out an abort after launching. As a result of the ATO, the mission was carried out at a slightly lower orbital altitude.

== Crew ==
Position	Astronaut
Commander	C. Gordon Fullerton; Second and last spaceflight
Pilot	Roy D. Bridges Jr. Only spaceflight
Mission Specialist 1	Karl G. Henize; Only spaceflight
Mission Specialist 2 Flight Engineer	F. Story Musgrave; Second spaceflight
Mission Specialist 3	Anthony W. England; Only spaceflight
Payload Specialist 1	Loren W. Acton; Only spaceflight Lockheed
Payload Specialist 2	John-David F. Bartoe; Only spaceflight United States Navy
Member of Blue Team; Member of Red Team As with previous Spacelab missions, the crew was divided between two 12-hour shifts. Acton, Bridges and Henize made up the "Red Team" while Bartoe, England and Musgrave comprised the "Blue Team"; commander Fullerton could take either shift when needed. Challenger carried two Extravehicular Mobility Units (EMU) in the event of an emergency spacewalk, which would have been performed by England and Musgrave.

Backup crew
Position	Astronaut
Payload Specialist 1	George W. Simon; Lockheed
Payload Specialist 2	Dianne K. Prinz; United States Navy

=== Crew seat assignments ===
Seat	Launch	Landing	Seats 1–4 are on the flight deck. Seats 5–7 are on the mid-deck.
1	Fullerton		Seats 1–4 are on the flight deck. Seats 5–7 are on the mid-deck.
2	Bridges		Seats 1–4 are on the flight deck. Seats 5–7 are on the mid-deck.
3	Henize		Seats 1–4 are on the flight deck. Seats 5–7 are on the mid-deck.
4	Musgrave		Seats 1–4 are on the flight deck. Seats 5–7 are on the mid-deck.
5	England		Seats 1–4 are on the flight deck. Seats 5–7 are on the mid-deck.
6	Acton		Seats 1–4 are on the flight deck. Seats 5–7 are on the mid-deck.
7	Bartoe		Seats 1–4 are on the flight deck. Seats 5–7 are on the mid-deck.

== Launch ==
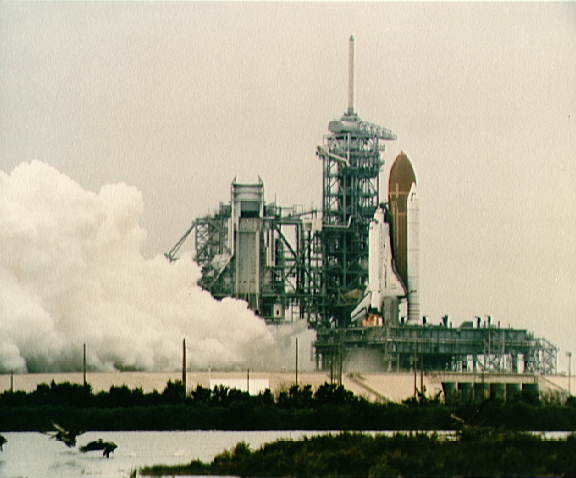
Aborted launch attempt at T−3 seconds on July 12, 1985

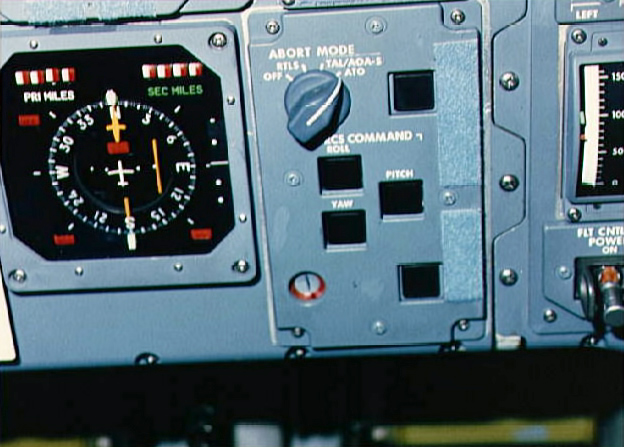
The control panel of the Shuttle on the STS-51-F mission, showing the selection of the Abort-to-Orbit (ATO) option

STS-51-F's first launch attempt on July 12, 1985, was halted with the countdown at T−3 seconds after main engine ignition, when a malfunction of the number two RS-25 coolant valve caused an automatic launch abort. Challenger launched successfully on its second attempt on July 29, 1985, at 17:00 p.m. EDT, after a delay of 1 hour 37 minutes due to a problem with the table maintenance block update uplink.

At 3 minutes 31 seconds into the ascent, one of the center engine's two high-pressure fuel turbopump turbine discharge temperature sensors failed. Two minutes and twelve seconds later, the second sensor failed, causing the shutdown of the center engine. This was the only in-flight RS-25 failure of the Space Shuttle program. Approximately 8 minutes into the flight, one of the same temperature sensors in the right engine failed, and the remaining right-engine temperature sensor displayed readings near the redline for engine shutdown. Booster Systems Engineer Jenny M. Howard acted quickly to recommend that the crew inhibit any further automatic RS-25 shutdowns based on readings from the remaining sensors, preventing the potential shutdown of a second engine and a possible abort mode that may have resulted in the loss of crew and vehicle (LOCV).

The failed RS-25 resulted in an Abort to Orbit (ATO) trajectory, whereby the shuttle achieved a lower-than-planned orbital altitude. The plan had been for a 385 km (239 mi) by 382 km (237 mi) orbit, but the mission was carried out at 265 km (165 mi) by 262 km (163 mi).

Attempt	Planned	Result	Turnaround	Reason	Decision point	Weather go (%)	Notes
1	12 Jul 1985, 3:30:00 pm	Scrubbed	—	Technical	12 Jul 1985, 3:29 pm (T−00:00:03)		Pad abort: malfunction in SSME #2 coolant valve shutdown of all three main engines.
2	29 Jul 1985, 5:00:00 pm	Success	17 days 1 hour 30 minutes				Launched after 1 hour 37 minute delay to resolve issue with table maintenance block update uplink. At T+343 seconds, SSME #1 shut down leading to ATO (Abort to Orbit).

== Mission summary ==
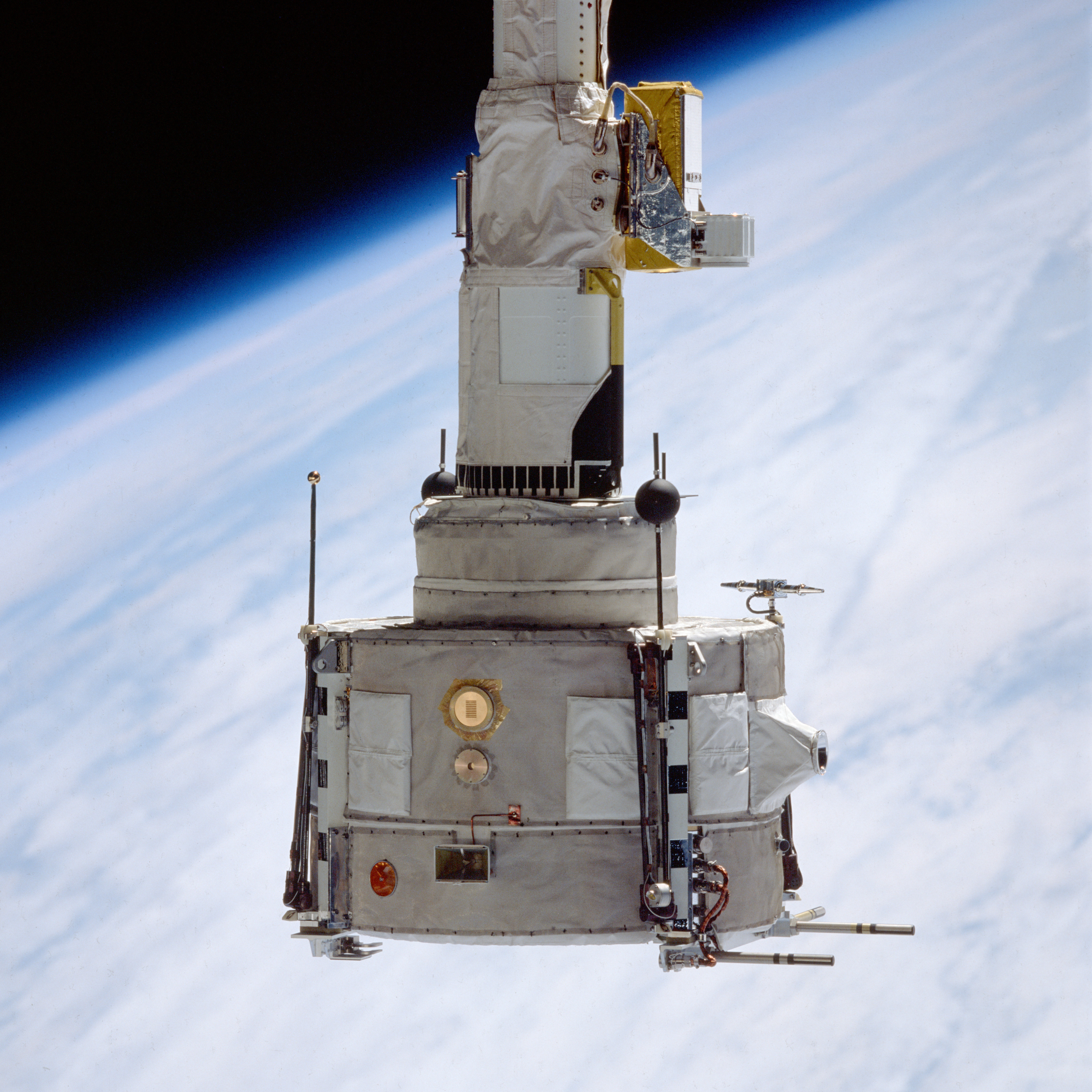
The Plasma Diagnostics Package (PDP) grappled by the Canadarm

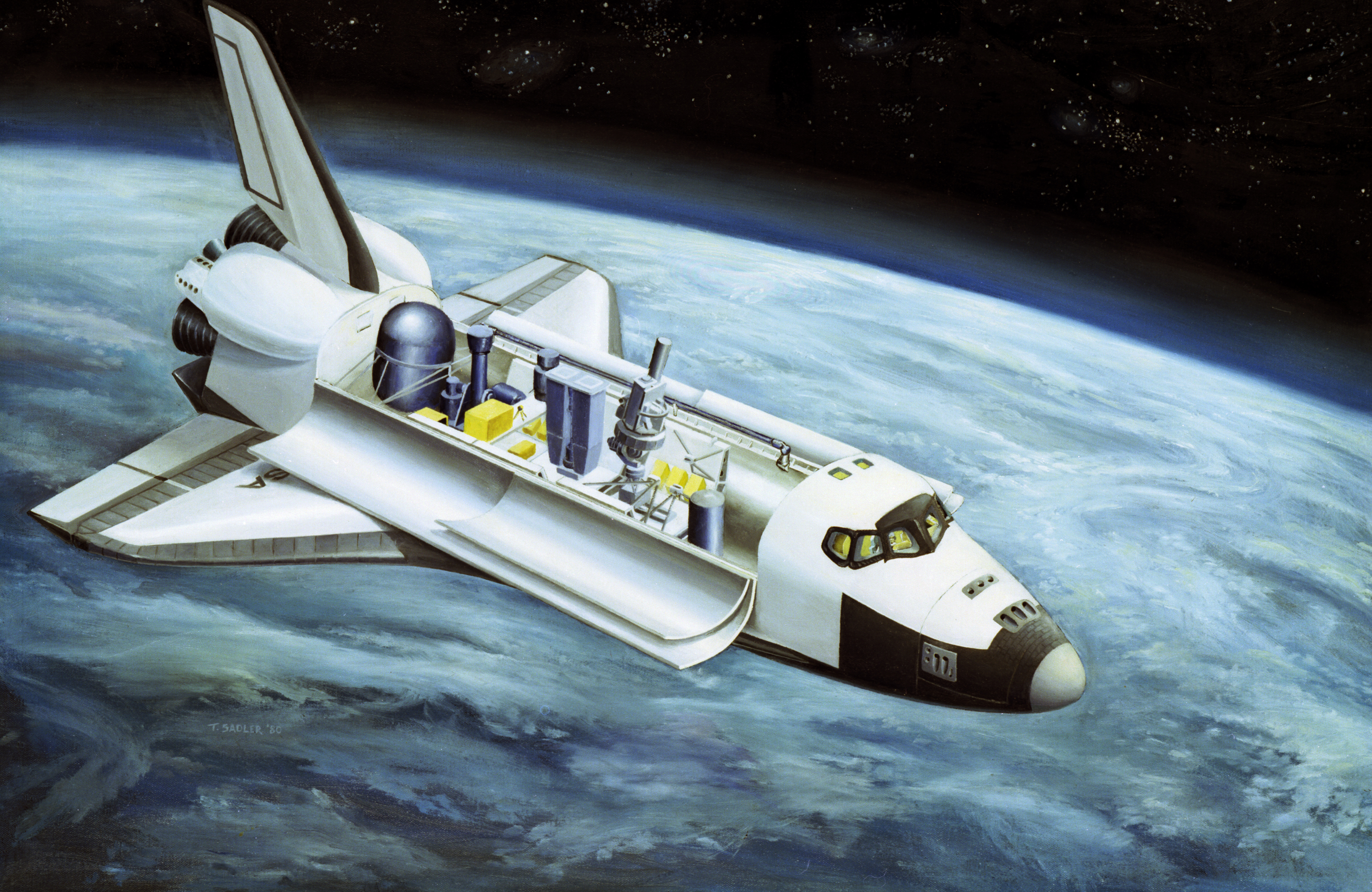
Space art for the Spacelab 2 mission, showing some of the various experiments in the payload bay

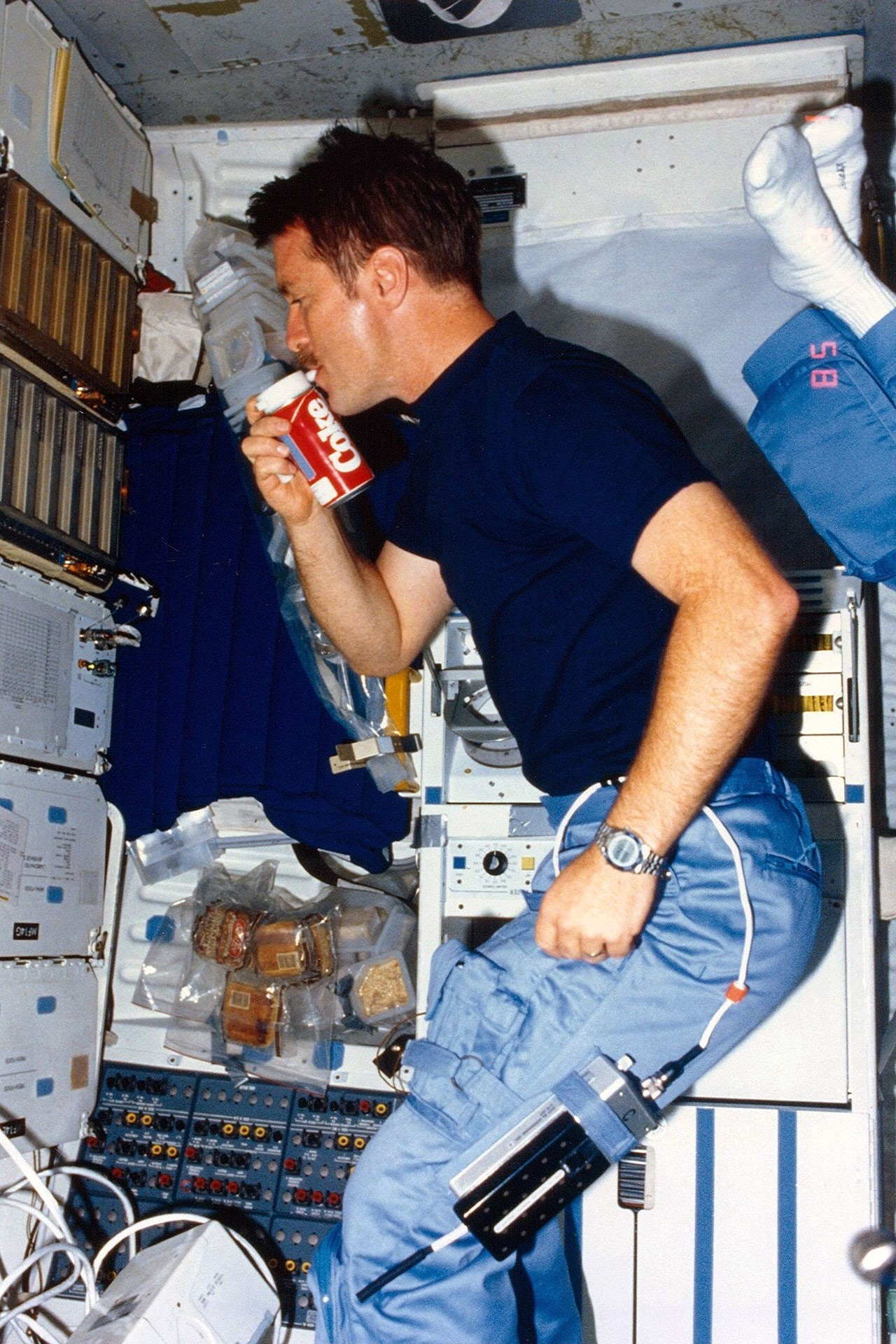
Tony England drinks soda in space

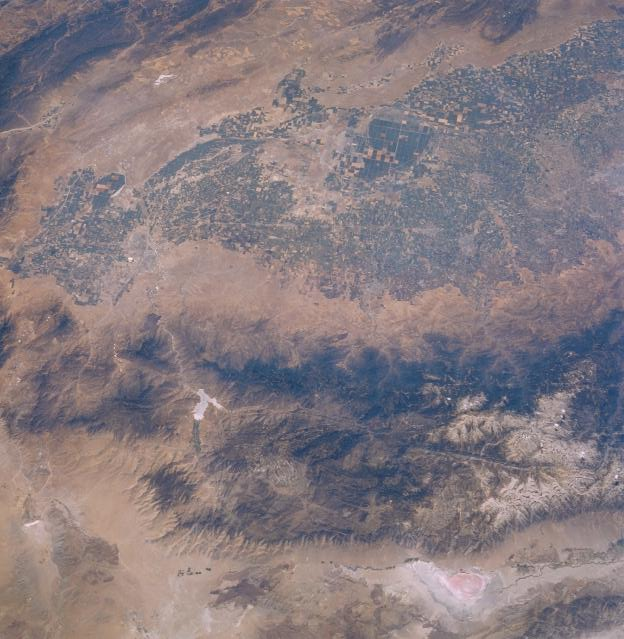
A view of the Sierra Nevada mountains and surroundings from Earth orbit, taken on the STS-51-F mission

STS-51-F's primary payload was the laboratory module Spacelab 2. A special part of the modular Spacelab system, the "igloo", which was located at the head of a three-pallet train, provided on-site support to instruments mounted on pallets. The main mission objective was to verify performance of Spacelab systems, determine the interface capability of the orbiter, and measure the environment created by the spacecraft. Experiments covered life sciences, plasma physics, astronomy, high-energy astrophysics, solar physics, atmospheric physics and technology research. Despite mission replanning necessitated by Challenger's abort to orbit trajectory, the Spacelab mission was declared a success.

The flight marked the first time the European Space Agency (ESA) Instrument Pointing System (IPS) was tested in orbit. This unique pointing instrument was designed with an accuracy of one arcsecond. Initially, some problems were experienced when it was commanded to track the Sun, but a series of software fixes were made and the problem was corrected. In addition, Anthony W. England became the second amateur radio operator to transmit from space during the mission.

=== Spacelab Infrared Telescope ===
The Spacelab Infrared Telescope (IRT) was also flown on the mission. The IRT was a 15.2 cm (6.0 in) aperture helium-cooled infrared telescope, observing light between wavelengths of 1.7 to 118 μm. It was thought heat emissions from the Shuttle would corrupt long-wavelength data, however it still returned useful astronomical data. Another problem was that a piece of mylar insulation broke loose and floated in the line-of-sight of the telescope. IRT collected infrared data on 60% of the galactic plane. (see also List of largest infrared telescopes) A later space mission that experienced a stray light problem from debris was Gaia astrometry spacecraft launch in 2013 by the ESA—the source of the stray light was later identified as the fibers of the sunshield, protruding beyond the edges of the shield.

=== Carbonated Beverage Dispenser Evaluation ===
In a heavily publicized marketing experiment, astronauts aboard STS-51-F drank carbonated beverages from specially designed cans from Cola Wars competitors Coca-Cola and Pepsi. According to Acton, after Coke developed its experimental dispenser for an earlier shuttle flight, Pepsi insisted to American president Ronald Reagan that Coke should not be the first cola in space. The experiment was delayed until Pepsi could develop its own system, and the two companies' products were assigned to STS-51-F.

Blue Team tested Coke, and Red Team tested Pepsi. As part of the experiment, each team was photographed with the cola logo. Acton said that while the sophisticated Coke system "dispensed soda kind of like what we're used to drinking on Earth", the Pepsi can was a shaving cream can with the Pepsi logo on a paper wrapper, which "dispensed soda filled with bubbles" that was "not very drinkable". Acton said that when he gives speeches in schools, audiences are much more interested in hearing about the cola experiment than in solar physics. Post-flight, the astronauts revealed that they preferred Tang, in part because it could be mixed on-orbit with existing chilled-water supplies, whereas there was no dedicated refrigeration equipment on board to chill the cans, which also fizzed excessively in microgravity.

=== Other payloads ===
The Plasma Diagnostics Package (PDP), which had been previously flown on STS-3, made its return on the mission, and was part of a set of plasma physics experiments designed to study the Earth's ionosphere. During the third day of the mission, it was grappled out of the payload bay by the Remote Manipulator System (Canadarm) and released for six hours. During this time, Challenger maneuvered around the PDP as part of a targeted proximity operations exercise. The PDP was successfully grappled by the Canadarm and returned to the payload bay at the beginning of the fourth day of the mission.

In an experiment during the mission, thruster rockets were fired at a point over Tasmania and also above Boston to create two "holes" – plasma depletion regions – in the ionosphere. A worldwide group of geophysicists collaborated with the observations made from Spacelab 2.

An eggshell and the bone of a baby Maiasaura (a hadrosaurid dinosaur from Cretaceous North America), were brought along on the mission by Acton. They became the first dinosaur fossils to have ever been brought into space.

== Landing ==
Challenger landed at Edwards Air Force Base, California, on August 6, 1985, at 12:45:26 p.m. PDT. Its rollout distance was 2,612 m (8,570 ft). The mission had been extended by 17 orbits for additional payload activities due to the Abort to Orbit. The orbiter arrived back at Kennedy Space Center on August 11, 1985.

== Mission insignia ==
The mission insignia was designed by Houston, Texas, artist Skip Bradley. Space Shuttle Challenger is depicted ascending toward the heavens in search of new knowledge in the field of solar and stellar astronomy, with its Spacelab 2 payload. The constellations Leo and Orion are shown in the positions they were in relative to the Sun during the flight. The nineteen stars indicate that the mission is the 19th shuttle flight.

== Legacy ==
One of the purposes of the mission was to test how suitable the Shuttle was for conducting infrared observations, and the IRT was operated on this mission. However, the orbiter was found to have some drawbacks for infrared astronomy, and this led to later infrared telescopes being free-flying from the Shuttle orbiter.

== See also ==
- List of human spaceflights
- List of Space Shuttle missions
- Salyut 7 (a space station of the Soviet Union also in orbit at this time)
  - Soyuz T-13 (a mission to salvage that space station in the summer of 1985)
