= John-David F. Bartoe =

American astrophysicist and astronaut (born 1944)

John-David Francis Bartoe
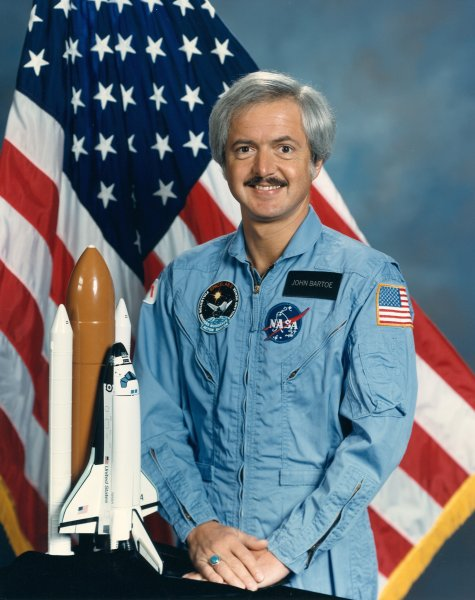
- Born: November 17, 1944 (age 81); Abington, Pennsylvania
- Occupation: Astrophysicist
- Space career

USN Payload Specialist
- Status: Retired
- Time in space: 7d 22h 45min
- Missions: STS-51-F

John-David Francis Bartoe (born November 17, 1944, in Abington, Pennsylvania) is an American astrophysicist. He is the Research Manager for the International Space Station (ISS) at NASA's Johnson Space Center. He provides oversight for the Program Manager concerning the research capability, research hardware, and research plans of the ISS. As a civilian employee of the US Navy, he flew aboard Space Shuttle mission STS-51-F as a Payload Specialist.

== Background ==
Prior to his present position, Bartoe was Director of Operations and Utilization in the Space Station Office of NASA Headquarters from 1990 to 1994. He also served as Chief Scientist for the Space Station from 1987 to 1990.

Before coming to NASA Headquarters, he flew on Space Shuttle mission STS-51-F (July 29 to August 6, 1985) as a civilian Navy payload specialist. A physicist by training, Bartoe was co-investigator on two solar physics investigations aboard this mission, designated Spacelab 2, that were designed to study features of the Sun's outer layers. In completing this flight, Bartoe traveled over 2.8 million miles in 126 Earth orbits and logged over 190 hours in space.

From 1966 to 1988, Bartoe worked as an astrophysicist at the Naval Research Laboratory in Washington, D.C., and published over 60 papers in the field of solar physics observations and instrumentation. He received his Bachelor of Science in physics from Lehigh University (1966) and his Master of Science and Doctor of Philosophy in physics from Georgetown University (1974 and 1976, respectively).

Bartoe is a member of the Association of Space Explorers, and is Chairman of the Space Stations Committee of the International Astronautical Federation. His awards include the NASA Exceptional Achievement Medal, the Navy Distinguished Civilian Service Award, the Flight Achievement Award of the American Astronautical Society, the NASA Space Flight Medal, and the NASA Skylab Achievement Award.
