= Loren Acton =

American astronaut and physicist (born 1936)

Loren Wilber Acton
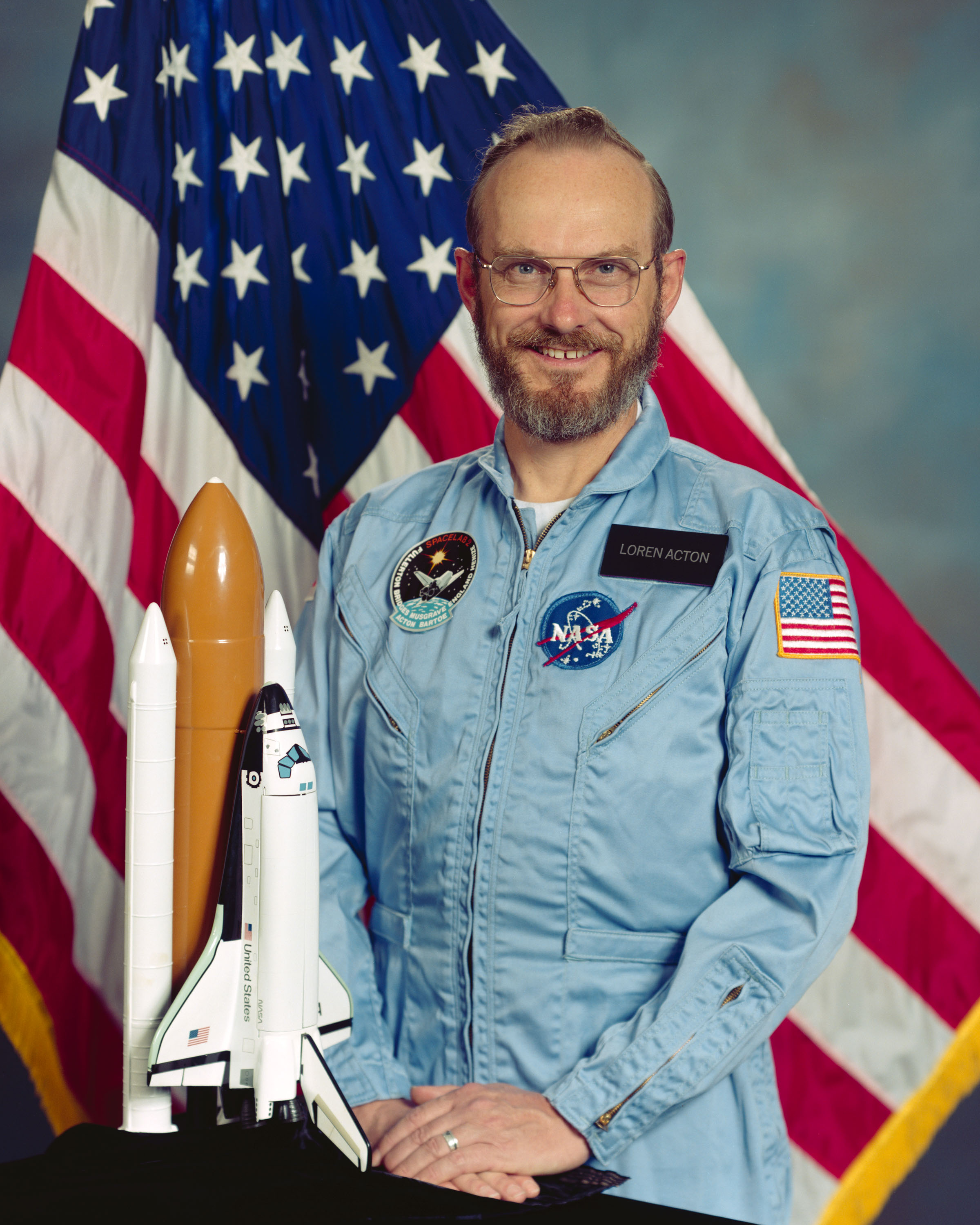
- Born: March 7, 1936 (age 90); Lewistown, Montana, United States
- Citizenship: American
- Education: Montana State University, (BS); University of Colorado, Boulder, (PhD)
- Occupation: Solar X-ray Physicist
- Children: Cheryll Glotfelty
- Space career

Lockheed Payload Specialist
- Status: Retired
- Time in space: 7d 22h 45min
- Missions: STS-51-F

Loren Wilber Acton (born March 7, 1936) is an American physicist who flew on Space Shuttle mission STS-51-F as a Payload Specialist for the Lockheed Palo Alto Research Laboratory. He is also the father of Cheryll Glotfelty, a leading ecocritic.

== Early life and education ==
Acton was born in Lewistown, Montana. He received a bachelor of science degree in Engineering Physics from Montana State University in 1959, and a Doctor of Philosophy in astrophysics from the University of Colorado at Boulder in 1965.

== Career ==
Acton was a senior staff scientist with the Space Sciences Laboratory, Lockheed Palo Alto Research Laboratory, California. As a research scientist, his principal duties included conducting scientific studies of the Sun and other celestial objects using advanced space instruments and serving as a co-investigator on one of the Spacelab 2 solar experiments, the Solar Optical Universal Polarimeter. He was selected as one of four payload specialists for Spacelab 2 on August 9, 1978, and after seven years of training he flew on STS-51-F/ Spacelab-2 in 1985. At the conclusion of the mission, Acton had travelled over 2.8 million miles in 126 Earth orbits, logging over 190 hours in space.

Acton is married and has two children. In 2006 he ran in an election to be the state representative of Montana's District 69, as a Democratic candidate. In the event, he lost to the Republican incumbent, Jack M. Wells of Belgrade.

Acton is currently retired from his role as a Research Professor of Physics at Montana State University, where he was responsible for the formation of the Solar Physics group and the Space Science and Engineering Laboratory. The MSU solar group carries on an active research program under NASA and NSF support and is actively involved in day-to-day operation and scientific utilization of satellite missions for studies of the Sun. Acton was a principal investigator for Soft X-ray Telescope (SXT) experiment on the Japan/US/UK Yohkoh mission "Yohkoh Legacy Archive". The Yohkoh mission focused on the study of high-energy solar processes, such as solar flares, eruptions and the heating of the corona. The primary emission of the extremely hot outer atmosphere of the Sun, the solar corona, is at X-ray wavelengths. The extended duration, high resolution, X-ray imagery from Yohkoh contribute to the study of why the Sun has a corona at all and why it varies in intensity so strongly in response to the 11-year sunspot cycle.

== Awards ==
- 2000 George Ellery Hale Prize by the Solar Physics Division of the American Astronomical Society
- Recognized in February 2020 as Legacy Fellow of American Astronomical Society
- 2017 The Order of the Rising Sun, Gold Rays with Neck Ribbon by Japanese government
