= Anthony W. England =

American astronaut and geophysicist (born 1942)

Tony England
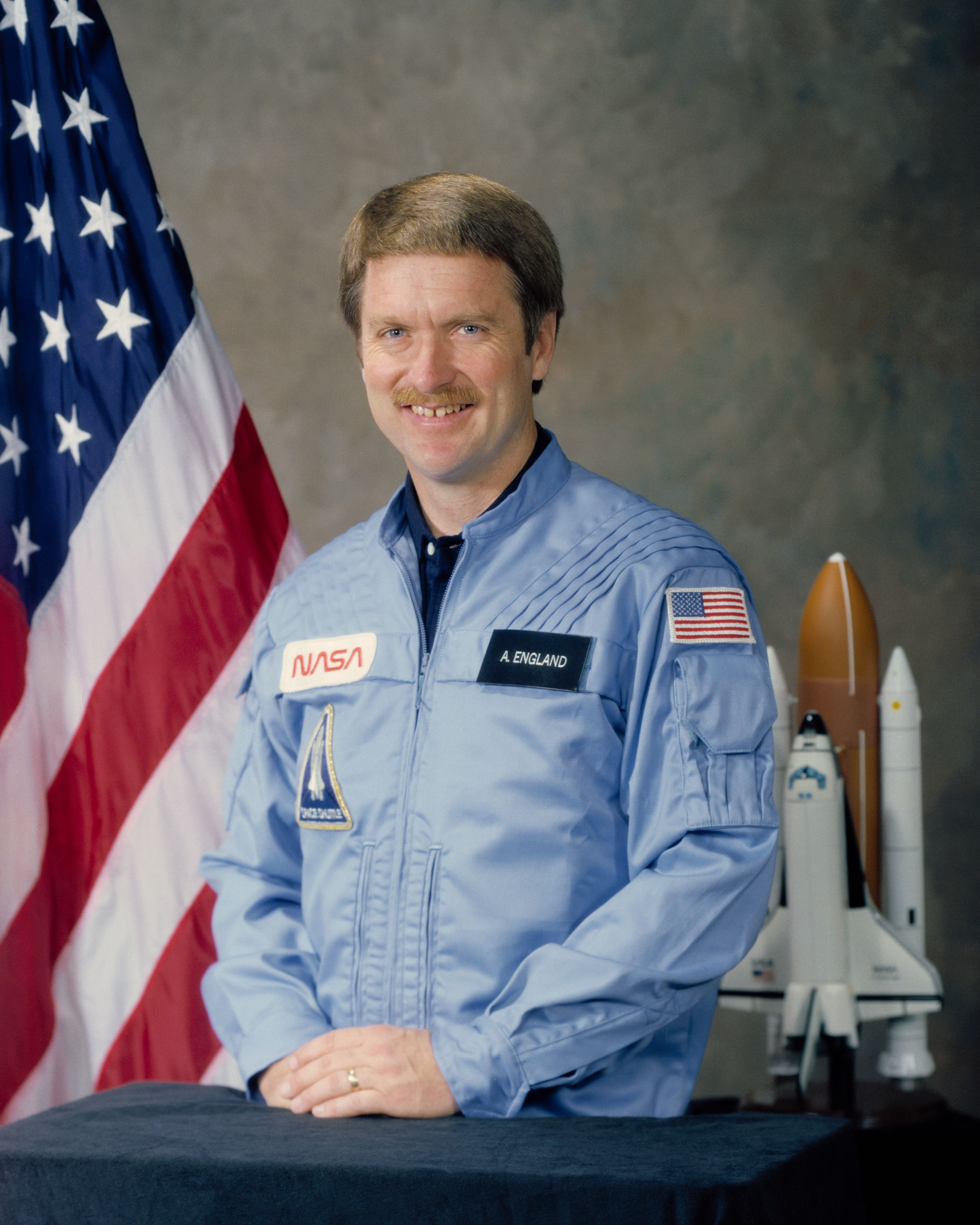
- Born: Anthony Wayne England; May 15, 1942 (age 84); Indianapolis, Indiana, U.S.
- Education: Massachusetts Institute of Technology (BS, MS, PhD)
- Space career

NASA astronaut
- Time in space: 7d 22h 45min
- Selection: NASA Group 6 (1967)
- Missions: STS-51-F
- Retired: August 31, 1988
- Scientific career
- Fields: Geophysics
- Thesis: Equations of State of Oxides and Silicates and New Data on the Elastic Properties of Spinel, Magnetite, and Cadmium Oxide (1970)

Anthony Wayne England (born May 15, 1942) is an American former NASA astronaut. Selected in 1967, England was among a group of astronauts who served as backups during the Apollo and Skylab programs. Like most others in his class, he flew during the Space Shuttle program, serving as a mission specialist on STS-51-F in 1985. He has logged more than 4,000 hours of flying time and 188 hours in space.

England helped develop and use radars to probe the Moon on Apollo 17 and glaciers in Washington and Alaska. He participated in and led field parties during two seasons in Antarctica.

England was the former dean of the College of Engineering and Computer Science at the University of Michigan–Dearborn.

== Biography ==
=== Early years and education ===
England was born May 15, 1942, in Indianapolis, Indiana, but his hometown is West Fargo, North Dakota. He attended primary school in Indianapolis, Indiana, and graduated from high school in North Dakota. At the Massachusetts Institute of Technology (MIT) he received his Bachelor of Science and Master of Science degrees in Earth and planetary sciences (course 12A) in 1965, and a Doctor of Philosophy degree in Earth and planetary sciences in 1970. England was a graduate fellow at MIT for the three years immediately preceding his first assignment to NASA.

=== Career ===
England was selected as a scientist-astronaut by NASA in August 1967, as part of the 6th astronaut selection. At 25 years 81 days old, he was the youngest candidate to be selected up to that time. He subsequently completed the initial academic training and a 53-week course in flight training at Laughlin Air Force Base, Texas. He received his wings with distinguished honors in April 1969. England served as a support crewman for the Apollo 13 and 16 flights. He was also an EVA CapCom during the Apollo 16 mission, talking to astronauts John Young and Charlie Duke while they explored the surface of the Moon. Notably, he developed and communicated instructions for construction of the lithium hydroxide canisters on Apollo 13.

England and Philip Chapman resigned from NASA in 1972, citing the era's decline in crewed missions and severe dearth of flight opportunities. Neither had flown in space at that point. England remained with the federal government at the United States Geological Survey, where he served as deputy chief of the Office of Geochemistry and Geophysics. He also served as associate editor for the Journal of Geophysical Research. He served on the National Academy's Space Studies Board, and on several federal committees concerned with Antarctic policy, nuclear waste containment and the broader vicissitudes of science and technology policy.

England returned to the Johnson Space Center in 1979 as a senior scientist-astronaut (mission specialist), was assigned to the operation mission development group of the Astronaut Office, and eventually managed that group.

==== Space Shuttle flight ====
STS-51-F, carrying a seven-man crew and Spacelab-2, was launched from Kennedy Space Center, Florida on July 29, 1985. This mission was the first pallet-only Spacelab mission and the first mission to operate the Spacelab Instrument Pointing System (IPS). It carried 13 major experiments of which seven were in the field of astronomy and solar physics, three were for studies of the Earth's ionosphere, two were life science experiments, and 1 studied the properties of superfluid helium. England was responsible for activating and operating the Spacelab systems, operating the IPS and the Remote Manipulator System, assisting with experiment operations, and performing a contingency EVA had one been necessary. After 126 orbits of the Earth, STS 51-F Challenger landed at Edwards Air Force Base, California, on August 6, 1985.

From May 1986 to May 1987, England served as a program scientist for Space Station Freedom (which later evolved into the International Space Station). From June 1987 to December 1987, he taught Remote Sensing Geophysics at Rice University. England retired from NASA in 1988.

=== Post-NASA career ===
England was the dean of the College of Engineering and Computer Science and professor of electrical engineering and computer science at the University of Michigan–Dearborn. He is also a professor of electrical engineering and computer science and atmospheric, oceanic, and of space sciences in the College of Engineering at the University of Michigan, Ann Arbor. England also served as a member of the Michigan Pipeline Safety Advisory Board and the Mackinac Straits Corridor Authority.

=== Personal ===
England was married for 51 years to his childhood sweetheart, Kathi (Kreutz) until her death in 2013 and has two daughters: Heidi and Heather. He has five grandchildren: Brandi, Spenser, Charlene, Brock, Sage.. His recreational interests include sailing and amateur radio.

England's career is chronicled in the book NASA's Scientist-Astronauts by David Shayler and Colin Burgess.

== Awards and honors ==
- Johnson Space Center Superior Achievement Award (1970)
- NASA Outstanding Scientific Achievement Medal (1973)
- U.S. Antarctic Medal (1979)
- NASA Space Flight Medal (1985)
- American Astronomical Society Space Flight Award (1986)
- NASA Exceptional Service Medal (1988)
- Department of Electrical Engineering and Computer Science Exceptional Service Award for 1994
- College of Engineering Excellence in Faculty Service Award for 1995 (Michigan)
- Fellow of the Institute of Electrical and Electronics Engineers (IEEE)
- IEEE Judith A. Resnik Award (2004), "for significant contributions to the development and application of spaceborne microwave radiometry to remote sensing".

For supporting diversity at the University of Michigan, England received the Harold R. Johnson Diversity Service Award in 2002 and the NCID Exemplary Diversity Engagement and Scholarship Award in 2009.

- Engineering Lab Building at the University of Michigan Dearborn campus was renamed after Tony England as Tony England Engineering Lab Building in 2024
