= Taylor Wang =

First Chinese Astronaut

Taylor Gun-Jin Wang
- 王赣俊
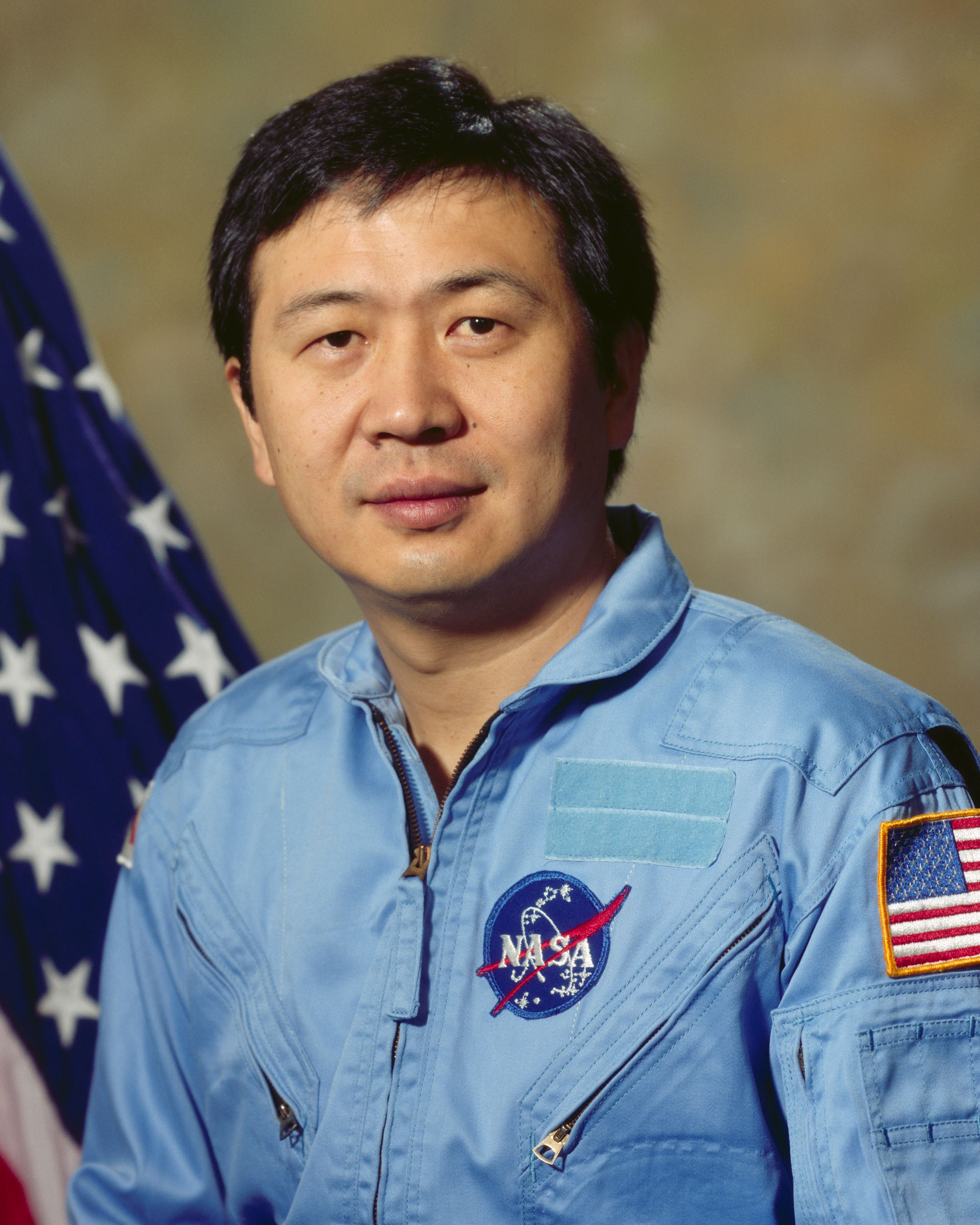
- Born: June 16, 1940 (age 86); Shanghai, Republic of China
- Education: University of California, Los Angeles (BS, MS, PhD)
- Occupation: Scientist
- Space career

JPL Payload Specialist
- Time in space: 7d 00h 08m
- Missions: STS-51-B
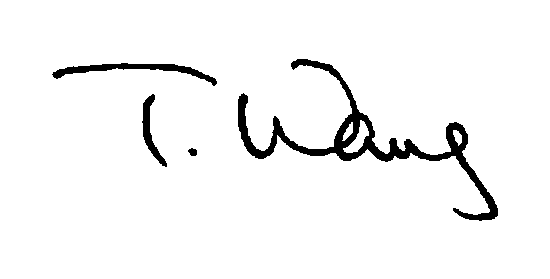
- Mission insignia: Signature

Taylor Gun-Jin Wang (simplified Chinese: 王赣骏; traditional Chinese: 王贛駿; pinyin: Wáng Gànjùn; born June 16, 1940) is a Chinese-born Taiwanese-American scientist who in 1985 became the first person of Chinese origin to go into space. While an employee of the Jet Propulsion Laboratory, Wang was a payload specialist on the Space Shuttle Challenger mission STS-51-B.

== Early life and education ==
With ancestry in Yancheng, Jiangsu, Republic of China, Wang was born in Shanghai to Wáng Zhāng (王章) and Yú Jiéhóng (俞洁虹/俞潔虹). He moved to Taiwan in 1952 with his family. He studied his later part of elementary school in Kaohsiung, and graduated from the Affiliated Senior High School of National Taiwan Normal University in Taipei, Taiwan. He later moved to Hong Kong.

Wang started studying physics at the University of California, Los Angeles, in 1963. He received his Bachelor of Science in 1967, his Master of Science in 1968, and his Ph.D. in low temperature physics (superfluid and solid state physics) in 1972.

== Career and research ==
After completing his doctorate, Wang joined the California Institute of Technology's Jet Propulsion Laboratory (JPL) in 1972, as a senior scientist. At JPL he was responsible for the inception and development of containerless processing science and technology research. He was the Principal Investigator (PI) on the Spacelab 3 mission NASA Drop Dynamics (DDM) experiments, PI on the NASA SPAR Flight Experiment #77-18 "Dynamics of Liquid Bubble," PI on the NASA SPAR Flight Experiment #76-20 "Containerless Processing Technology," and PI on the Department of Energy Experiment "Spherical Shell Technology."

He gained US citizenship in 1975, and published a paper on the dynamic behavior of rotating spheroids in zero gravity the next year. The paper received attention in NASA, and Wang was selected as a payload specialist on June 1, 1983, for the Spacelab-3 mission.

Wang conducted precursor drop dynamics experiments for the DDM in ground-based laboratories employing acoustic levitation systems, neutral buoyancy systems and drop towers, and in the near-weightless environment provided by JSC's KC-135 airplane flights and SPAR rockets. These flights have helped to define the experimental parameters and procedures in the DDM experiments performed on Spacelab 3. He is the inventor of the acoustic levitation and manipulation chamber for the DDM. (Wang, T.G., M. Saffren, D. Elleman and J.C. Fletcher (1975) Material Suspension Within an Acoustically Excited Resonant Chamber. U.S. Patent No. 3,882,732)

=== Spaceflight ===
Wang flew on STS-51-B Challenger (April 29 – May 6, 1985). STS-51B/Spacelab-3 was launched from Kennedy Space Center, Florida, and returned to land at Edwards Air Force Base, California. It was the first operational Spacelab mission. The seven-man crew aboard Challenger conducted investigations in crystal growth, drop dynamics leading to containerless material processing, atmospheric trace gas spectroscopy, solar and planetary atmospheric simulation, cosmic rays, laboratory animals and human medical monitoring.

Wang was the principal designer of an experiment called the Drop Dynamics Module, which aimed to uncover the fundamental physical behavior of liquid drops in microgravity. Despite his extensive preparation, the experiment malfunctioned upon activation. Wang, feeling immense pressure and aware of the high expectations from the Chinese community, became deeply despondent. When Wang's experiment failed, he desperately negotiated with NASA flight controllers for a chance to repair it, even threatening not to return if not allowed to fix the instrument, telling NASA flight controllers "Hey, if you guys don't give me a chance to repair my instrument, I'm not going back." Wang received permission to attempt a fix and was successful in repairing the experiment, though his remark caused concern for the safety of the crew and the mission.

The incident was covered in an Ars Technica article on 22 January 2024. There, John Fabian, mission specialist on STS-51-G, the very next shuttle flight after 51-B, was cited to explain why a lock was recently installed on the door of the side hatch: "It was installed when we got into orbit so that the door could not be opened from the inside and commit hara-kiri, kill the whole crew. That was not because of anybody we had on our flight but because of a concern about someone who had flown before 51-G."

At mission conclusion, Wang traveled over 2.9 million miles in 110 Earth orbits, and logged over 168 hours in space. While it was a successful mission, STS-51B mission commander Overmyer discovered while serving on the Challenger disaster investigation team that 51-B had had a similar problem with its O-rings during the launch. Morton Thiokol engineers told Wang's crewmate Don Lind that "you came within three-tenths of one second of dying".

=== Post-spaceflight research ===
Using insights from compound droplet experiments performed in the microgravity of NASA Shuttle Mission STS-51-B, Dr. Taylor Wang, has developed an immunoisolation encapsulation system that protects cellular transplants, and sustains cell function — without immunosuppression drugs and their resulting negative side effects. This novel immunoisolation system is a multi-component, multi-membrane capsule that allows independent optimization of all capsule design parameters ensuring reproducible functions in large animals and humans. Results of Encapsulife's successful large animal trials, have recently been published in peer-reviewed research in Transplantation Journal. In this landmark research, encapsulated canine pancreatic islets were transplanted into dogs rendered diabetic by total pancreatectomy. No immunosuppression or anti-inflammatory therapy was used. The allotransplantations of encapsulated islets were well tolerated and biocompatible, and normalized fasting blood glucose levels in all of 9 dogs, were achieved for over two hundred days, with a single transplantation. Re-transplantation of encapsulated islets — a "booster" — was effective in providing glycemic control beyond the initial 200 days.

=== Professorship ===
Wang later became a Centennial Professor at Vanderbilt University in Nashville, Tennessee. He has written about 200 journal articles and holds 28 U.S. patents on acoustics, drops and bubble dynamics, collision and coalescence of drops, charged drop dynamics, containerless science, and encapsulation of living cells. His experiments were carried out in 1985 aboard United States Spacelab 3, and in 1992 aboard United States Microgravity Laboratory 1 (USML-1), and in 1995 aboard USML-2.

== Recognition ==
Wang has received various honors and awards, including Space Flight Medal NASA 1985, Exceptional Scientific Achievement Medal NASA 1987, Asian Pacific American Achievement Award 1989. Llewellyn J. Evans Distinguished Scientific, Engineering and Management Award 1994. Educational Award Vanderbilt University Alumni League 1996. He was awarded Asian American Engineer of the Year Distinguished Science and Technology Award, CIE-USA, National Engineers Foundation 2007. He addressed the United Nations' General Assembly in 1990 as part of the "Only One Earth Day".

Wang is married to Beverly Feng (馮雪平) with two sons, Kenneth Wang and Eric Wang.

== See also ==
- List of Asian American astronauts
- Ed Lu
- Leroy Chiao
- Yang Liwei
