= Lodewijk van den Berg =

Dutch-born American chemical engineer and astronaut (1932–2022)

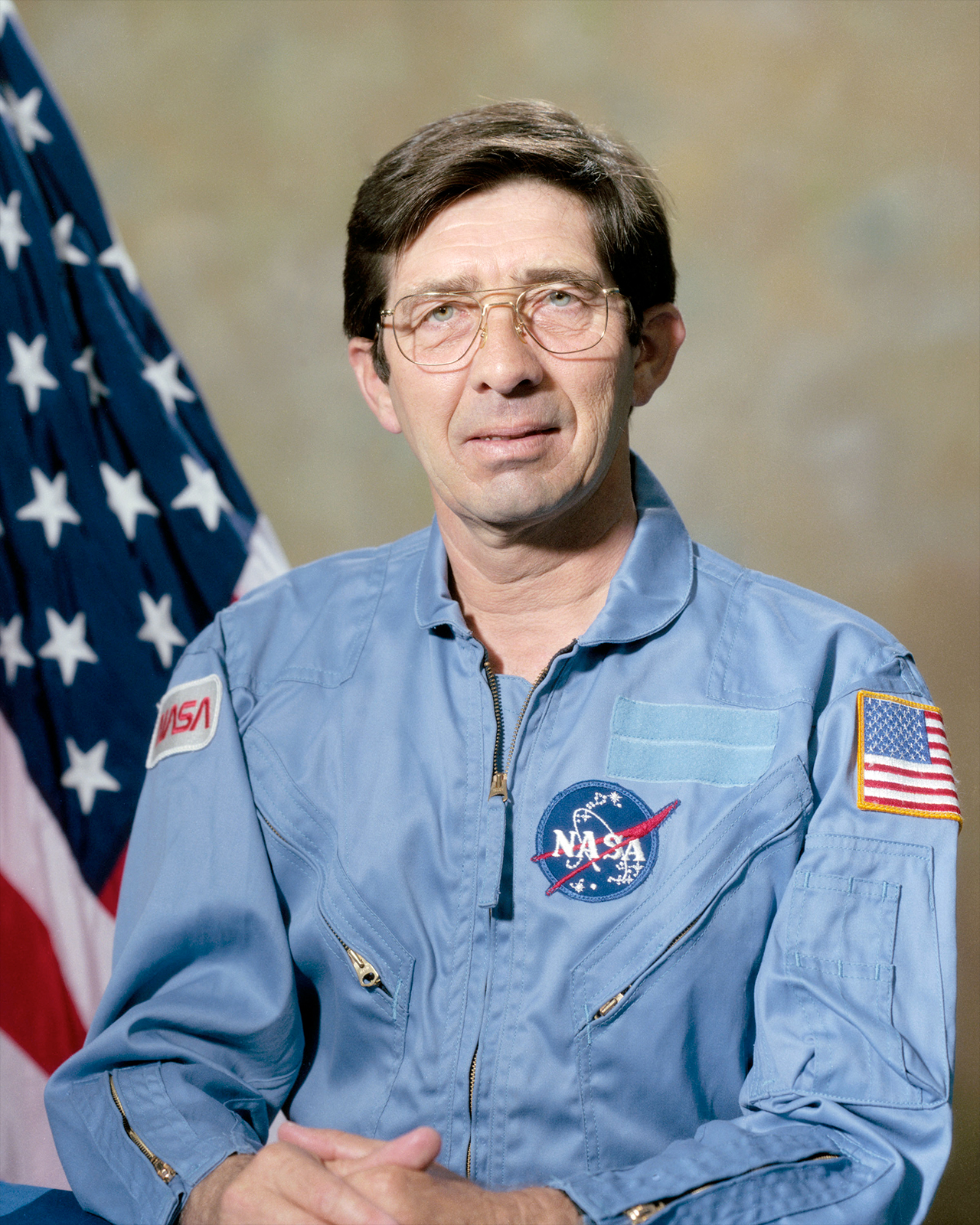
- NASA portrait of Van den Berg in 1985.
- Born: March 24, 1932; Sluiskil, Netherlands
- Died: October 16, 2022 (aged 90)
- Citizenship: Netherlands (1932–1975); United States (1975–2022)
- Education: TU Delft (MSc.Eng.); University of Delaware (MS, PhD)
- Occupation: Chemical engineer
- Space career

EG&G Payload Specialist
- Time in space: 7d 00h 08m
- Missions: STS-51-B
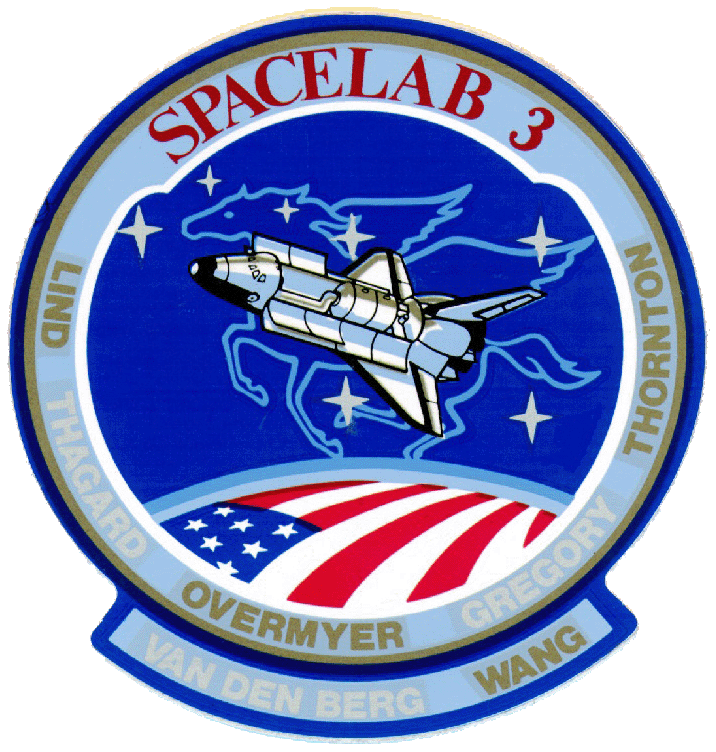
- Mission insignia

Lodewijk van den Berg (Dutch pronunciation: [ˈloːdəʋɛik fɑn də(m) ˈbɛr(ə)x]; (Note: In isolation, van and den are pronounced, respectively, [vɑn] and [dɛn].) March 24, 1932 – October 16, 2022) was a Dutch-born American chemical engineer. He studied crystal growth and flew on a 1985 Space Shuttle Challenger mission as a payload specialist.

Van den Berg was born in the Netherlands and was an astronaut; he was a naturalized American and not a Dutch citizen when he flew on the Challenger. (Note: Van den Berg became a naturalized citizen of the US in 1975. According to Dutch regulations a person automatically loses the Dutch nationality if he voluntarily accepted another nationality before April 1, 2003. Van den Berg has stated that as of 2004 he never verified his Dutch citizenship status.) He was married and had two children. He lived in Florida and worked as a chief scientist at the Constellation Technology Corporation.

== Education and early career ==
Van den Berg was born in Sluiskil, Netherlands. He was educated in the Netherlands and attended the Technical University Delft from 1949 to 1961, where he graduated with an MSc degree in chemical engineering. He then moved to the United States and went to the University of Delaware where he obtained an MSc degree in applied science in 1972 followed by a PhD in applied science in 1975.

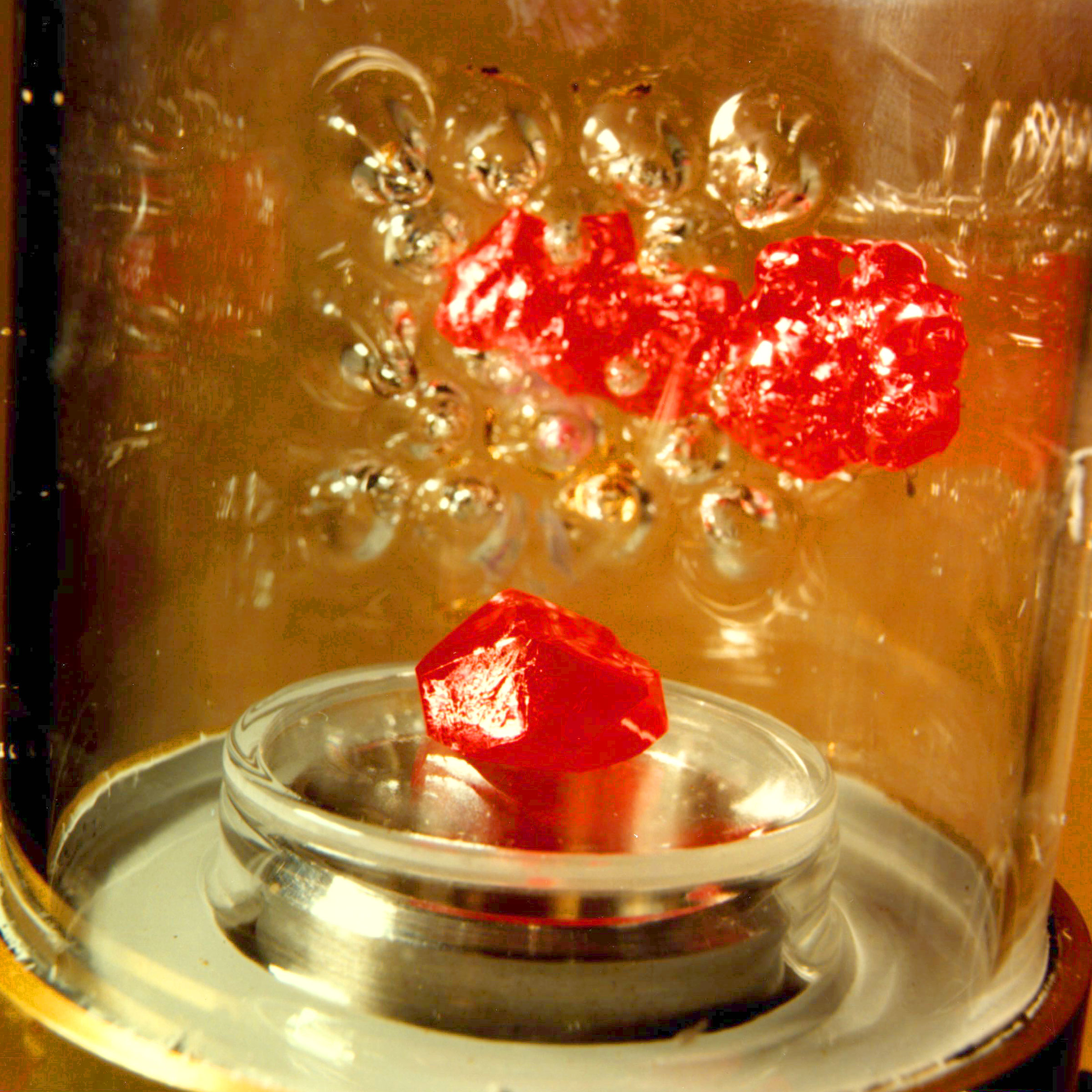
A crystal in the VCGS furnace

He then was offered a job at EG&G Corporation Energy Measurements in Goleta, California, working in crystal growth. EG&G was a defense contractor of the United States government and their business handled sensitive information in the field of science. Van den Berg was required to become a naturalized US citizen and became a US citizen in 1975. Van den Berg worked many years in research and acquired management experience in the preparation of crystalline materials—in particular, the growth of single crystals of chemical compounds, and the investigation of associated defect chemistry and electronic properties. He became an international authority on vapor growth techniques with an emphasis on mercuric iodide crystals and its application in the nuclear industry as gamma ray detectors. While working at EG&G, Van den Berg asked NASA for permission to conduct crystal growth experiments in space and NASA agreed.

== Spaceflight ==
=== Selection ===
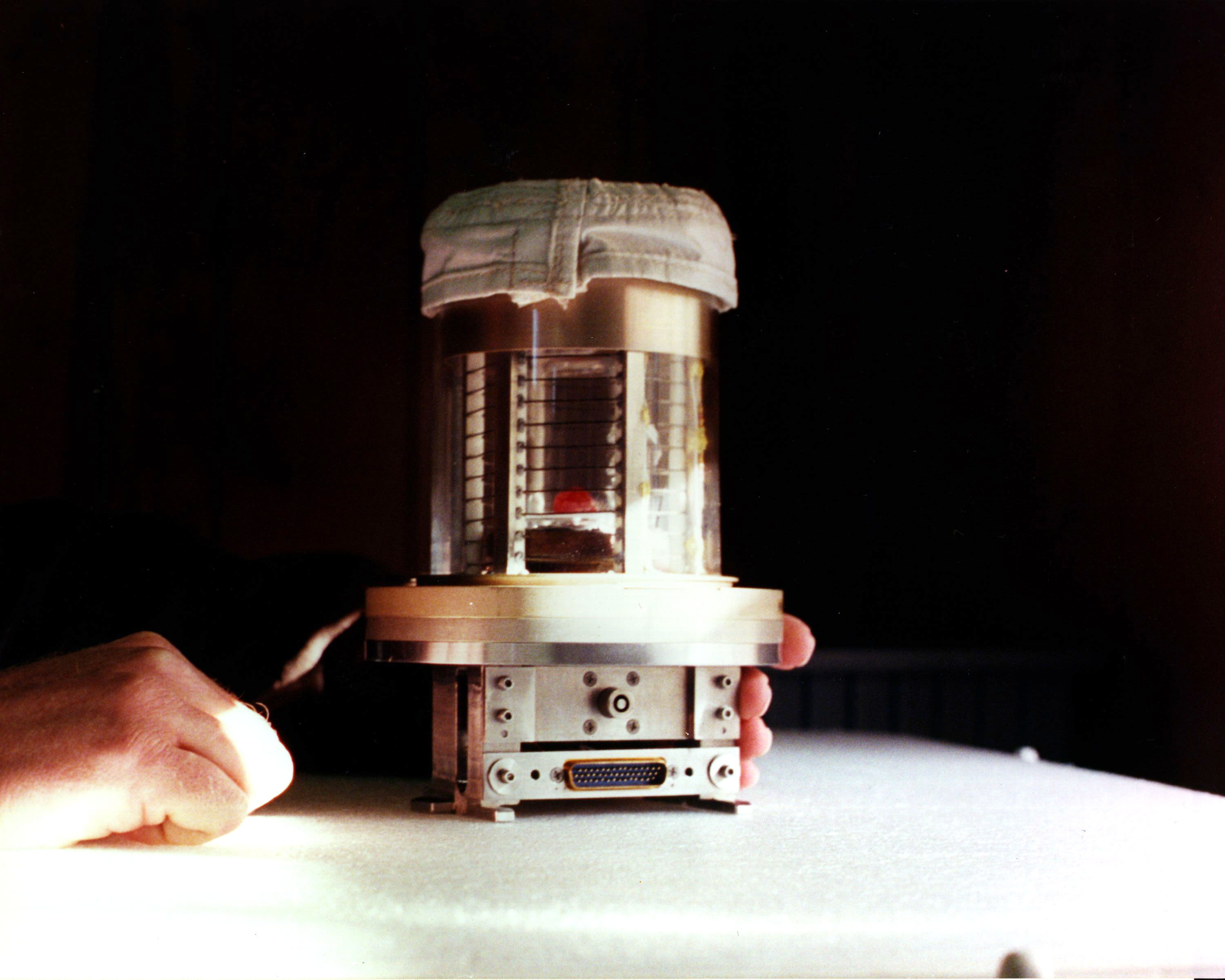
The Vapor Crystal Growth System Furnace experiment of STS-51-B

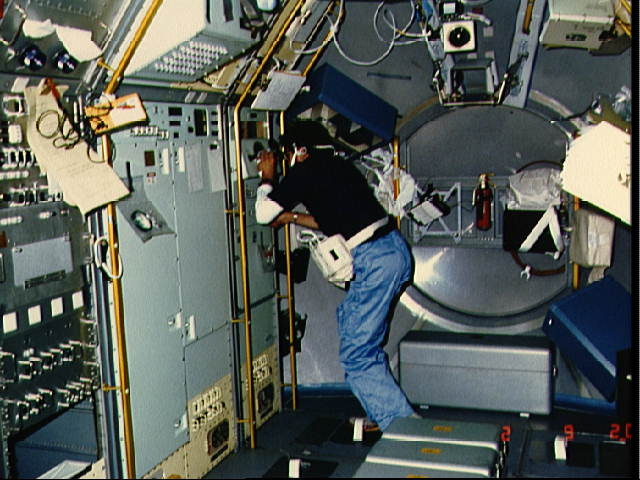
Lodewijk van den Berg observes the crystal growth aboard Spacelab.

Van den Berg and his colleagues designed the EG&G Vapor Crystal Growth System experiment apparatus for a Space Shuttle flight. The experiment required an in-flight operator and NASA decided that it would be easier to train a crystal growth scientist to become an astronaut, than it would be the other way around. NASA asked EG&G and Van den Berg to compile a list of eight people who would qualify to perform the science experiments in space and to become a Payload Specialist. Van den Berg and his chief, Dr. Harold A. Lamonds could only come up with seven names. Lamonds proposed adding Van den Berg to the list, joking with Van den Berg that due to his age, large glasses, and little strength he would probably be dropped during the first selection round; but at least they would have eight names. Van den Berg agreed to be added to the list, but didn't really consider himself being selected to be a realistic scenario.

Van den Berg easily passed the first round of tests. The final four candidates had to pass physical and mental exams while two of the other candidates failed the exams due to possible heart issues. He was now part of the final two; NASA always trains two astronauts, a prime and a back-up. In 1983 he started to train as an astronaut and six months before the launch he was told that he would be the prime astronaut, much to his own surprise. He was 53 years old when he went to space becoming one of the oldest rookie astronauts.

=== STS-51B ===
Van den Berg was a payload specialist on STS-51B Challenger (April 29 – May 6, 1985). STS-51B, the Spacelab-3 mission, was launched from the Kennedy Space Center, Florida, and returned to land at Edwards Air Force Base, California. It was the first operational Spacelab mission. The seven-man crew aboard Challenger conducted experiments in crystal growth, drop dynamics leading to container-less material processing, and atmospheric trace gas spectroscopy. Solar and planetary atmospheric simulation, cosmic rays, and laboratory-animal, and human medical monitoring experiments were performed.

While a co-investigator of the Vapor Crystal Growth System (VCGS) experiment, Van den Berg supervised crystal growth aspects of the VCGS experiment.

During the mission Van den Berg traveled over 2.9 million miles orbiting Earth 110 times and logged more than 168 hours in space.

== Career after NASA ==
After returning to Earth, Van den Berg continued to work on crystal growth experiments at EG&G in California and he became the head of the materials science section. He moved to Florida becoming a chief scientist at the Constellation Technology Corporation. At age 72 he continued to work up to 40 hours a week and grow crystals, a process he compared to gardening. The mercuric iodide crystals he grew are used to make precision detectors for nuclear radiation. The detectors are used in medical applications, by the defense industry, and by the International Atomic Energy Agency.

== Personal life ==
Van den Berg visited the Netherlands every two years, and was the subject of a short 2004 documentary, named The "Forgotten Astronaut", by the tv-show Netwerk on the Dutch public broadcasting channel Nederland 2. In Terneuzen, which is a city five miles from Sluiskil, a secondary school has been named after him, i.e. the Lodewijk College.

Van den Berg died on October 16, 2022, at the age of 90.

== Asteroid ==
On September 28, 2007, a main belt asteroid 11430 (9560 P-L) was named after him; it is now known as 11430 Lodewijkberg. The asteroid was discovered on October 17, 1960, by Cornelis Johannes van Houten and Ingrid van Houten-Groeneveld at Leiden Observatory. They were studying photographic plates taken by Tom Gehrels using the Palomar Observatory's Samuel Oschin telescope.

== Selected academic publications ==
- "Fabrication of mercuric iodide radiation detectors", Lodewijk van den Berg and Ron D. Vigil, Nuclear Instruments and Methods in Physics Research Section A: Accelerators, Spectrometers, Detectors and Associated Equipment, Vol. 458, Iss. 1–2, February 1, 2001, pp. 148–151
- "Improved yield of high resolution mercuric iodide gamma-ray spectrometers", Vernon Gerrish and Lodewijk van den Berg, Nuclear Instruments and Methods in Physics Research Section A: Accelerators, Spectrometers, Detectors and Associated Equipment, Vol. 299, Iss. 1–3, December 20, 1990, pp. 41–44
- "Vapor growth of HgI2 by periodic source or crystal temperature oscillation", by M. Schieber, W.F. Schnepple, L. Van den Berg. Journal of Crystal Growth, Volume 33, Issue 1, April 1976, Pages 125–135
