= STS-51-B =

1985 American crewed spaceflight

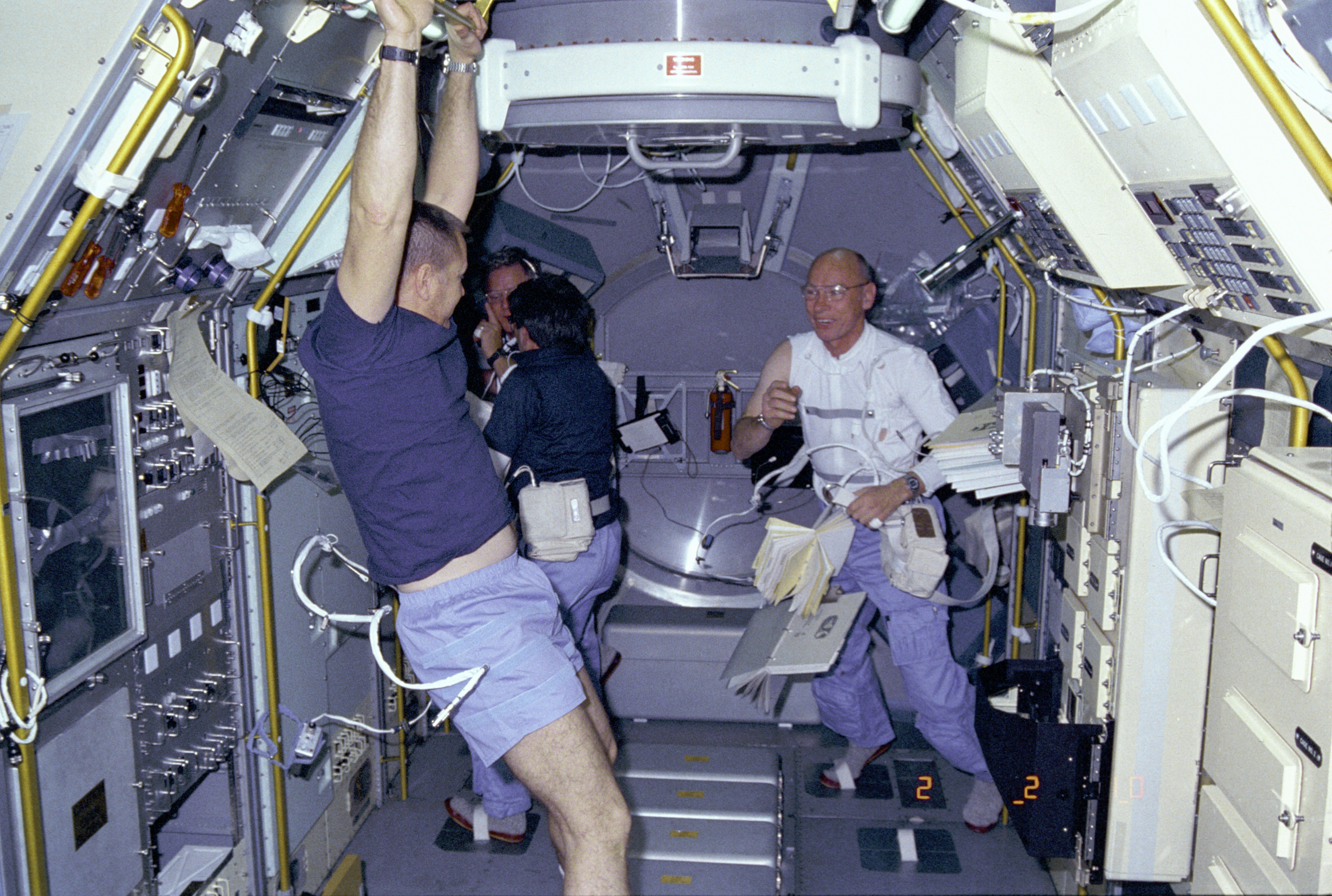
- Overmyer, Lind, Van den Berg, and Thornton in Spacelab Module LM1 during flight
- Names: Space Transportation System-17; Spacelab 3
- Mission type: Microgravity research
- Operator: NASA
- COSPAR ID: 1985-034A
- SATCAT no.: 15665
- Mission duration: 7 days, 8 minutes, 46 seconds
- Distance travelled: 4,651,621 km (2,890,383 mi)
- Orbits completed: 111

Spacecraft properties
- Spacecraft: Space Shuttle Challenger
- Launch mass: 111,980 kg (246,870 lb)
- Landing mass: 96,373 kg (212,466 lb)
- Payload mass: 15,610 kg (34,410 lb)

Crew
- Crew size: 7
- Members: Robert F. Overmyer; Frederick D. Gregory; Don L. Lind; Norman E. Thagard; William E. Thornton; Lodewijk van den Berg; Taylor G. Wang

Start of mission
- Launch date: April 29, 1985, 16:02:18 UTC (12:02:18 pm EDT)
- Launch site: Kennedy, LC-39A
- Contractor: Rockwell International

End of mission
- Landing date: May 6, 1985, 16:11:04 UTC (9:11:04 am PDT)
- Landing site: Edwards, Runway 17

Orbital parameters
- Reference system: Geocentric orbit
- Regime: Low Earth orbit
- Perigee altitude: 346 km (215 mi)
- Apogee altitude: 352 km (219 mi)
- Inclination: 57.00°
- Period: 91.50 minutes
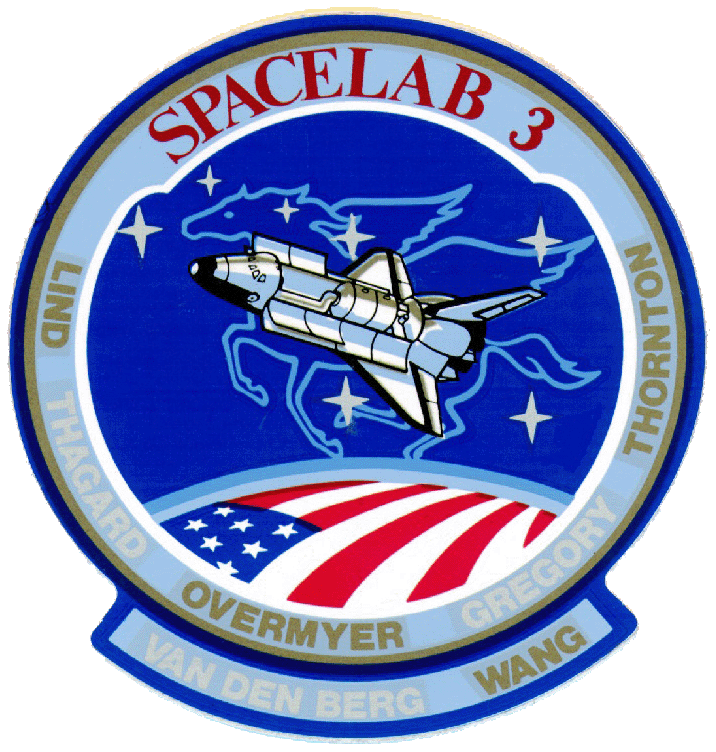
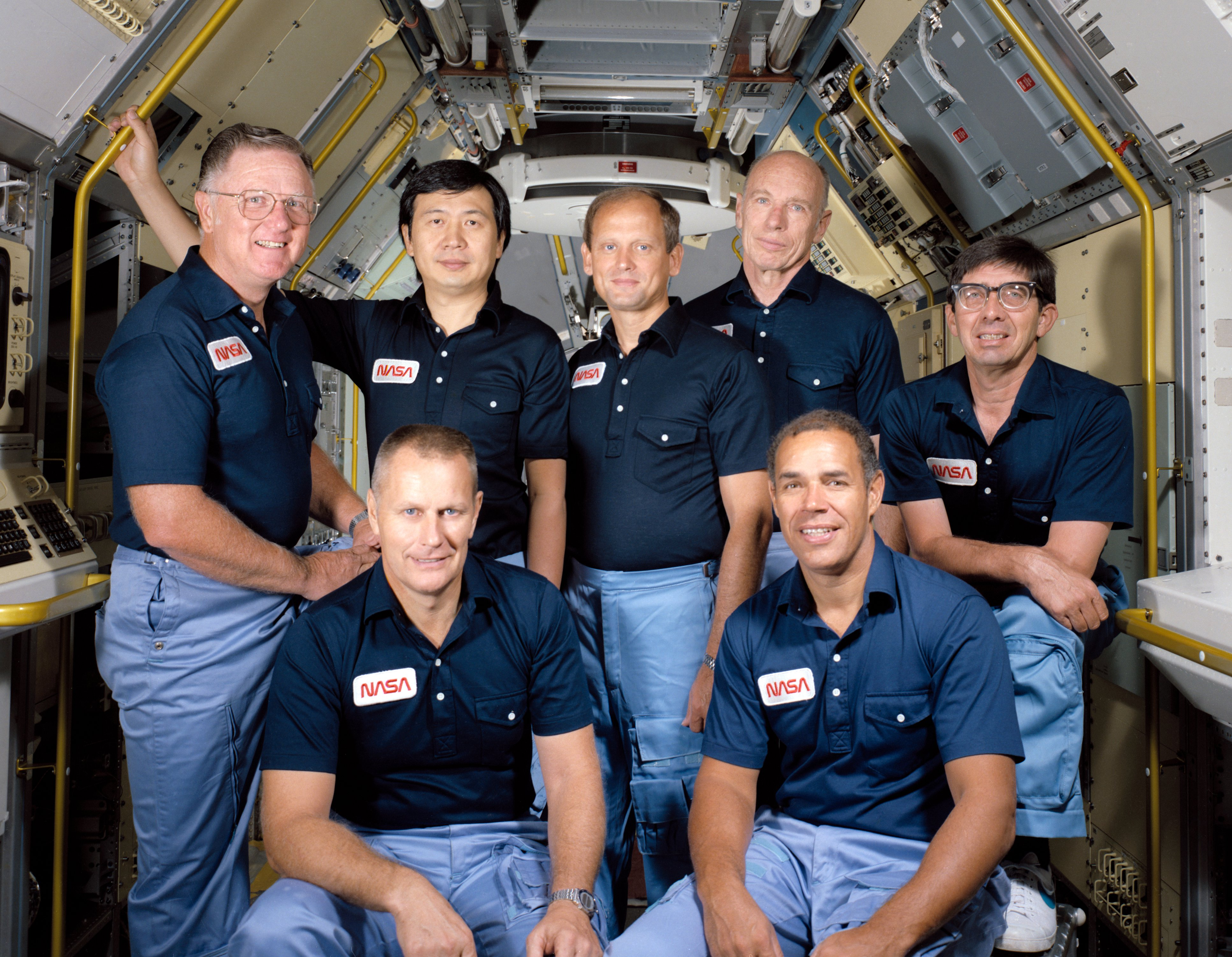
- STS 51-B mission patch Standing: Lind, Wang, Thagard, Thornton and Van den Berg; Sitting: Overmyer and Gregory Space Shuttle program

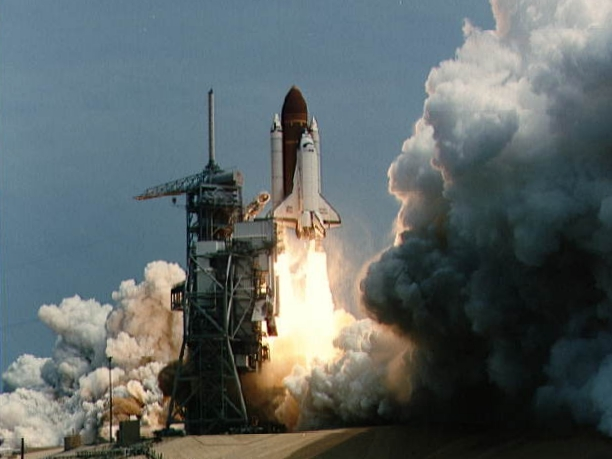
Launch of STS-51-B

STS-51-B was the 17th flight of the NASA Space Shuttle program and the seventh flight of Space Shuttle Challenger. The launch of Challenger on April 29, 1985, was delayed by 2 minutes and 18 seconds, due to a launch processing failure. Challenger was initially rolled out to the pad to launch on the STS-51-E mission. The shuttle was rolled back when a timing issue emerged with the TDRS-B satellite. When STS-51-E was canceled, Challenger was remanifested with the STS-51-B payloads. The shuttle landed successfully on May 6, 1985, after a week-long mission.

== Crew ==
Position	Astronaut
Commander	Robert F. Overmyer; Second and last spaceflight
Pilot	Frederick D. Gregory; First spaceflight
Mission Specialist 1	Don L. Lind; Only spaceflight
Mission Specialist 2 Flight Engineer	Norman E. Thagard; Second spaceflight
Mission Specialist 3	William E. Thornton; Second and last spaceflight
Payload Specialist 1	Lodewijk van den Berg; Only spaceflight EG&G
Payload Specialist 2	Taylor G. Wang; Only spaceflight Jet Propulsion Laboratory
Member of Gold Team; Member of Silver Team

Backup crew
Position	Astronaut
Payload Specialist 1	Mary Helen Johnston
Payload Specialist 2	Eugene H. Trinh

=== Crew seat assignments ===
Seat	Launch	Landing	Seats 1–4 are on the flight deck. Seats 5–7 are on the mid-deck.
1	Overmyer		Seats 1–4 are on the flight deck. Seats 5–7 are on the mid-deck.
2	Gregory		Seats 1–4 are on the flight deck. Seats 5–7 are on the mid-deck.
3	Lind		Seats 1–4 are on the flight deck. Seats 5–7 are on the mid-deck.
4	Thagard		Seats 1–4 are on the flight deck. Seats 5–7 are on the mid-deck.
5	Thornton		Seats 1–4 are on the flight deck. Seats 5–7 are on the mid-deck.
6	van den Berg		Seats 1–4 are on the flight deck. Seats 5–7 are on the mid-deck.
7	Wang		Seats 1–4 are on the flight deck. Seats 5–7 are on the mid-deck.

== Mission insignia ==
The mission insignia features the Challenger with her payload doors open, to show the onboard Spacelab 3. The orbiter rides over the American flag. The seven crewmembers are represented by the 7 stars on the patch, that indirectly refer to the Mercury Seven as a nod to their legacy. Behind the orbiter, the contours of Pegasus can be seen, as a reference to the European Space Agency (ESA). The white board surrounding it all has the appearance of a space suit helmet, with the names of the two respective teams grouped around them on a round band encircling the insignia, and the two mission specialists on an added section below. To further create some sort of contrast, the team colors are reprised for each member's name.

== Mission summary ==
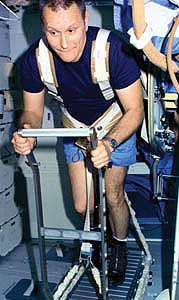
Overmyer using a treadmill on Challenger's middeck.

Challenger lifted off from Kennedy Space Center (KSC)'s launch pad 39A at 12:02:18 p.m. EDT on April 29, 1985. The crew members included Robert F. Overmyer, commander; Frederick D. Gregory, pilot; Don L. Lind, Norman E. Thagard and William E. Thornton, mission specialists; and Lodewijk van den Berg, of EG&G Energy Management, Inc., and Taylor G. Wang, of the Jet Propulsion Laboratory (JPL), both payload specialists. Average age of 48.6 was the oldest for an American space mission. Similar to the previous Spacelab mission (STS-9), the crew was divided roughly in half to cover 12-hour shifts, with Overmyer, Lind, Thornton and Wang forming the Gold team, and Gregory, Thagard and Van den Berg as the Silver team.

STS-51-B was the second flight of the European Space Agency (ESA)'s Spacelab pressurized module, and the first with the Spacelab module in a fully operational configuration. Spacelab's capabilities for multi-disciplinary research in microgravity were successfully demonstrated. The gravity gradient attitude of the orbiter proved quite stable, allowing the delicate experiments in materials processing and fluid mechanics to proceed normally. The crew operated around the clock in two 12-hour shifts. Two squirrel monkeys and 24 rats were flown in special cages, the second time American astronauts flew live non-human mammals aboard the shuttle. The crew members in orbit were supported 24 hours a day by a temporary Payload Operations Control Center, located at the Johnson Space Center.

An experiment designed by Taylor Wang malfunctioned upon activation. Wang, feeling immense pressure, received permission to attempt a fix and was successful in repairing the experiment, though remarks made by him caused concern for the safety of the crew and the mission. The incident was covered in an Ars Technica article on 22 January 2024. There, John Fabian, mission specialist on STS-51-G, the very next shuttle flight after 51-B, was cited to explain why a lock was recently installed on the door of the side hatch: "It was installed when we got into orbit so that the door could not be opened from the inside and commit hara-kiri, kill the whole crew. That was not because of anybody we had on our flight but because of a concern about someone who had flown before 51-G."

On the mission, Spacelab carried 15 primary experiments, of which 14 were successfully performed. Two Getaway Special (GAS) experiments required that they be deployed from their canisters, a first for the program. These were NUSAT (Northern Utah Satellite) and GLOMR (Global Low Orbiting Message Relay satellite). NUSAT deployed successfully, but GLOMR did not deploy, and was returned to Earth.

A Cosmic Ray Experiment by Indian Space Research Organisation, named Anuradha was launched onboard the mission. It measured the ionization states of low energy cosmic rays in near-earth space. It consisted of a Barrel shaped recorder consisting of plastic sheets. It detected cosmic rays at the rate of seven a minute for 64 hours and produced 10000 sheets of data

Challenger landed safely at Edwards Air Force Base at 12:11:04 p.m. EDT on May 6, 1985, after a mission lasting 7 days, 8 minutes, and 46 seconds.

== Connection to the Challenger disaster ==
While participating in the investigation into the destruction of Challenger during STS-51L in 1986, Overmyer discovered that a problem with the shuttle's O-rings, similar to that which led to the disaster, had emerged during the launch of STS-51B. Morton-Thiokol engineers told Lind after the mission that "you came within three-tenths of one second of dying". It was the problem with the O-rings on the left solid rocket motor (SRM) on this launch (SRM-16A) that prompted Roger Boisjoly to write a memo to Bob Lund about the potential for the O-rings to cause catastrophic failure.

== See also ==
- List of human spaceflights
- List of Space Shuttle missions
