= Shirt-sleeve environment =

Term in aircraft design

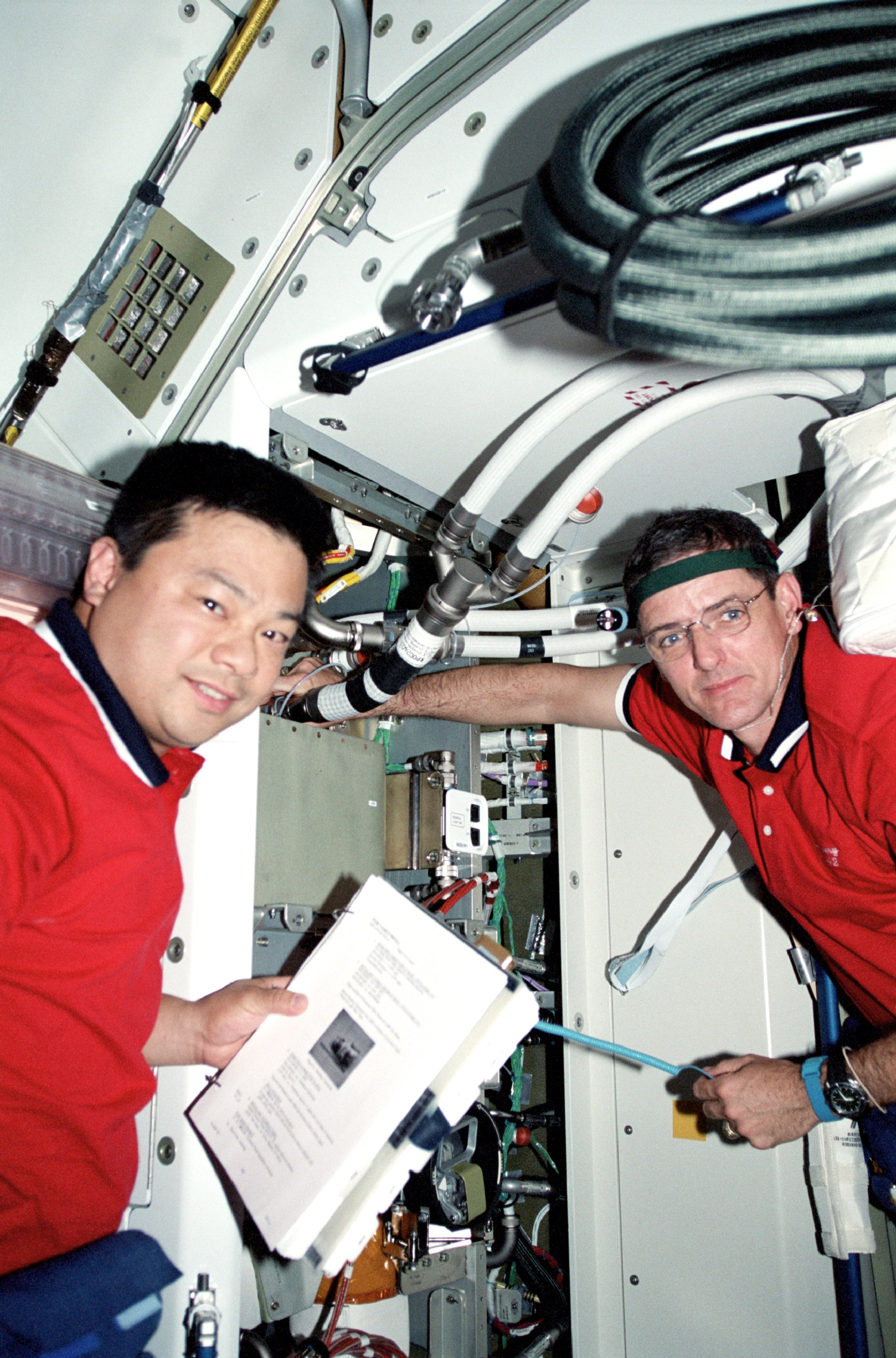
Astronauts Leroy Chiao (left) and William McArthur, who earlier shared space walk time to work on the exterior of the International Space Station (ISS), are pictured here in the shirt-sleeve environment of the Functional Cargo Block (FGB) on the station. The two mission specialists were in the process of changing out the Y-cable in the FGB.

"Shirt-sleeve environment" is a term used in aircraft design to describe the interior of an aircraft in which no special clothing need be worn. Early aircraft had no internal pressurization, so the crews of those that reached the stratosphere had to be garbed to withstand the low temperature and pressure of the air outside. Respirator masks needed to cover the mouth and nose. Silk socks were worn to retain heat. Sometimes leather clothing, such as boots, were electrically heated. When jet fighter aircraft reached still higher altitudes, something similar to a space suit had to be worn, and pilots of the highest reconnaissance aircraft wore real space suits.

Commercial jet airliners fly in the stratosphere, but because they are pressurized, they could be said to have a shirt-sleeve environment. Crews of the US Apollo spacecraft always began the flight phases of launch, docking, and re-entry in space suits, although they could remove them for many hours. The Soviets tried to perfect this to save weight. This worked well, until an accidental depressurization on entry resulted in the deaths of an entire Soyuz crew. Protocols were changed shortly thereafter to require at least partial spacesuits. Early Soyuz spacecraft had no provision for space suits in the re-entry module, although the orbital module was intended for use as an airlock. Thus these operated in a shirt-sleeve environment except for spacewalks.

This term is also used in science fiction to describe an alien planet with an atmosphere breathable by humans without special equipment.

The Space Shuttle's Spacelab Habitable module was an area with expanded volume for astronauts to work in a shirt sleeve environment and had space for equipment racks and related support equipment for operations in Low Earth orbit.

One of the goals for MOLAB rover was to achieve a shirt-sleeve environment (compared to the Lunar Roving Vehicle which was open to space and required the use of space suits to operate). One of the considerations was the habitable volume that could be occupied.
