= Spacelab =

Temporary, reusable laboratory aboard the Space Shuttle

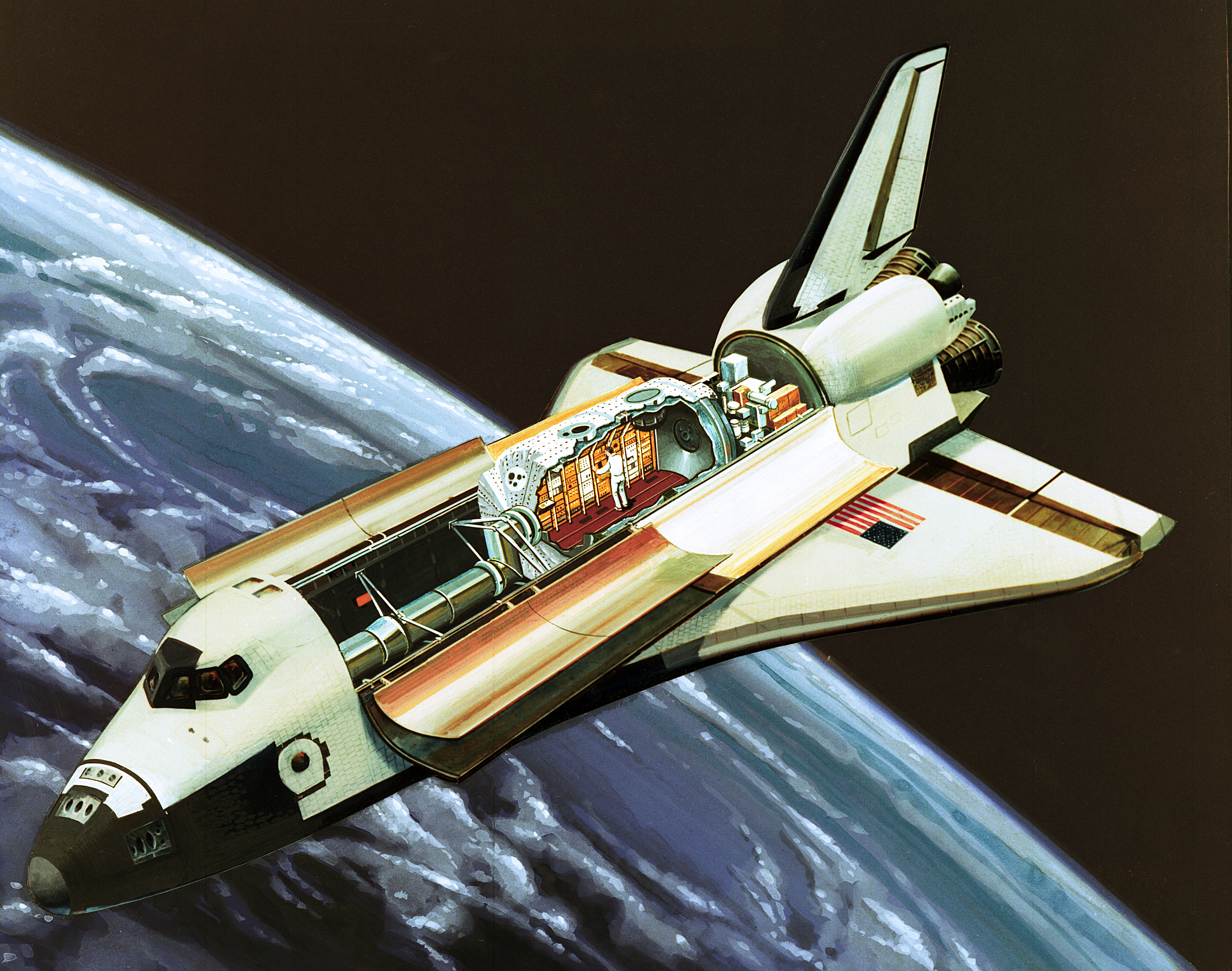
Spacelab art, with lab interior cutaway, 1981

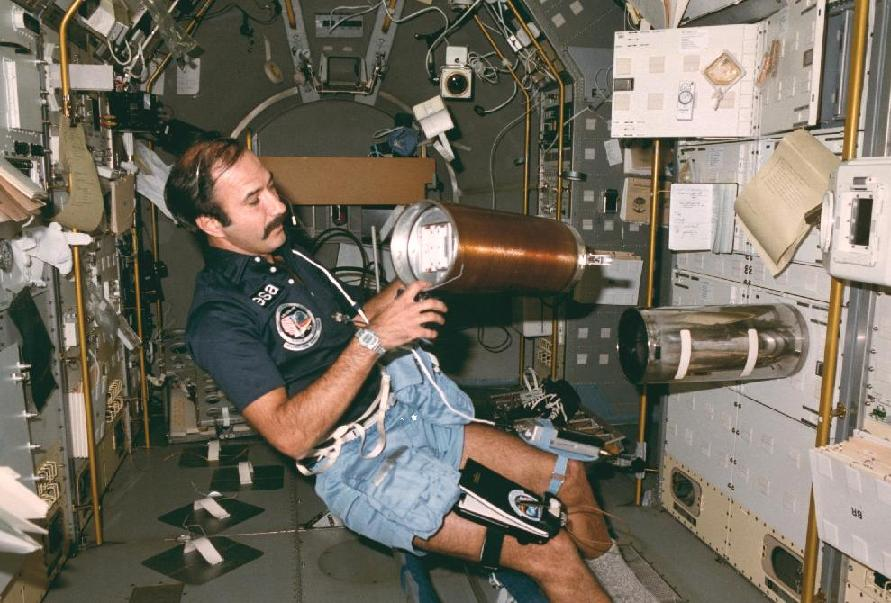
Wubbo Ockels in the lab, 1985

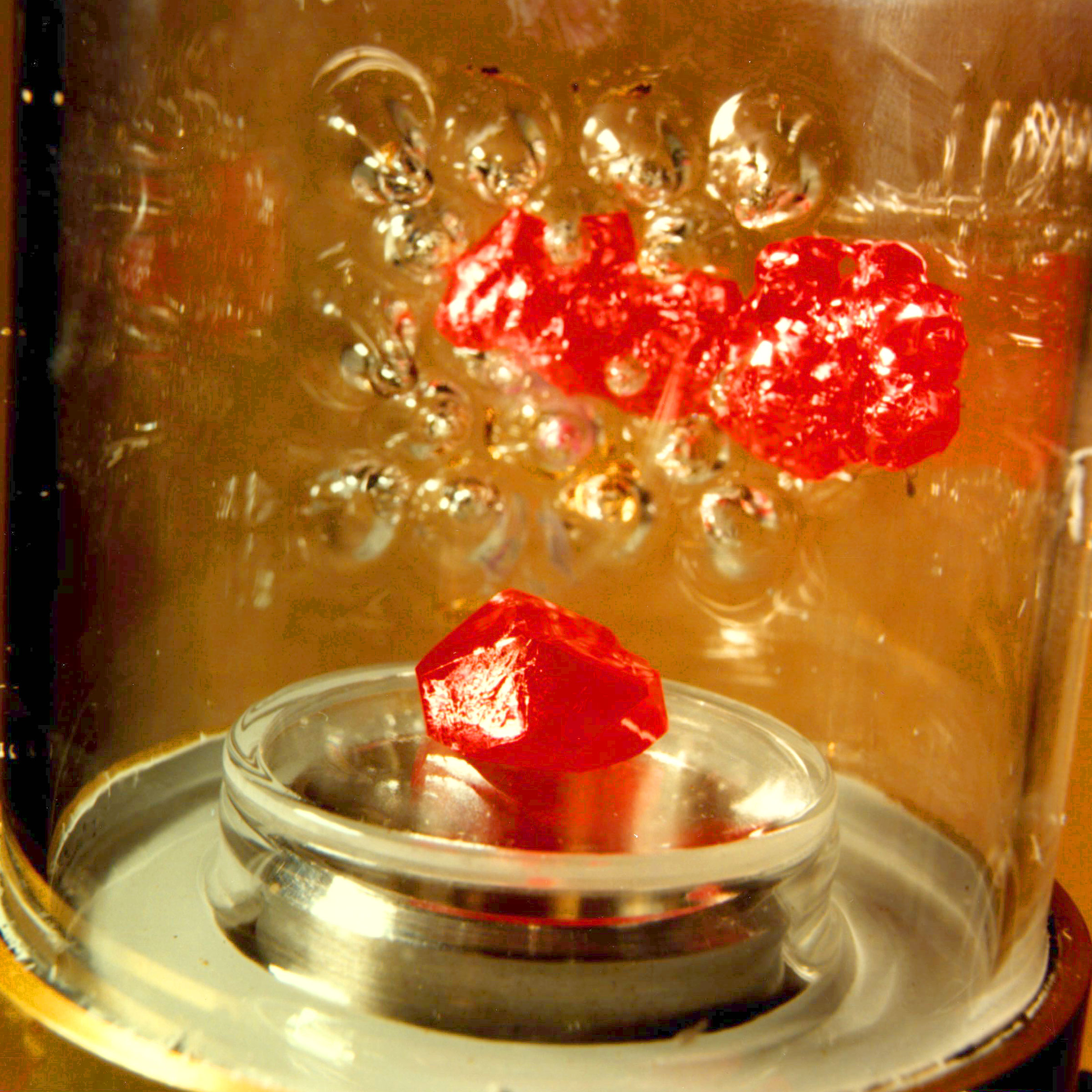
Mercuric iodide crystals grown on Spacelab 3

Spacelab was a reusable laboratory developed by the European Space Agency (ESA) and used on certain spaceflights flown by the Space Shuttle. The laboratory comprised multiple components, including a pressurized module, an unpressurized carrier, and other related hardware housed in the Shuttle's cargo bay. The components were arranged in various configurations to meet the needs of each spaceflight.

Spacelab components flew on a total of about 32 Shuttle missions, depending on how such hardware and missions are tabulated. Spacelab allowed scientists to perform experiments in microgravity in geocentric orbit. There was a variety of Spacelab-associated hardware, so a distinction can be made between the major Spacelab program missions with European scientists running missions in the Spacelab habitable module, missions running other Spacelab hardware experiments, and other Space Transportation System (STS) missions that used some component of Spacelab hardware. There is some variation in counts of Spacelab missions, in part because there were different types of Spacelab missions with a large range in the amount of Spacelab hardware flown and the nature of each mission. There were at least 22 major Spacelab missions between 1983 and 1998, and Spacelab hardware was used on a number of other missions, with some of the Spacelab pallets being flown as late as 2008.

== Background and history ==
In August 1973, NASA and European Space Research Organisation (ESRO), now European Space Agency or ESA, signed a memorandum of understanding (MOU) to build a science laboratory for use on Space Shuttle flights. Construction of Spacelab was started in 1974 by Entwicklungsring Nord (ERNO), a subsidiary of VFW-Fokker GmbH, after merger with Messerschmitt-Bölkow-Blohm (MBB) named MBB/ERNO, and merged into EADS SPACE Transportation in 2003. The first lab module, LM1, was donated to NASA in exchange for flight opportunities for European astronauts. A second module, LM2, was bought by NASA for its own use from ERNO.

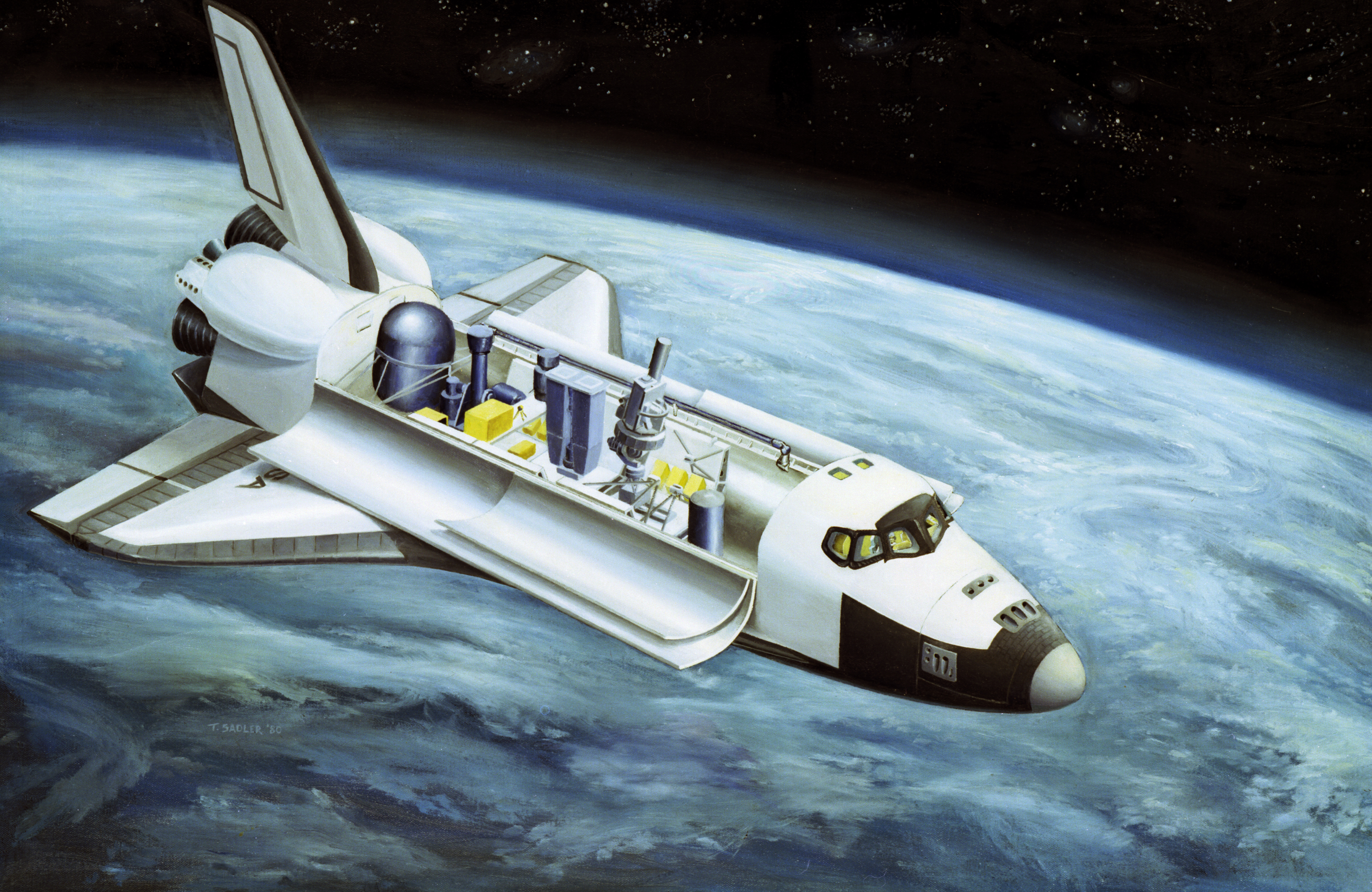
Artist's impression of the Spacelab 2 mission, showing some of the various experiments in the payload bay

Construction on the Spacelab modules began in 1974 by what was then the company ERNO-VFW-Fokker.

Spacelab is important to all of us for at least four good reasons. It expanded the Shuttle's ability to conduct science on-orbit manyfold. It provided a marvelous opportunity and example of a large international joint venture involving government, industry, and science with our European allies. The European effort provided the free world with a really versatile laboratory system several years before it would have been possible if the United States had had to fund it on its own. And finally, it provided Europe with the systems development and management experience they needed to move into the exclusive manned space flight arena.

— NASA Administrator, Spacelab: An International Success Story

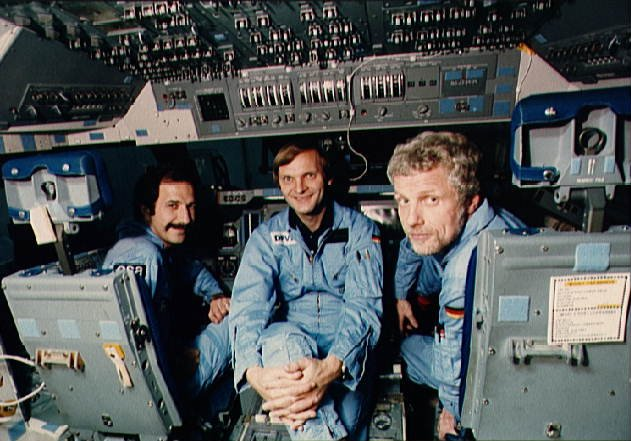
European astronauts prepare for their Spacelab mission, 1984.

In the early 1970s NASA shifted its focus from the Lunar missions to the Space Shuttle, and also space research. The administrator of NASA at the time moved the focus from a new space station to a space laboratory for the planned Space Shuttle. This would allow technologies for future space stations to be researched and harness the capabilities of the Space Shuttle for research.

Spacelab was produced by European Space Research Organisation (ESRO), a consortium of ten European countries including:

- Austria
- Belgium
- Denmark
- France
- West Germany/Germany
- Italy
- Netherlands
- Spain
- Switzerland
- United Kingdom

== Components ==
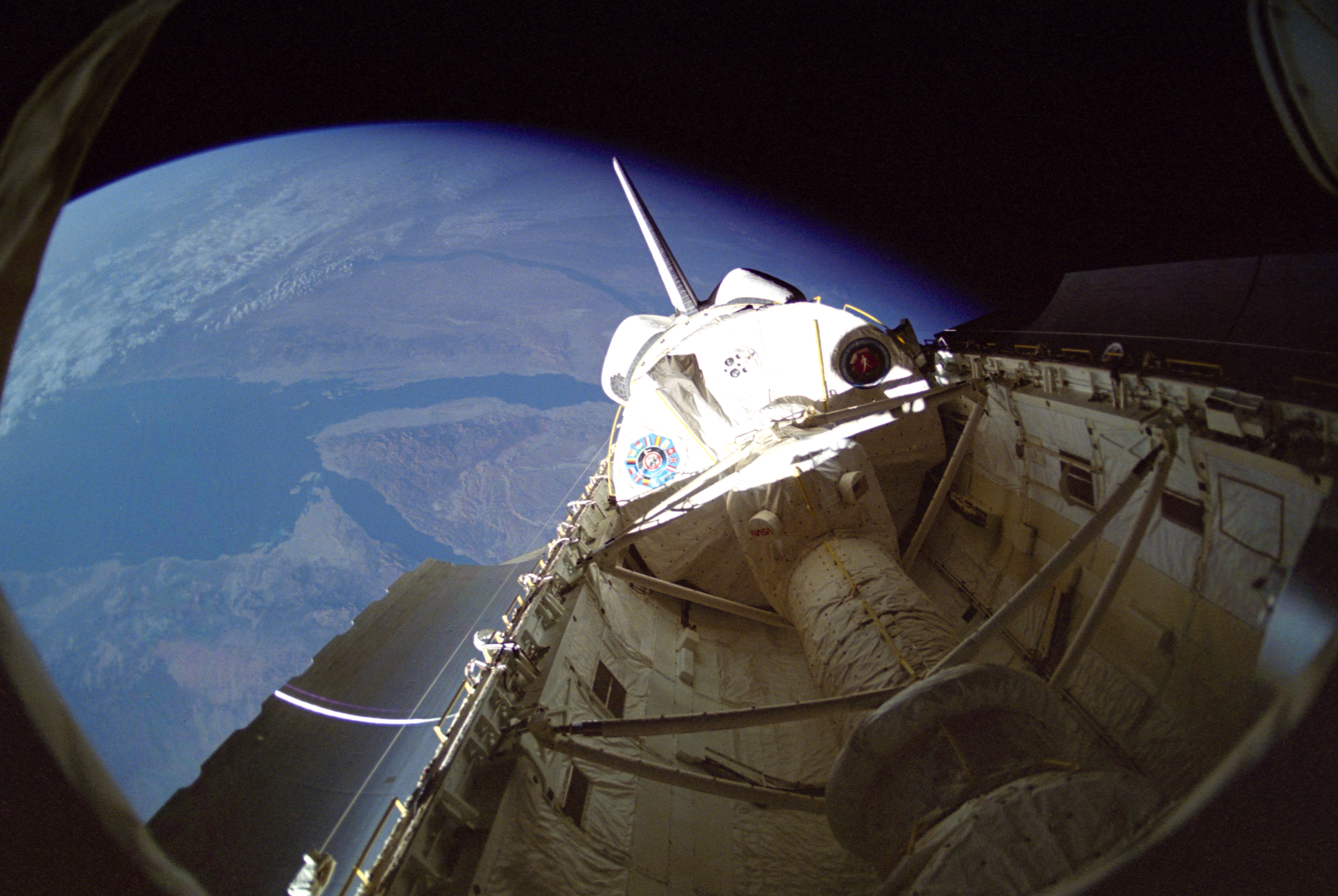
STS-42 with Spacelab hardware in the orbiter bay overlooking Earth

In addition to the laboratory module, the complete set also included five external pallets for experiments in vacuum built by British Aerospace (BAe) and a pressurized "Igloo" containing the subsystems needed for the pallet-only flight configuration operation. Eight flight configurations were qualified, though more could be assembled if needed.

The system had some unique features including an intended two-week turn-around time (for the original Space Shuttle launch turn-around time) and the roll-on-roll-off for loading in aircraft (Earth-transportation).

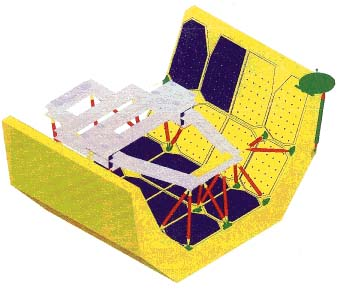
Diagram of Spacelab pallet module

Spacelab consisted of a variety of interchangeable components, with the major one being a crewed laboratory that could be flown in the Space Shuttle orbiter's bay and returned to Earth. However, the habitable module did not have to be flown to conduct a Spacelab-type mission and there was a variety of pallets and other hardware supporting space research. The habitable module expanded the volume for astronauts to work in a shirt-sleeve environment and had space for equipment racks and related support equipment. When the habitable module was not used, some of the support equipment for the pallets could instead be housed in the smaller Igloo, a pressurized cylinder connected to the Space Shuttle orbiter crew area.

Spacelab missions typically supported multiple experiments, and the Spacelab 1 mission had experiments in the fields of space plasma physics, solar physics, atmospheric physics, astronomy, and Earth observation. The selection of appropriate modules was part of mission planning for Spacelab Shuttle missions, and for example, a mission might need less habitable space and more pallets, or vice versa.

=== Habitable module ===
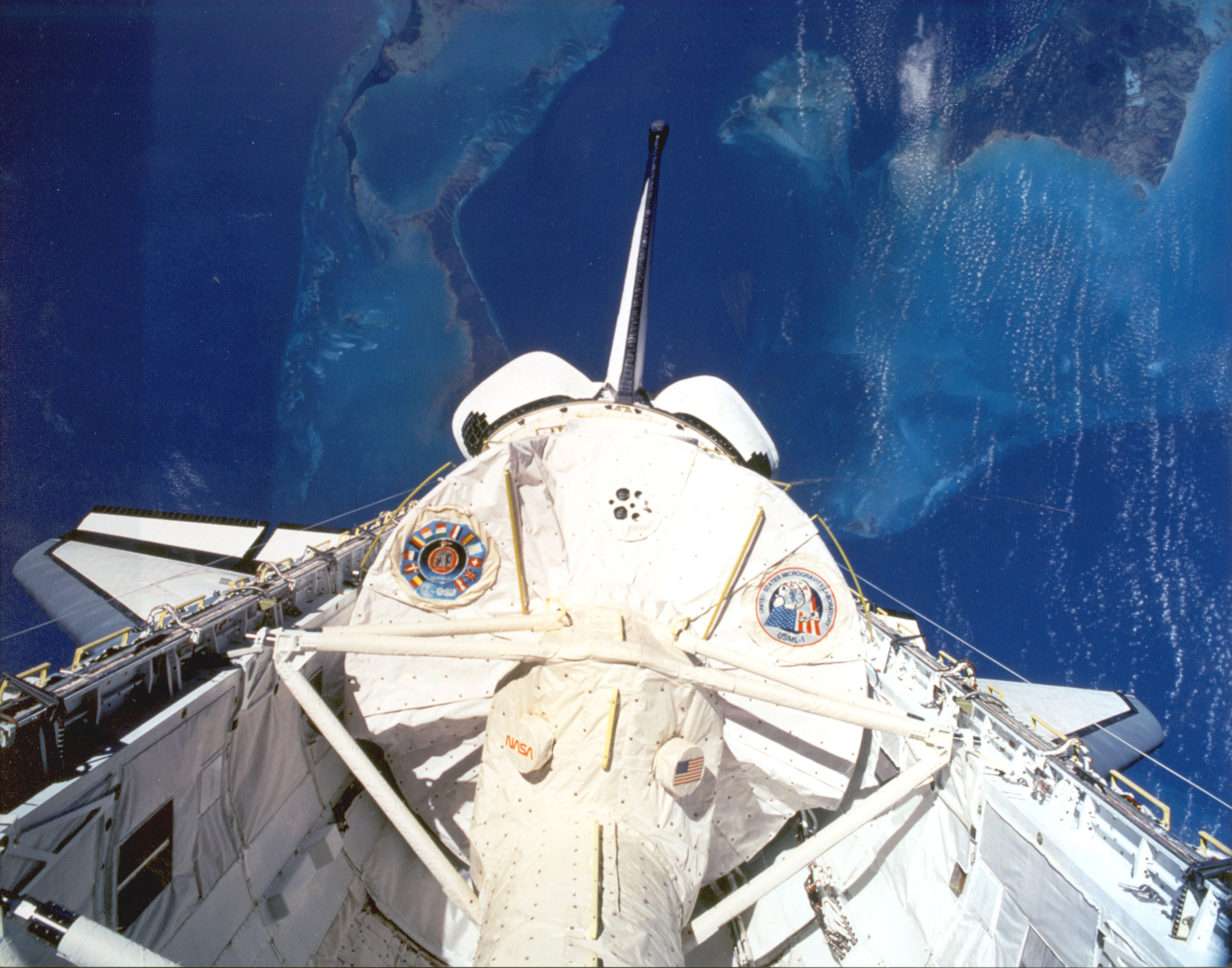
Shuttle Columbia during STS-50 with Spacelab Module LM1 and tunnel in its cargo bay

The habitable Spacelab laboratory module comprised a cylindrical environment in the rear of the Space Shuttle orbiter payload bay, connected to the orbiter crew compartment by a tunnel. The laboratory had an outer diameter of 4.12 m (13.5 ft), and each segment a length of 2.7 m (8 ft 10 in). The laboratory module consisted at minimum of a core segment, which could be used alone in a short module configuration. The long module configuration included an additional experiment segment. It was also possible to operate Spacelab experiments from the orbiter's aft flight deck.

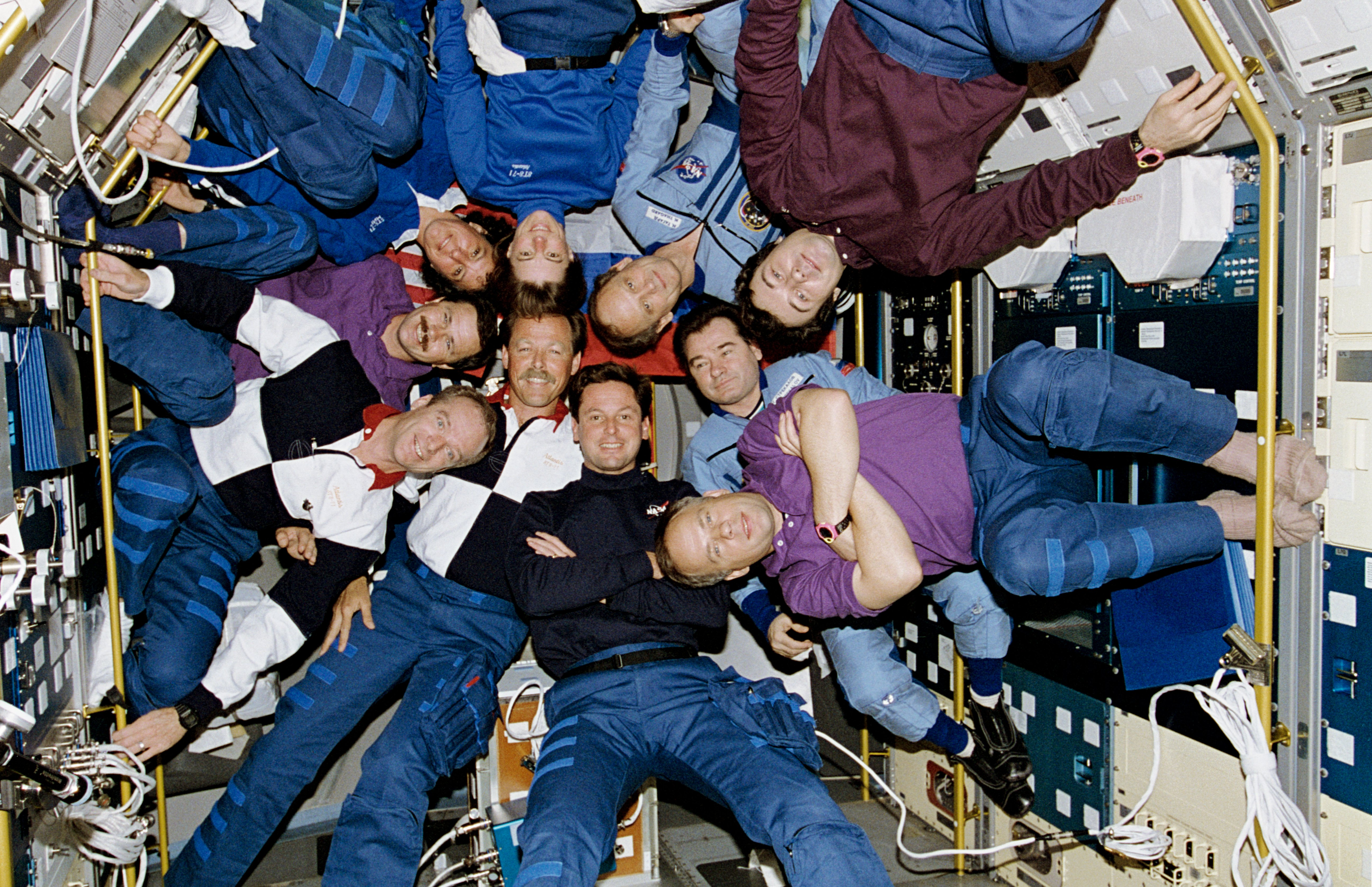
Ten people inside the Spacelab Module in June 1995, celebrating the docking of the Space Shuttle and Mir

The pressurized tunnel had its connection point at the orbiter's mid-deck. There were two different length tunnels depending on the location of the habitable module in the payload bay. When the laboratory module was not used, but additional space was needed for support equipment, another structure called the Igloo could be used.

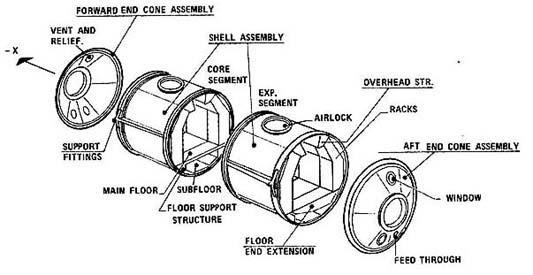
Spacelab long module configuration

Two laboratory modules were built, identified as LM1 and LM2. LM1 is on display at the Steven F. Udvar-Hazy Center at the Smithsonian Air and Space Museum behind the Space Shuttle Discovery. LM2 was on display in the Bremenhalle exhibition in the Bremen Airport of Bremen, Germany from 2000 to 2010. It resides in building 4c at the nearby Airbus Defence and Space plant since 2010 and can only be viewed during guided tours.

=== Pallet ===
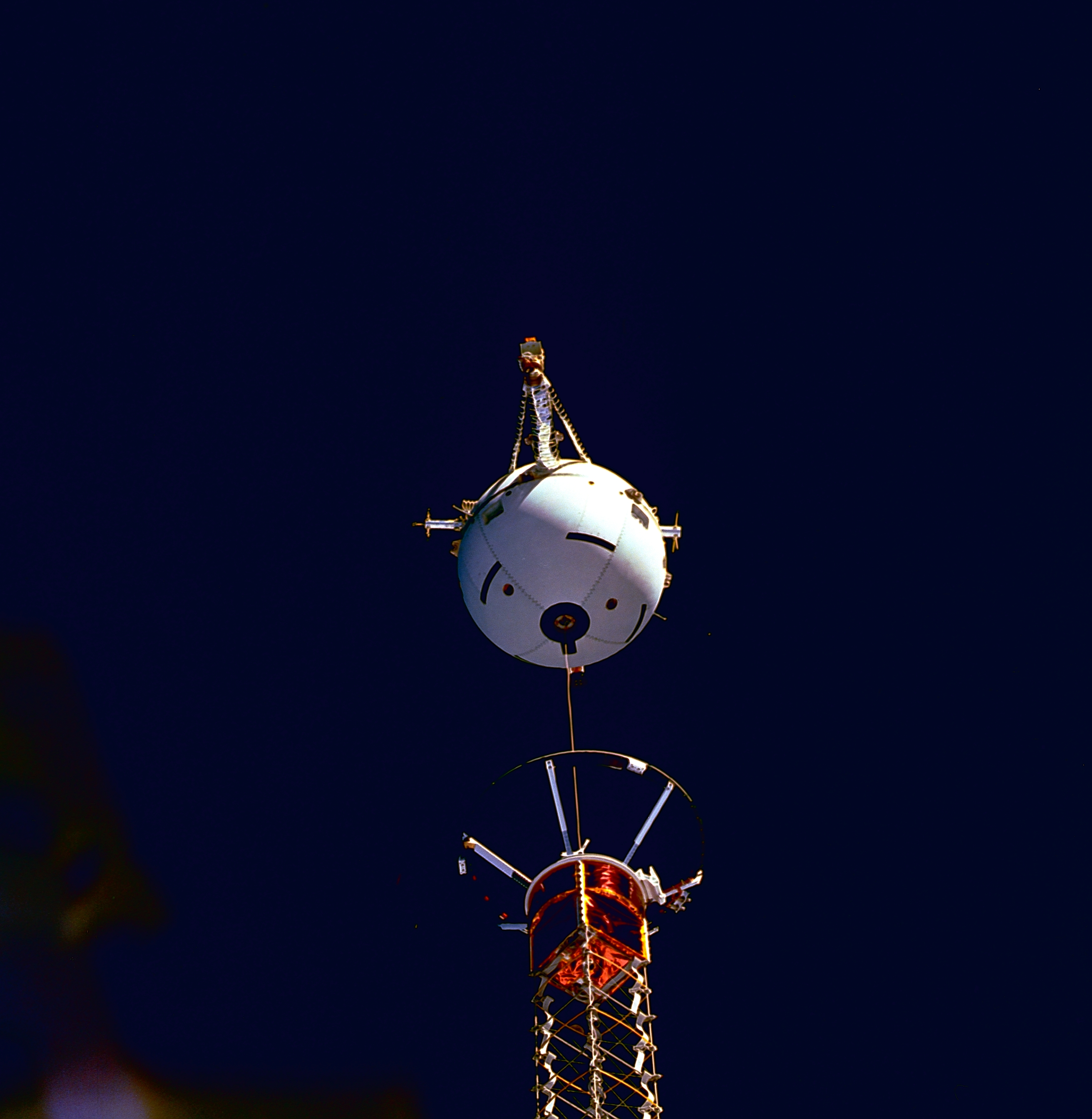
Tethered Satellite System deployment, deployed from Spacelab pallet

The Spacelab Pallet is a U-shaped platform for mounting instrumentation, large instruments, experiments requiring exposure to space, and instruments requiring a large field of view, such as telescopes. The pallet has several hard points for mounting heavy equipment. The pallet can be used in single configuration or stacked end to end in double or triple configurations. Up to five pallets can be configured in the Space Shuttle cargo bay by using a double pallet plus triple pallet configurations.

The Spacelab Pallet used to transport both Canadarm2 and Dextre to the International Space Station is currently at the Canada Aviation and Space Museum, on loan from NASA through the Canadian Space Agency (CSA).

A Spacelab Pallet was transferred to the Swiss Museum of Transport for permanent display on 5 March 2010. The Pallet, nicknamed Elvis, was used during the eight-day STS-46 mission, 31 July – 8 August 1992, when ESA astronaut Claude Nicollier was on board Space Shuttle Atlantis to deploy ESA's European Retrievable Carrier (Eureca) scientific mission and the joint NASA/ASI (Italian Space Agency) Tethered Satellite System (TSS-1). The Pallet carried TSS-1 in the Shuttle's cargo bay.

Another Spacelab Pallet is on display at the U.S. National Air and Space Museum in Washington, D.C. There was a total of ten space-flown Spacelab pallets.

=== Igloo ===
On spaceflights where a habitable module was not flown, but pallets were flown, a pressurized cylinder known as the Igloo carried the subsystems needed to operate the Spacelab equipment. The Igloo was 3 m (9.8 ft) tall, had a diameter of 1.5 m (4 ft 11 in), and weighed 1,100 kg (2,400 lb). Two Igloo units were manufactured, both by Belgian company SABCA, and both were used on spaceflights. An Igloo component was flown on Spacelab 2, ASTRO-1, ATLAS-1, ATLAS-2, ATLAS-3, and ASTRO-2.

A Spacelab Igloo is on display at the James S. McDonnell Space Hangar at the Steven F. Udvar-Hazy Center in the US.

=== Instrument Pointing System ===
The IPS was a gimbaled pointing device, capable of aiming telescopes, cameras, or other instruments. IPS was used on three different Space Shuttle missions between 1985 and 1995. IPS was manufactured by Dornier, and two units were made. The IPS was primarily constructed out of aluminum, steel, and multi-layer insulation.

IPS would be mounted inside the payload bay of the Space Shuttle Orbiter, and could provide gimbaled 3-axis pointing. It was designed for a pointing accuracy of less than 1 arcsecond (a unit of degree), and three pointing modes including Earth, Sun, and Stellar focused modes. The IPS was mounted on a pallet exposed to outer space in the payload bay.

IPS missions:

- Spacelab 2, a.k.a. STS-51-F launched 1985
- Astro-1, a.k.a. STS-35 launched in 1990
- Astro-2, a.k.a. STS-67 launched in 1995

The Spacelab 2 mission flew the Infrared Telescope (IRT), which was a 15.2 cm (6.0 in) aperture helium-cooled infrared telescope, observing light between wavelengths of 1.7 to 118 μm. IRT collected infrared data on 60% of the galactic plane.

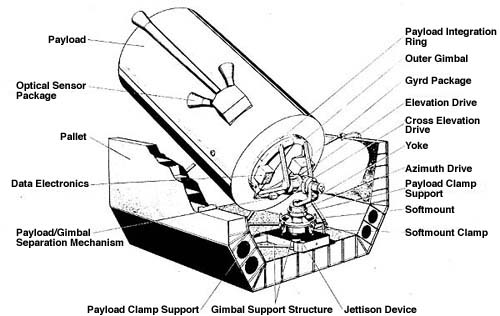
Instrument Pointing System (IPS)

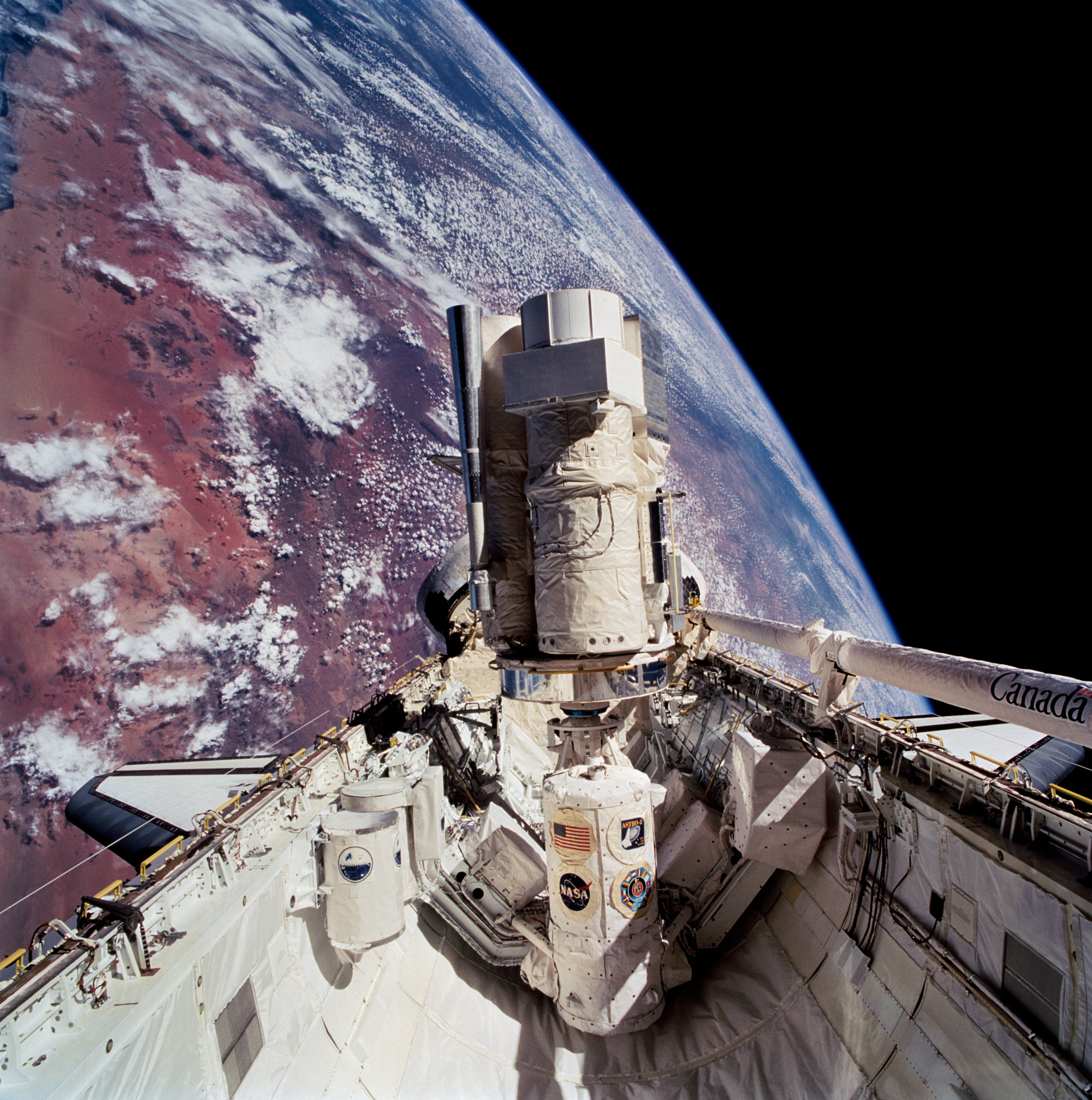
IPS at work above the sky on Astro-2, 1995

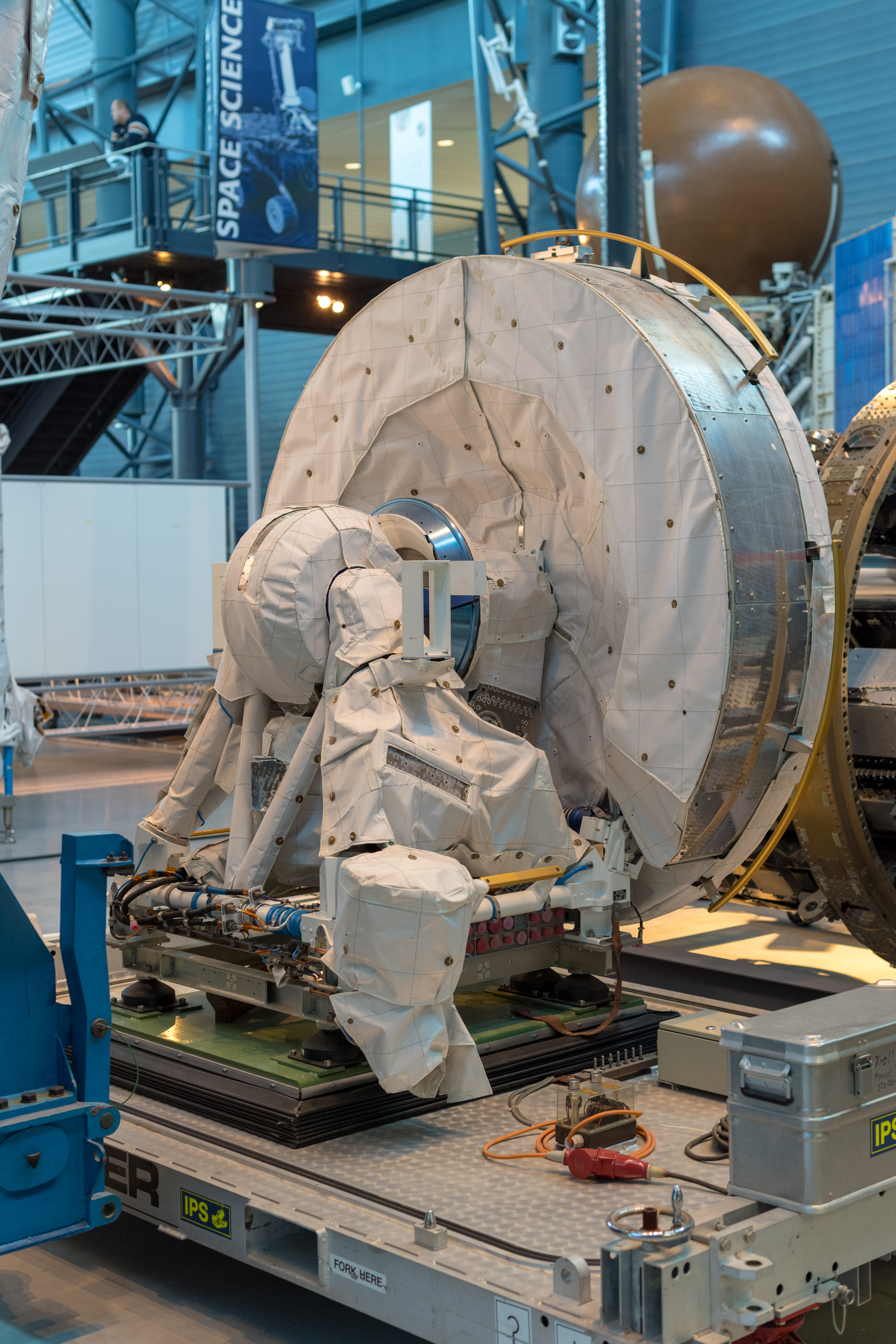
Dornier Instrument Pointing System at the Smithsonian Museum (Udvar Hazy Center)

=== List of parts ===
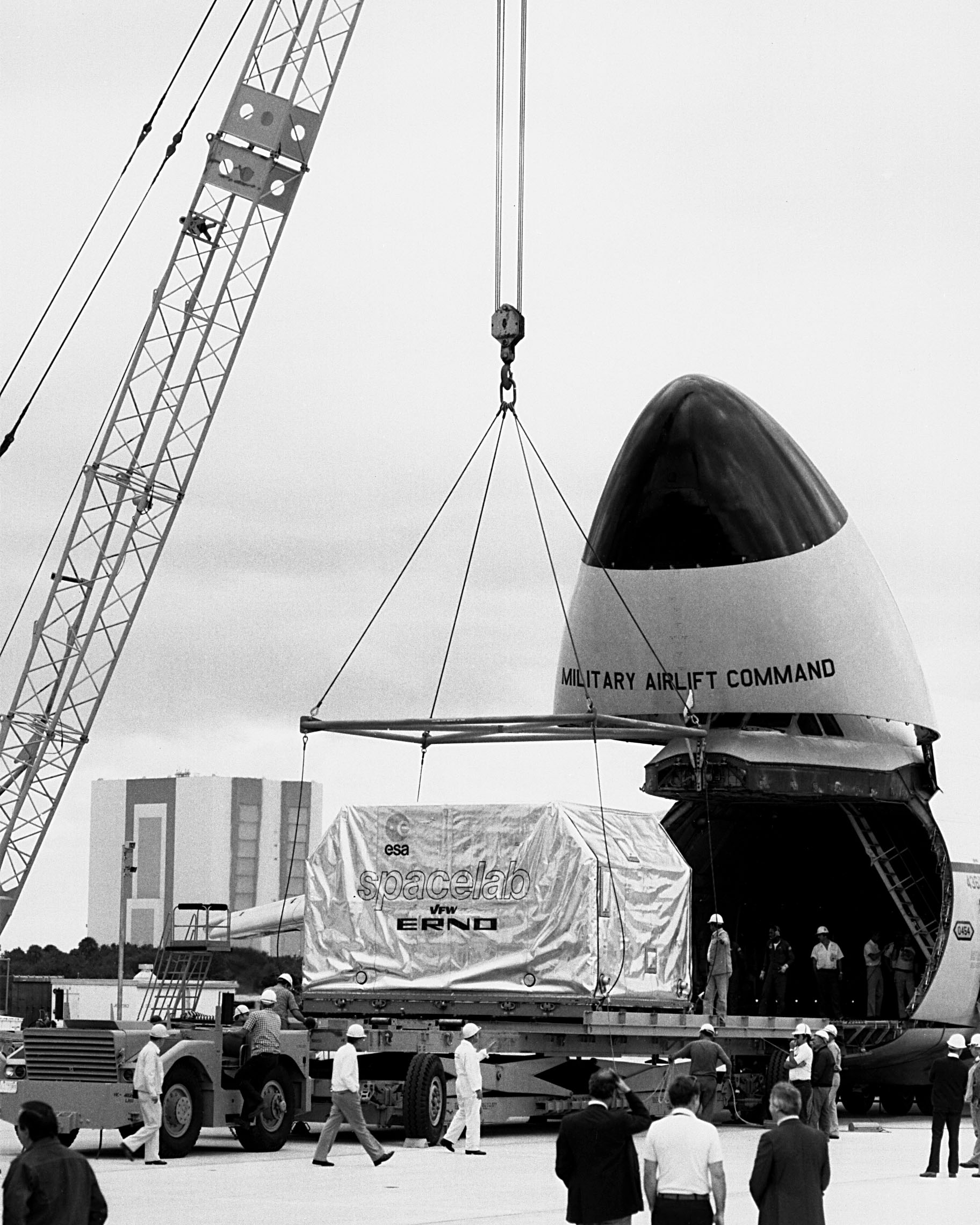
Spacelab components are delivered, 1981.

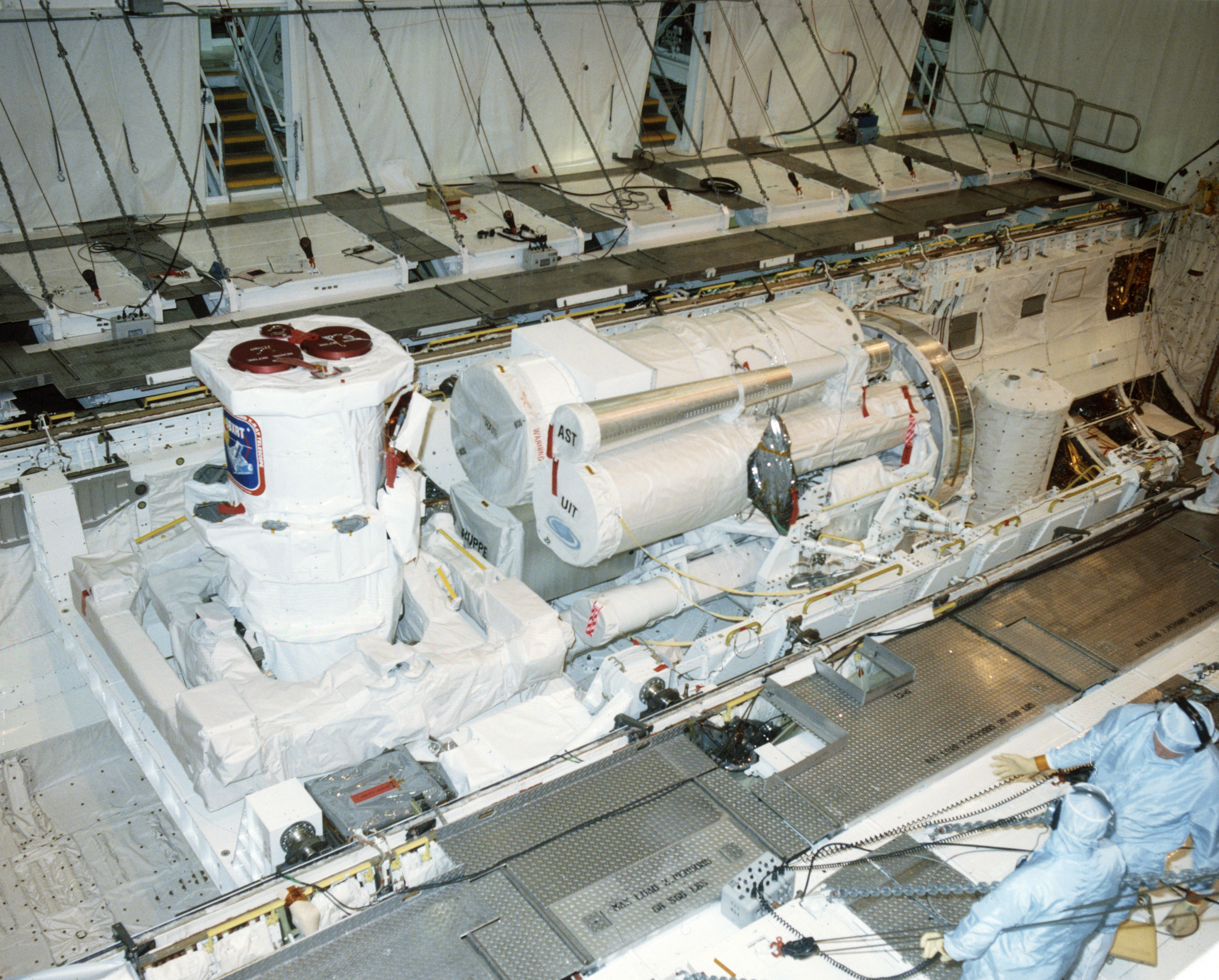
ASTRO-1 payload prepared, 1990

Examples of Spacelab components or hardware:

- EVA Airlock
- Tunnel
- Tunnel adapter
- Igloo
- Spacelab module
  - Forward end cone
  - Aft end cone
  - Core segment/module
  - Experiment racks
  - Experiment segment/module
- Electrical Ground Support Equipment
- Mechanical Ground Support Equipment
- Electrical Power Distribution Subsystem
- Command and Data Management Subsystem
- Environmental Control Subsystem
- Instrument Pointing System
- Pallet Structure
- Multi-Purpose Experiment Support Structure (MPESS)

The Extended Duration Orbiter (EDO) assembly was not Spacelab hardware, strictly speaking. However, it was used most often on Spacelab flights. Also, NASA later used it with the SpaceHab modules.

== Missions ==
Spacelab 1 mission patch

STS-90 Neurolab mission patch

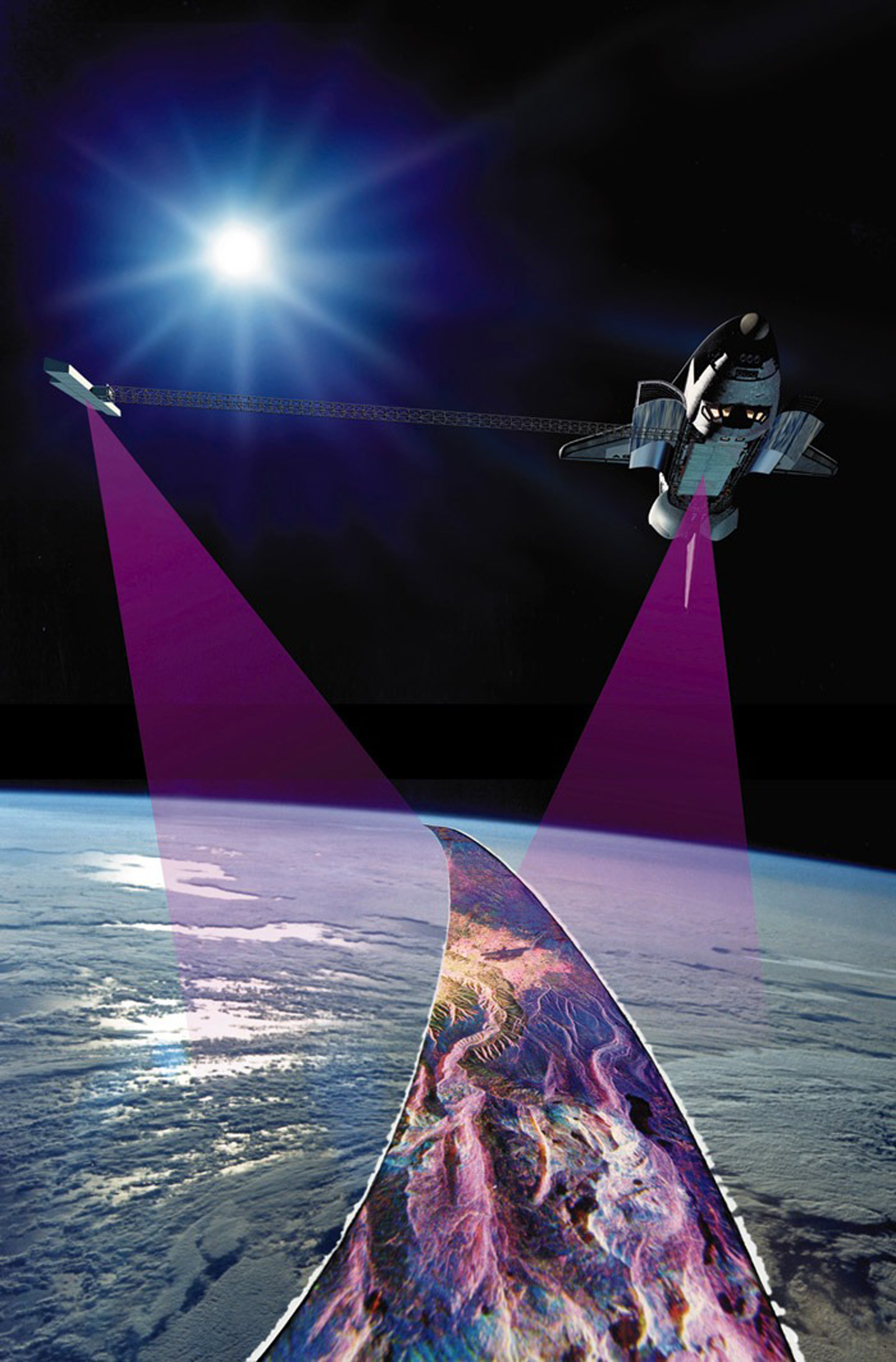
STS-99 radar Earth observation mission illustration

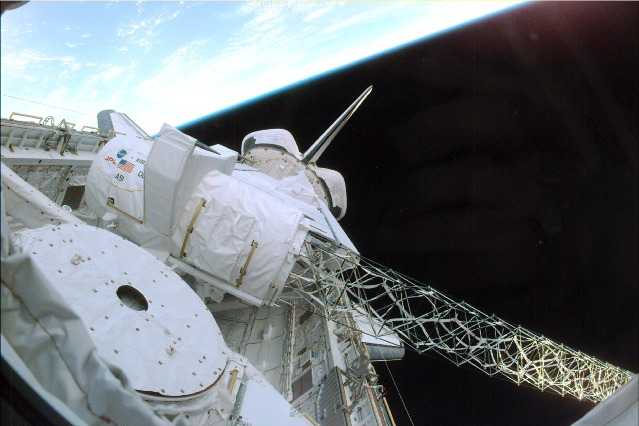
View of orbiter bay on STS-99 with radar boom deployed, 2000

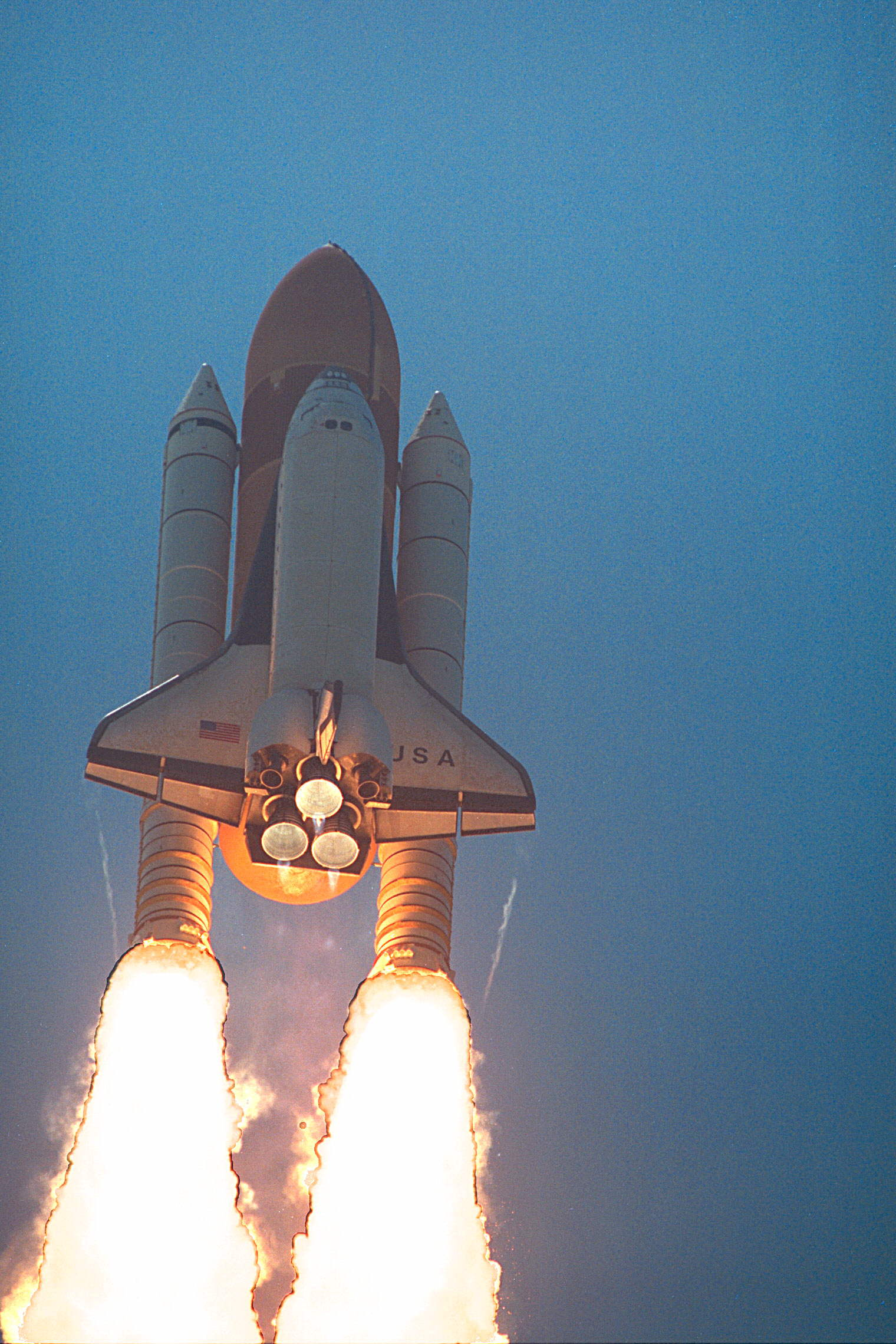
STS-94 heads into orbit for the Microgravity research mission using Spacelab, 1997.

Spacelab components flew on 22 Space Shuttle missions from November 1983 to April 1998. The Spacelab components were decommissioned in 1998, except the Pallets. Science work was moved to the International Space Station (ISS) and Spacehab module, a pressurized carrier similar to the Spacelab Module. A Spacelab Pallet was recommissioned in 2000 for flight on STS-99. The "Spacelab Pallet – Deployable 1 (SLP-D1) with Canadian Dextre (Purpose Dexterous Manipulator)" was launched on STS-123. The Spacelab components were used on 41 Shuttle missions in total.

The habitable modules were flown on 16 Space Shuttle missions in the 1980s and 1990s. Spacelab Pallet missions were flown 6 times and Spacelab Pallets were flown on other missions 19 times.

Mission name	Orbiter	Launch date	Spacelab mission name	Pressurized module	Unpressurized modules
STS-2	Columbia	12 November 1981	OSTA-1		1 Pallet (E002)
STS-3	Columbia	22 March 1982	OSS-1		1 Pallet (E003)
STS-9	Columbia	28 November 1983	Spacelab 1	Module LM1	1 Pallet (F001)
STS-41-G	Challenger	5 October 1984	OSTA-3		1 Pallet (F006)
STS-51-A	Discovery	8 November 1984	Retrieval of 2 satellites		2 Pallets (F007+F008)
STS-51-B	Challenger	29 April 1985	Spacelab 3	Module LM1	MPESS
STS-51-F	Challenger	29 July 1985	Spacelab 2	Igloo	3 Pallets (F003+F004+F005) + IPS
STS-61-A	Challenger	30 October 1985	Spacelab D1	Module LM2	MPESS
STS-35	Columbia	2 December 1990	ASTRO-1	Igloo	2 Pallets (F002+F010) + IPS
STS-40	Columbia	5 June 1991	SLS-1	Module LM1	
STS-42	Discovery	22 January 1992	IML-1	Module LM2	
STS-45	Atlantis	24 March 1992	ATLAS-1	Igloo	2 Pallets (F004+F005)
STS-50	Columbia	25 June 1992	USML-1	Module LM1	EDO
STS-46	Atlantis	31 July 1992	TSS-1		1 Pallet (F003)
STS-47 (J)	Endeavour	12 September 1992	Spacelab-J	Module LM2	
STS-56	Discovery	8 April 1993	ATLAS-2	Igloo	1 Pallet (F008)
STS-55 (D2)	Columbia	26 April 1993	Spacelab D2	Module LM1	Unique Support Structure (USS)
STS-58	Columbia	18 October 1993	SLS-2	Module LM2	EDO
STS-61	Endeavour	2 December 1993	HST SM 01		1 Pallet (F009)
STS-59	Endeavour	9 April 1994	SRL-1		1 Pallet (F006)
STS-65	Columbia	8 July 1994	IML-2	Module LM1	EDO
STS-64	Discovery	9 September 1994	LITE		1 Pallet (F007)
STS-68	Endeavour	30 September 1994	SRL-2		1 Pallet (F006)
STS-66	Atlantis	3 November 1994	ATLAS-3	Igloo	1 Pallet (F008)
STS-67	Endeavour	2 March 1995	ASTRO-2	Igloo	2 Pallets (F002+F010) + IPS + EDO
STS-71	Atlantis	27 June 1995	Spacelab-Mir	Module LM2	
STS-73	Columbia	20 October 1995	USML-2	Module LM1	EDO
STS-75	Columbia	22 February 1996	TSS-1R / USMP-3		1 Pallet (F003) + 2 MPESS + EDO
STS-78	Columbia	20 June 1996	LMS	Module LM2	EDO
STS-82	Discovery	21 February 1997	HST SM 02		1 Pallet (F009)
STS-83	Columbia	4 April 1997	MSL-1	Module LM1	EDO
STS-94	Columbia	1 July 1997	MSL-1R	Module LM1	EDO
STS-90	Columbia	17 April 1998	Neurolab	Module LM2	EDO
STS-103	Discovery	20 December 1999	HST SM 03A		1 Pallet (F009)
STS-99	Endeavour	11 February 2000	SRTM		1 Pallet (F006)
STS-92	Discovery	11 October 2000	ISS assembly		1 Pallet (F005)
STS-100	Endeavour	19 April 2001	ISS assembly		1 Pallet (F004)
STS-104	Atlantis	12 July 2001	ISS assembly		2 Pallets (F002+F010)
STS-109	Columbia	1 March 2002	HST SM 03B		1 Pallet (F009)
STS-123	Endeavour	11 March 2008	ISS assembly		1 Pallet (F004)
STS-125	Atlantis	11 May 2009	HST SM 04		1 Pallet (F009)

Mission name acronyms:

- ATLAS: Atmospheric Laboratory for Applications and Science
- ASTRO: Not an acronym; abbreviation for "astronomy"
- IML: International Microgravity Laboratory
- LITE: Lidar In-space Technology Experiment
- LMS: Life and Microgravity Sciences
- MSL: Materials Science Laboratory
- SLS: Spacelab Life Sciences
- SRL: Space Radar Laboratory
- TSS: Tethered Satellite System
- USML: U.S. Microgravity Laboratory
- USMP: U.S. Microgravity Payload

Besides contributing to ESA missions, Germany and Japan each funded their own Space Shuttle and Spacelab missions. Although superficially similar to other flights, they were actually the first and only non-U.S. and non-European human space missions with complete German and Japanese control.

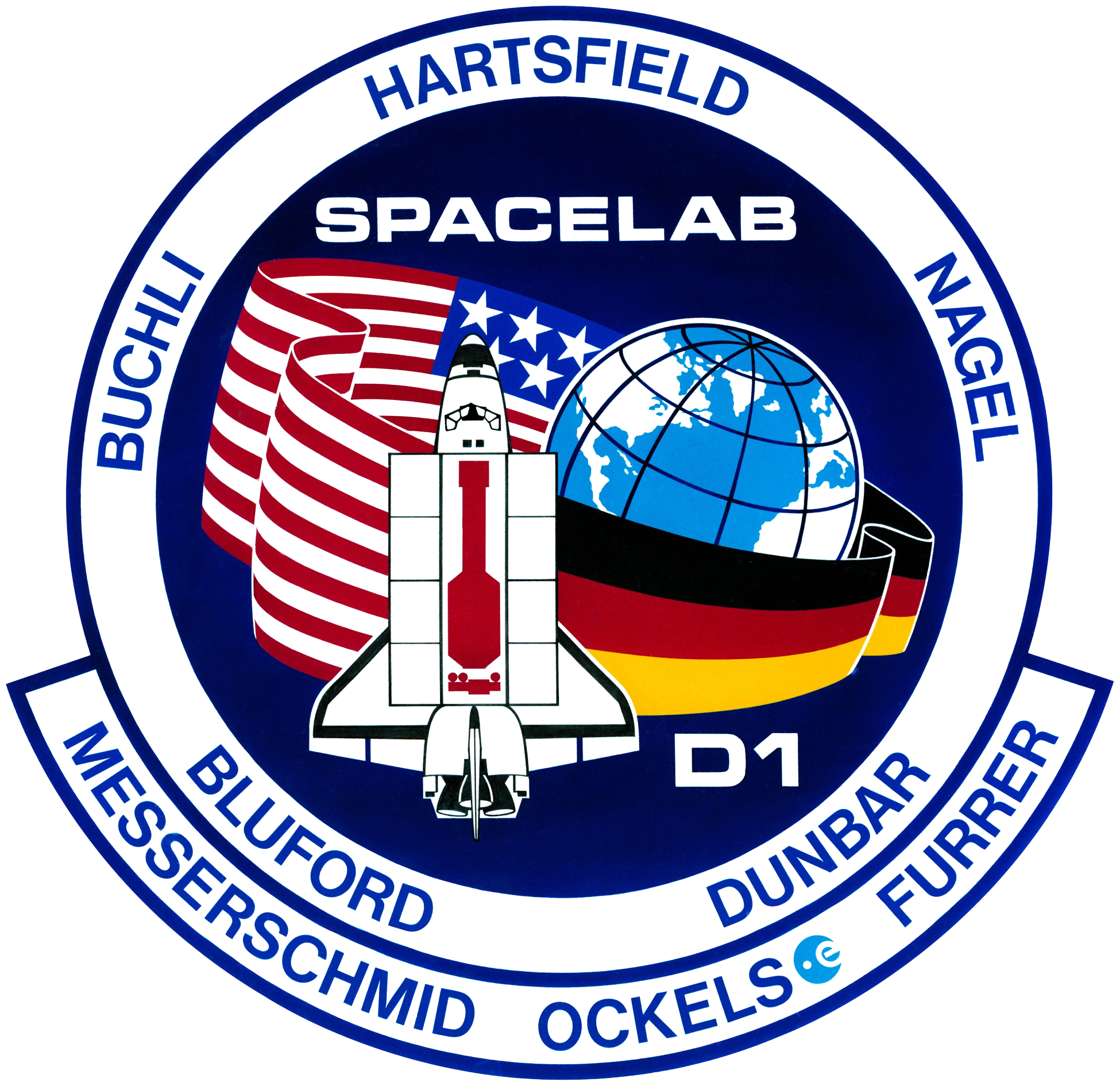
The Deutschland-1 orbital space plane flight, funded by West Germany, included over seven tons of German science research equipment.

The first West German mission Deutschland 1 (Spacelab-D1, DLR-1, NASA designation STS-61-A) took place in 1985. A second similar mission, Deutschland 2 (Spacelab-D2, DLR-2, NASA designation STS-55), was first planned for 1988, but due to the Space Shuttle Challenger disaster, was delayed until 1993. It became the first German human space mission after German reunification.

The only Japan mission, Spacelab-J (NASA designation STS-47), took place in 1992.

=== Other missions ===
- STS-92, October 2000, PMA-3, ( Discovery)
- STS-108, December 2001, Lightweight Mission Peculiar Support Structure Carrier (LMC) ( Endeavour)
- STS-123, March 2008, Pallet ( Endeavour), Dextre

=== Cancelled missions ===
Spacelab-4, Spacelab-5, and other planned Spacelab missions were cancelled due to the late development of the Shuttle and the Challenger disaster.

=== Gallery ===
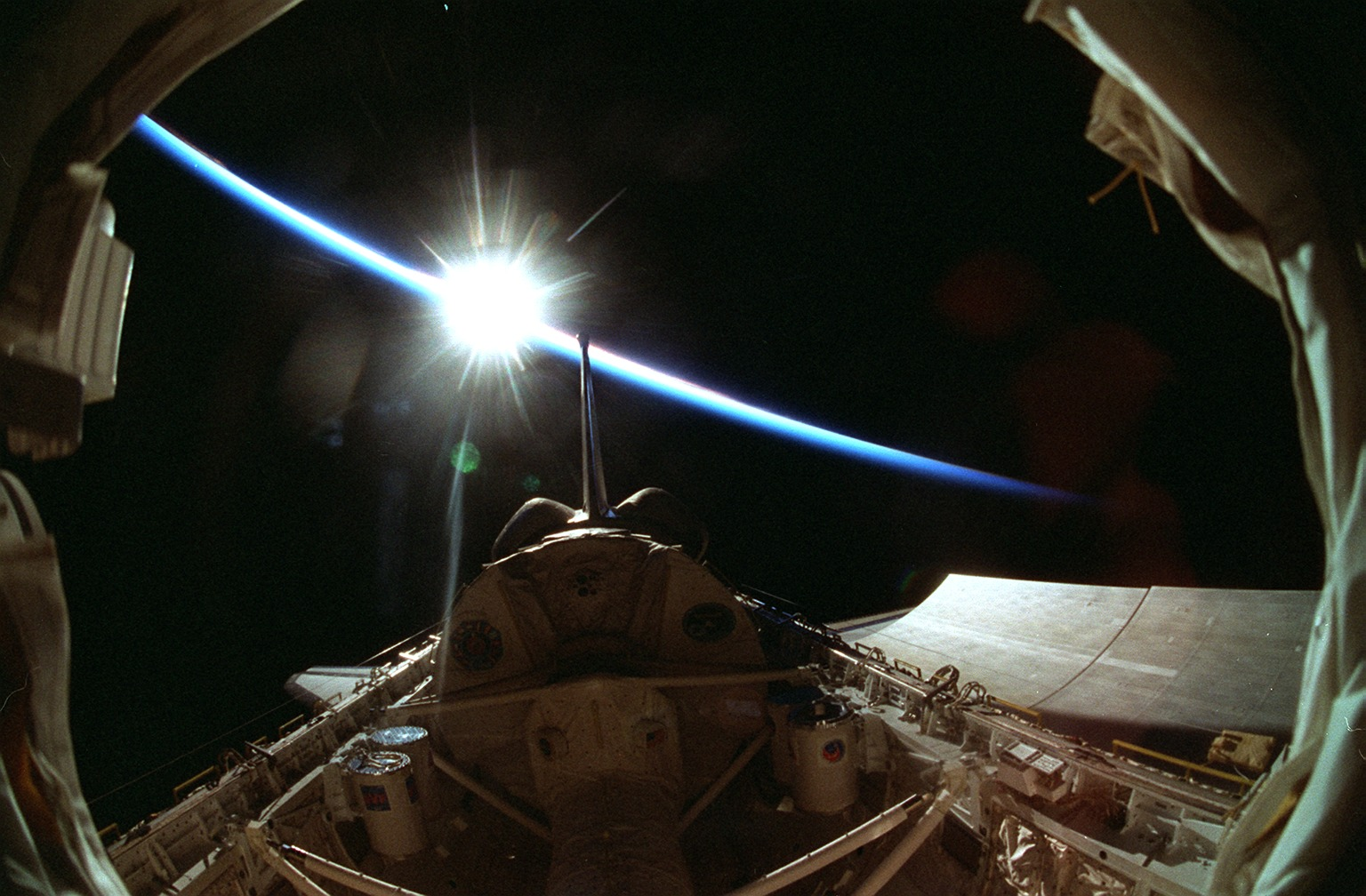
Spacelab in payload bay during STS-90

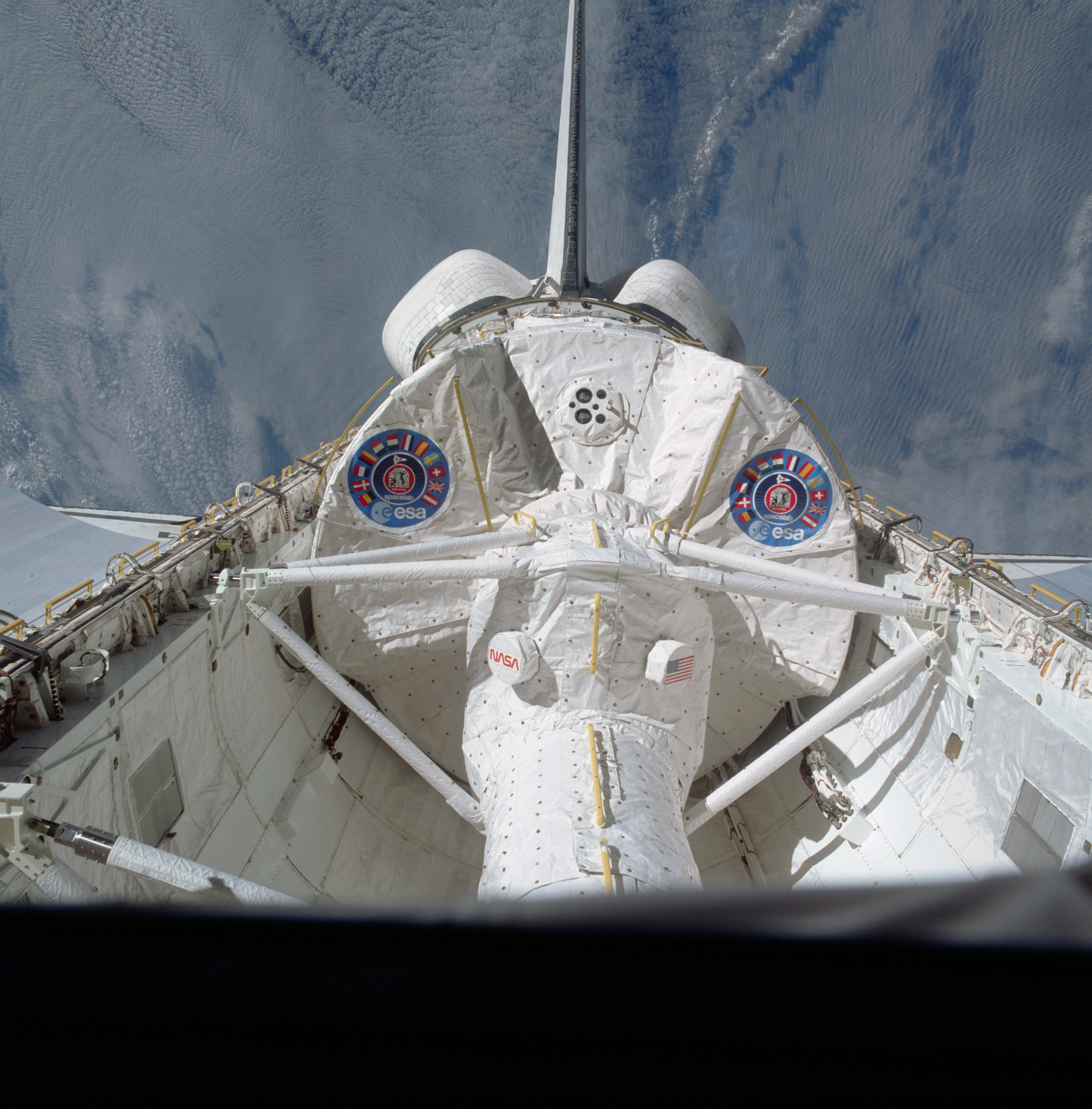
Shuttle Columbia during STS-9 with Spacelab Module LM1 and tunnel in its cargo bay

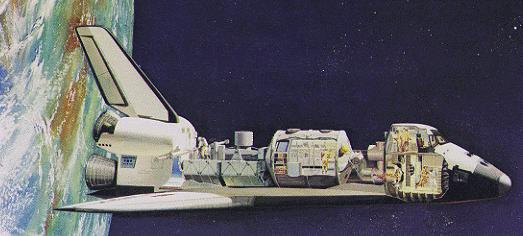
Illustrated cutaway of orbiter and lab

== Legacy ==
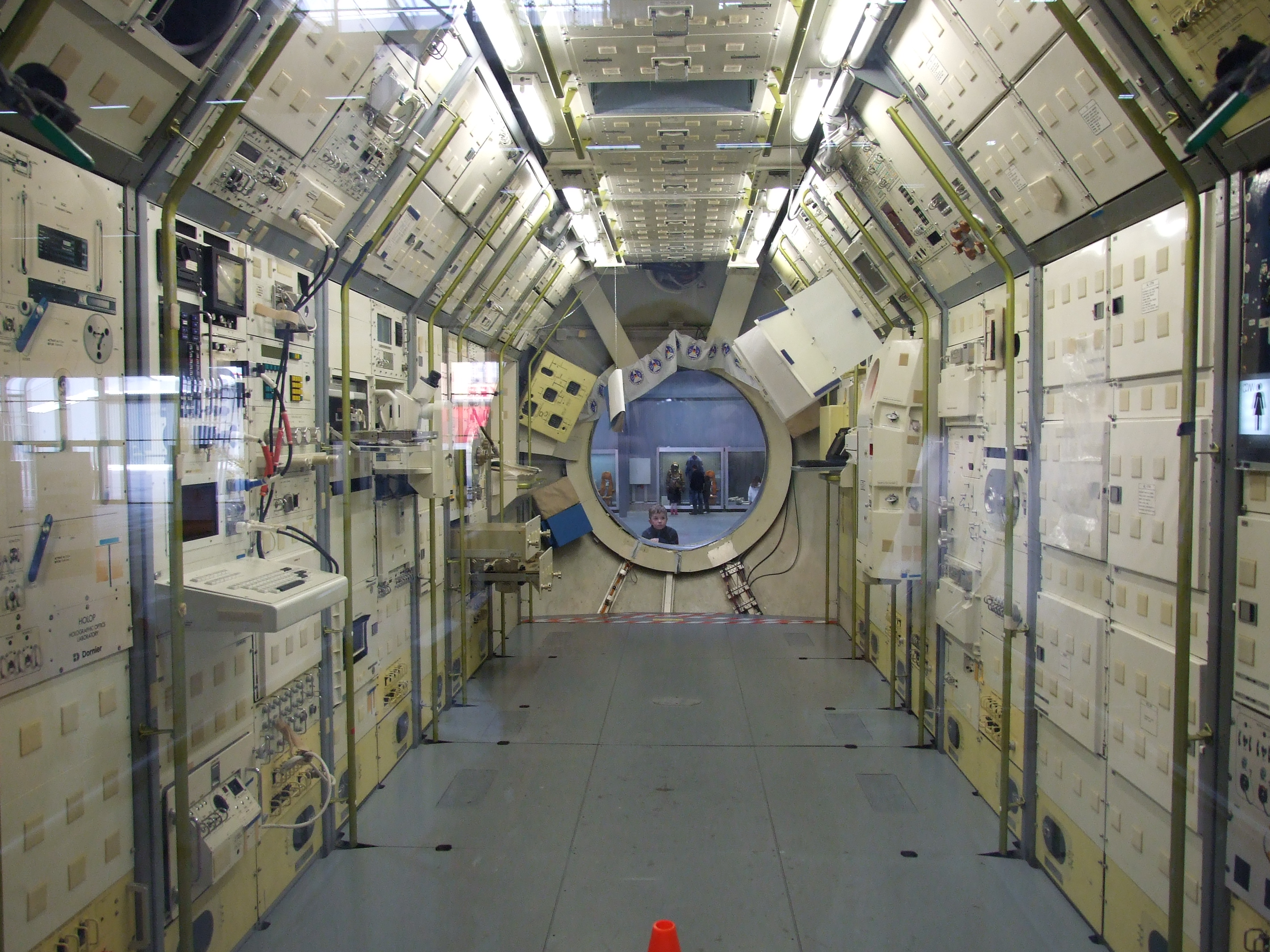
Spacelab LM2 in Speyer, Germany (2008)

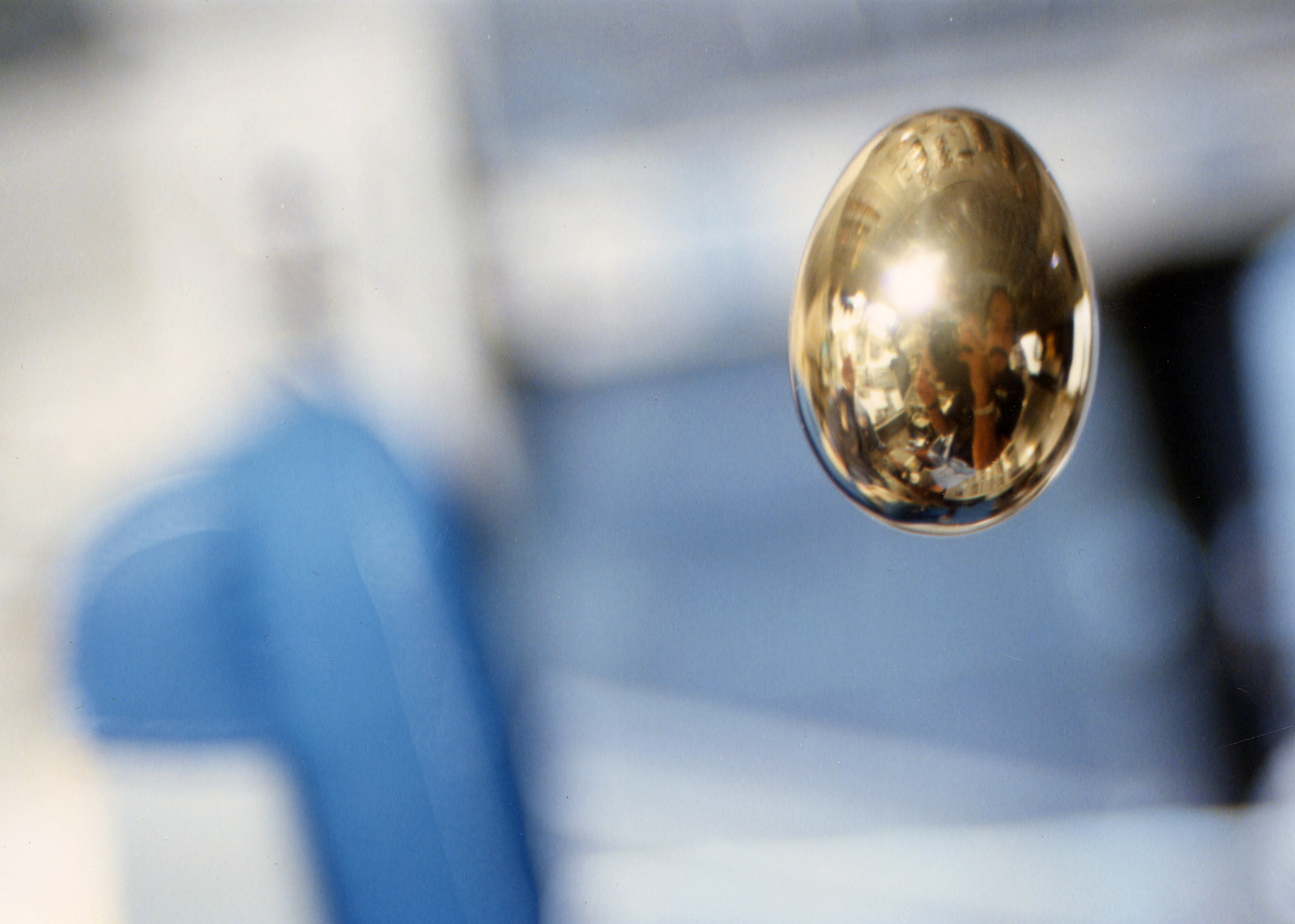
A golden-colored egg floating weightless on the Spacelab D1 mission, due to the continuous free-fall of being in orbit creating a microgravity environment on the spacecraft, 1985

The legacy of Spacelab lives on in the form of the MPLMs and the systems derived from it. These systems include the ATV and Cygnus spacecraft used to transfer payloads to the International Space Station, and the Columbus, Harmony and Tranquility modules of the International Space Station.

The Spacelab 2 mission surveyed 60% of the galactic plane in infrared in 1985.

Spacelab was an extremely large program, and this was enhanced by different experiments and multiple payloads and configurations over two decades. For example, in a subset of just one part of the Spacelab 1 (STS-9) mission, no less than eight different imaging systems were flown into space. Including those experiments, there was a total of 73 separate experiments across different disciplines on the Spacelab 1 flight alone. Spacelab missions conducted experiments in materials, life, solar, astrophysics, atmospheric, and Earth science.

Spacelab represents a major investment on the order of one billion dollars from our European friends. But its completion marks something equally important: The commitment of a dogged, dedicated, and talented team drawn from ESA Governments, universities, and industries who stuck with it for a decade and saw the project through. We are proud of your perseverance and congratulate you on your success.

— NASA Administrator, 1982

== Diagram, Spacelab module and pallet ==
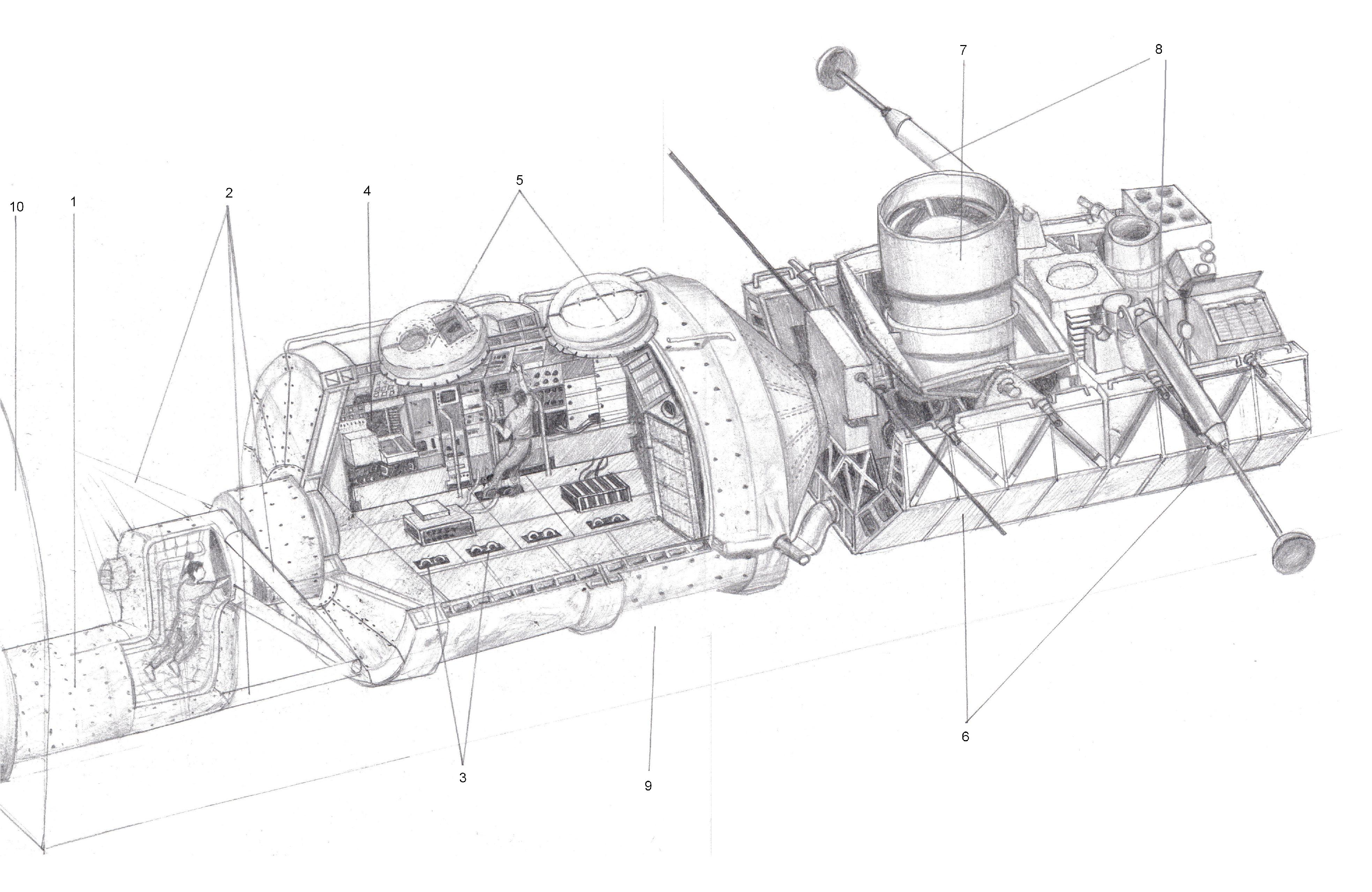
Spacelab layout showing tunnel, pressurized Module and Pallet: 1. transitional and connecting tunnel between orbiter and Spacelab; 2. payload space hinges; 3. footstalks; 4. experimental unit; 5. hyperbaric (?) modules; 6. external platform; 7. infrared telescope; 8. device for research Earth's magnetic field; 9. payload space of orbiter; 10. back side of front part of orbiter

== See also ==
- Columbus Man-Tended Free Flyer
- Hermes (spacecraft)
- International Space Station
  - Columbus (ISS module)
- Space Shuttle retirement
- Space Station Freedom
- Spacehab module (various, not to be confused with Spacelab)
- Spacelab, a 1978 song by Kraftwerk
