= List of space travelers by nationality =

Map of countries (and successor states) that have sent humans into space as of June 2025. In dark blue are countries with their own human spacecraft.

The criteria for determining who has achieved human spaceflight vary. The Fédération Aéronautique Internationale (FAI) defines spaceflight as any flight over 100 kilometres (62 mi), while in the United States, professional, military and commercial astronauts who travel above an altitude of 50 miles (80 km) are awarded astronaut wings. The majority of people who have flown into space have done so by entering Earth orbit. This list includes people meeting all three criteria, in separate subdivisions.

The flags indicate the space traveler's nationality at the time of their flight. In cases of dual citizenship, the space traveler is listed under their primary residence. A secondary list appended to the entry for the Soviet Union shows the birth countries of space travelers not born in Russia. A similar list after the entry for the United States shows the birth countries of space travelers who were citizens of the US but were born elsewhere. Flags shown in the secondary lists are those in use at the time of the space travelers' birth.

Names in italic are space travelers who are not part of any national astronaut program or astronaut corps (Toyohiro Akiyama, Helen Sharman, the Space Adventures customers and the sub-orbital SpaceShipOne and Blue Origin pilots).

== Statistics ==
As of April 2026, people from 47 countries have traveled in space. 637 people have reached Earth orbit. 28 people have traveled beyond low Earth orbit and either circled, orbited, or walked on the Moon.

Of the 44 countries whose citizens have traveled into Earth's orbit, 25 have flown a single space traveler, and four others (Belgium, Bulgaria, the Netherlands, and the United Kingdom) have flown two each. 94% of all people to reach low Earth orbit travelers have hailed from the following eight nations:

Men (blue) and women (red) in space by nationality (as of April 2025)
United States	319♂ 60♀️ ---
Soviet Union	70♂ 2♀️ ---
Russia	52♂ 4♀️ ---
China^{3}	26♂ 4♀️ ---
Japan	12♂ 2♀️ ---
Germany^{1,2}	12♂ 1♀️ ---
France^{1}	9♂ 2♀️ ---
Canada	9♂ 2♀️ ---
Italy^{1}	8♂ 1♀️ ---
Other countries	45♂ 4♀️ ---
All countries	560♂ 82♀️ ---

^{1} Includes both national space programme activity and European Space Agency participation.
^{2} Includes astronauts from the Federal Republic of Germany and the German Democratic Republic.
^{3} Statistics for China are current as of 24 May 2026.

The number of people who have reached into space falls sharply with increasing distance from Earth. The table shows cumulative counts by maximum distance reached.

Achievement	Elevation above Earth's surface (km)	People
Moon surface	384,000	12
Circumlunar	384,000	28
Earth orbit	200	637
Kármán line	100	781

Circumlunar includes crewed flights around the Moon, whether by lunar orbit or lunar flyby. Earth orbit is represented by 200 km as a rounded low-Earth-orbit altitude; orbital flight also requires sufficient velocity to sustain an orbit.

== Orbital space travelers ==
Orbital space travelers (as of August 17th, 2024)

=== Afghanistan ===
- Abdul Ahad Mohmand (Intercosmos), first Afghan in space — Soyuz TM-6/5 (1988)

=== Australia ===
- Andy Thomas – STS-77 (1996)
- Paul Desmond Scully-Power, first Australian in space – STS-41-G (1984)
- Eric Philips – Fram2 (2025)

=== Belarus ===
- Marina Vasilevskaya, first Belarusian in space. — Soyuz MS-25/MS-24 (2024)

=== Brazil ===
- Marcos Pontes, first Brazilian in space, first lusophone in space, first professional astronaut officially representing a Southern Hemisphere country in space. — Soyuz TMA-8/Missão Centenário (2006)

=== Bulgaria ===
- Georgi Ivanov (Intercosmos), first Bulgarian in space. — Soyuz 33 (1979)
- Aleksandar Panayotov Aleksandrov (Intercosmos) — Soyuz TM-5/4 (1988)

=== Canada ===
- Marc Garneau, first Canadian in space — STS-41-G (1984), STS-77 (1996), STS-97 (2000)
- Roberta Bondar, first Canadian woman in space — STS-42 (1992)
- Steven MacLean — STS-52 (1992), STS-115 (2006)
- Chris Hadfield, first Canadian to walk in space — STS-74 (1995), STS-100 (2001), Soyuz TMA-07M (2012)
- Robert Thirsk — STS-78 (1996), Soyuz TMA-15 (2009)
- Bjarni Tryggvason, born in Iceland — STS-85 (1997)
- Julie Payette — STS-96 (1999), STS-127 (2009)
- Dafydd Williams — STS-90 (1998), STS-118 (2007)
- Guy Laliberté, space tourist — Soyuz TMA-16/14 (2009)
- David Saint-Jacques – Soyuz MS-11 (2018)
- Mark Pathy, Axiom Mission 1 (2022)
- Jeremy Hansen - Artemis II (2026)

NASA astronaut Andrew J. Feustel is a naturalized Canadian citizen.

=== China ===
- Yang Liwei, first Chinese national in space — Shenzhou 5 (2003)
- Fei Junlong — Shenzhou 6 (2005), Shenzhou 15 (2022)
- Nie Haisheng — Shenzhou 6 (2005), Shenzhou 10 (2013), Shenzhou 12 (2021)
- Zhai Zhigang, first Chinese national to walk in space — Shenzhou 7 (2008), Shenzhou 13 (2021)
- Liu Boming — Shenzhou 7 (2008), Shenzhou 12 (2021)
- Jing Haipeng — Shenzhou 7 (2008), Shenzhou 9 (2012), Shenzhou 11 (2016), Shenzhou 16 (2023)
- Liu Wang — Shenzhou 9 (2012)
- Liu Yang, first Chinese woman in space — Shenzhou 9 (2012), Shenzhou 14 (2022)
- Wang Yaping — Shenzhou 10 (2013), Shenzhou 13 (2021)
- Zhang Xiaoguan — Shenzhou 10 (2013)
- Chen Dong — Shenzhou 11 (2016), Shenzhou 14 (2022), Shenzhou 20 (2025)
- Tang Hongbo — Shenzhou 12 (2021), Shenzhou 17 (2023)
- Ye Guangfu — Shenzhou 13 (2021), Shenzhou 18 (2024)
- Cai Xuzhe — Shenzhou 14 (2022), Shenzhou 19 (2024)
- Deng Qingming — Shenzhou 15 (2022)
- Zhang Lu — Shenzhou 15 (2022), Shenzhou 21 (2025)
- Zhu Yangzhu — Shenzhou 16 (2023), Shenzhou 23 (2026)
- Gui Haichao — Shenzhou 16 (2023)
- Tang Shengjie — Shenzhou 17 (2023)
- Jiang Xinlin — Shenzhou 17 (2023)
- Li Cong — Shenzhou 18 (2024)
- Li Guangsu — Shenzhou 18 (2024)
- Song Lingdong — Shenzhou 19 (2024)
- Wang Haoze — Shenzhou 19 (2024)
- Chen Zhongrui — Shenzhou 20 (2025)
- Wang Jie — Shenzhou 20 (2025)
- Wu Fei — Shenzhou 21 (2025)
- Zhang Hongzhang — Shenzhou 21 (2025)
- Zhang Zhiyuan — Shenzhou 23 (2026)
- Lai Ka-ying — Shenzhou 23 (2026)

=== Cuba ===
- Arnaldo Tamayo Méndez (Intercosmos), the first Cuban and the first person from a country in the Western Hemisphere other than the US to travel to space. He was also the first Hispanophone and first person of African ancestry in space. — Soyuz 38 (1980)

=== Czechoslovakia ===
- Vladimír Remek (Intercosmos), first Czechoslovak and first non-Soviet European in space. — Soyuz 28 (1978)

=== European Space Agency members ===
Some of these astronauts participated in national space programme activity unrelated to their home country's contemporary or subsequent membership of the European Space Agency.

==== Austria ====
- Franz Viehböck, first Austrian in space. — Soyuz TM-13/12 (1991)

==== Belgium ====
- Dirk Frimout, first Belgian in space. — STS-45 (1992)
- Frank De Winne, EAC — Soyuz TMA-1/TM-34 (2002), Soyuz TMA-15 (2009)

==== Denmark ====
- Andreas Mogensen, EAC, first Dane in space. — Soyuz TMA-18M (2015)/16M (2015), SpaceX Crew-7 (2023)

==== France ====
- Jean-Loup Chrétien, CNES (Intercosmos), first French person in space and first non-Soviet European to walk in space — Soyuz T-6 (1982), Soyuz TM-7/6 (1988), STS-86 (1997)
- Patrick Baudry, second Frenchman in space, born in Douala, Cameroon — STS-51-G (1985)
- Michel Tognini, EAC — Soyuz TM-15/14 (1992), STS-93 (1999)
- Jean-Pierre Haigneré, EAC — Soyuz TM-17/16 (1993), Soyuz TM-29 (1999)
- Jean-François Clervoy, EAC — STS-66 (1994), STS-84 (1997), STS-103 (1999)
- Jean-Jacques Favier, born in Kehl, Germany — STS-78 (1996)
- Claudie André-Deshays Haigneré, EAC, first Frenchwoman in space (Mir, 1996) — Soyuz TM-24/23 (1996), Soyuz TM-33/32 (2001)
- Léopold Eyharts, EAC — Soyuz TM-27/26 (1998), STS-122/123 (2008)
- Philippe Perrin, EAC, born in Meknes, Morocco — STS-111 (2002)
- Thomas Pesquet, EAC — Soyuz MS-03 (2016), SpaceX Crew-2 (2021)
- Sophie Adenot, EAC — SpaceX Crew-12 (2026)

==== Germany ====
- Sigmund Jähn (Intercosmos), first German in space — Soyuz 31/29 (1978) (flew for East Germany)
- Ulf Merbold, EAC — STS-9 (1983), STS-42 (1992), Soyuz TM-20/19 (1994) (flew for both West Germany and united Germany)
- Ernst Messerschmid — STS-61-A (1985) (flew for West Germany)
- Reinhard Furrer, born in Wörgl, Austria (1940–1995) — STS-61-A (1985) (flew for West Germany)
- Klaus-Dietrich Flade — Soyuz TM-14/13 (1992)
- Ulrich Walter — STS-55 (1993)
- Hans Schlegel, EAC — STS-55 (1993), STS-122 (2008)
- Reinhold Ewald, EAC — Soyuz TM-25/24 (1997)
- Gerhard Thiele, EAC — STS-99 (2000)
- Thomas Reiter, EAC, first German to walk in space and first ESA astronaut to stay on the ISS. — Soyuz TM-22 (1995), STS-121/116 (2006)
- Alexander Gerst, EAC — Soyuz TMA-13M (2014), Soyuz MS-09 (2018)
- Matthias Maurer, EAC — SpaceX Crew-3 (2021)
- Rabea Rogge — Fram2 (2025), first German woman in space

==== Hungary ====
- Bertalan Farkas (Intercosmos), first Hungarian in space. — Soyuz 36/35 (1980)
- Tibor Kapu, HUNOR — Axiom Mission 4 (2025)

==== Italy ====
- Franco Malerba, first Italian in space. — STS-46 (1992)
- Maurizio Cheli, EAC — STS-75 (1996)
- Umberto Guidoni, EAC — STS-75 (1996), STS-100 (2001)
- Roberto Vittori, EAC — Soyuz TM-34/33 (2002), Soyuz TMA-6/5 (2005), STS-134 (2011)
- Paolo A. Nespoli, EAC — STS-120 (2007), Soyuz TMA-20 (2010), Soyuz MS-05 (2017)
- Luca Parmitano, EAC, first Italian to walk in space. — Soyuz TMA-09M (2013), Soyuz MS-13 (2019)
- Samantha Cristoforetti, EAC, first Italian woman in space — Soyuz TMA-15M (2014), SpaceX Crew-4 (2022)
- Walter Villadei — Axiom Mission 3 (2024)

==== Netherlands ====
- Wubbo Ockels, EAC, first Dutchman in space. — STS-61-A (1985)
- André Kuipers, EAC — Soyuz TMA-4/3 (2004), Soyuz TMA-03M (2011)

==== Norway ====
- Jannicke Mikkelsen, also holds British citizenship. — Fram2 (2025)

(Marcus Wandt, who went on Axiom Mission 3 in 2024, is listed under Sweden but also holds a Norwegian passport.)

==== Malta ====
- Chun Wang, born in Tianjin, China, also holds Saint Kitts and Nevis passport. — Fram2 (2025)

==== Poland ====
- Mirosław Hermaszewski (Intercosmos), first Pole in space. — Soyuz 30 (1978)
- Sławosz Uznański-Wiśniewski, EAC — Axiom Mission 4 (2025)

==== Romania ====
- Dumitru Prunariu (Intercosmos), first Romanian in space. — Soyuz 40 (1981)

==== Spain ====
- Pedro Duque, EAC, first Spaniard in space. — STS-95 (1998), Soyuz TMA-3/2 (2003)

Additionally, Michael López-Alegría, born in Madrid to an American mother and Spanish father who moved to California at the age of 9, holds both Spanish and American nationality. A six-time astronaut with the most recent mission in 2024, he is in the top five astronauts who have been to space most often, and has the second longest record for spacewalks, spending a total of 68 hours walking in Outer Space, which is also the longest among non-Russian astronauts and the longest in the 21st century. After retiring from NASA, López-Alegría commanded Axiom-1, the first ever all-private team of commercial astronaut mission in 2021.

==== Sweden ====
- Christer Fuglesang, EAC, first Swede in space. — STS-116 (2006), STS-128 (2009)
- Marcus Wandt, EAC — Axiom Mission 3 (2024)

(Jessica Meir, who went on Soyuz MS-15 in 2019, is listed under United States but also holds a Swedish passport.)

==== Switzerland ====
- Claude Nicollier, EAC, first Swiss in space. — STS-46 (1992), STS-61 (1993), STS-75 (1996), STS-103 (1999)

==== United Kingdom ====
- Helen Sharman, Project Juno, first Briton in space. — Soyuz TM-12/11 (1991)
- Tim Peake, EAC, first professional British astronaut in space. — Soyuz TMA-19M (2015)

Additionally, Michael Foale was born in England to a British father and American mother. He is a dual citizen of the United Kingdom and the United States, and was raised and educated in England. He flew as a member of NASA's Astronaut Corps with dual British American citizenship. Piers Sellers, Nicholas Patrick, Richard Garriott, Marcus Wandt and Mark Shuttleworth have dual nationalities.

=== India ===
- Rakesh Sharma (Intercosmos), first Indian national in space. — Soyuz T-11/10 (1984)
- Shubhanshu Shukla (Gaganyaan) — Axiom Mission 4 (2025)

=== Israel ===
- Ilan Ramon (1954–2003), first Israeli in space, died on the Columbia. — STS-107 (2003)
- Eytan Stibbe — Axiom Mission 1 (2022)

=== Japan ===
- Toyohiro Akiyama, first Japanese person in space, the first journalist in space, and the first civilian on a commercial space flight. — Soyuz TM-11/10 (1990)
- Chiaki Mukai, first Japanese woman in space. — STS-65 (1994), STS-95 (1998)
- Koichi Wakata — STS-72 (1996), STS-92 (2000), STS-119/127 (2009), Soyuz TMA-11M (2013), SpaceX Crew-5 (2022)
- Takao Doi, first Japanese man to walk in space. — STS-87 (1997), STS-123 (2008)
- Mamoru Mohri — STS-47 (1992), STS-99 (2000)
- Soichi Noguchi — STS-114 (2005), Soyuz TMA-17 (2009), SpaceX Crew-1 (2020)
- Akihiko Hoshide — STS-124 (2008), Soyuz TMA-05M (2012), SpaceX Crew-2 (2021)
- Naoko Yamazaki — STS-131 (2010)
- Satoshi Furukawa — Soyuz TMA-01M (2011), SpaceX Crew-7 (2023)
- Kimiya Yui — Soyuz TMA-17M (2015), SpaceX Crew-11 (2025)
- Takuya Onishi — Soyuz MS-01 (2016), SpaceX Crew-10 (2025)
- Norishige Kanai — Soyuz MS-07 (2017)
- Yusaku Maezawa — Soyuz MS-20 (2021)
- Yozo Hirano — Soyuz MS-20 (2021)

=== Kazakhstan ===
- Aidyn Aimbetov — Soyuz TMA-18M/16M (2015)
- Note: Kazakh cosmonauts Toktar Aubakirov and Talgat Musabayev flew under the Soviet and Russian flags respectively.

=== Malaysia ===
- Sheikh Muszaphar Shukor, first Malaysian in space — Soyuz TMA-11/10 (2007)

=== Mexico ===
- Rodolfo Neri Vela, first Mexican in space. — STS-61-B (1985)

=== Mongolia ===
- Jügderdemidiin Gürragchaa (Intercosmos), first Mongolian in space. — Soyuz 39 (1981)

=== Russian Federation ===
All here listed cosmonauts were citizens of the Russian Federation at the time of at least one of their space flights. The Russian Federal Space Agency (RKA) cosmonauts born outside of Russia are marked with an asterisk (*). For cosmonauts who flew for the Soviet Union see the dedicated header. The Soviet space program had no unified space agency, the parts of the program which were claimed by today's Russian Federation became part of its Russian Federal Space Agency.

==== A ====
- Viktor Mikhaylovich Afanasyev — (Soviet Union) Soyuz TM-11 (1990), (Russia) Soyuz TM-18 (1994), Soyuz TM-29 (1999), Soyuz TM-33/32 (2001)
- Oleg Artemyev* — (Russia) Soyuz TMA-12M, Soyuz MS-08, Soyuz MS-21
- Sergei Avdeyev — (Russia) Soyuz TM-15 (1992), Soyuz TM-22 (1995)

==== B ====
- Yuri Baturin, first Russian politician in space. — (Russia) Soyuz TM-28/27 (1998), Soyuz TM-32/31 (2001)
- Andrei Borisenko — (Russia) Soyuz TMA-21 (2011), Soyuz MS-02 (2016)
- Konstantin Borisov — (Russia) SpaceX Crew-7 (2023)
- Nikolai Budarin — (Russia) STS-71/Soyuz TM-21 (1995), Soyuz TM-27 (1998), STS-113/Soyuz TMA-1 (2002)

==== C ====
- Nikolai Chub — (Russia) Soyuz MS-24/MS-25 (2023)

==== D ====
- Vladimir N. Dezhurov — (Russia) Soyuz TM-21/STS-71 (1995)
- Pyotr Dubrov — (Russia) Soyuz MS-18/Soyuz MS-19 (2021–22)

==== F ====
- Andrey Fedyaev — (Russia) SpaceX Crew-6 (2023)

==== G ====
- Yuri Gidzenko* — (Russia) Soyuz TM-22 (1995), Soyuz TM-31/STS-102 (2001), Soyuz TM-34/Soyuz TM-33 (2002)
- Aleksandr Gorbunov — (Russia) SpaceX Crew-9 (2024)
- Alexander Grebenkin — (Russia) SpaceX Crew-8 (2024)

==== I ====
- Anatoli Ivanishin — (Russia) Soyuz TMA-22 (2011), Soyuz MS-01 (2016), Soyuz MS-16 (2020)

==== K ====
- Aleksandr Kaleri* — (Russia) Soyuz TM-14 (1992), Soyuz TM-24 (1996), Soyuz TM-30 (2000), Soyuz TMA-3 (2003), Soyuz TMA-01M (2010)
- Anna Kikina — (Russia) SpaceX Crew-5 (2022)
- Yelena V. Kondakova — (Russia) Soyuz TM-20 (1994), STS-84 (1997)
- Dmitri Kondratyev — (Russia) Soyuz TMA-20 (2010)
- Oleg Kononenko* — (Russia) Soyuz TMA-12 (2008), Soyuz TMA-03M (2011), Soyuz TMA-17M (2015), Soyuz MS-11 (2018), Soyuz MS-24/Soyuz MS-25 (2023)
- Mikhail Korniyenko — (Russia) Soyuz TMA-18 (2010), Soyuz TMA-16M (2015)
- Sergey Korsakov* — (Russia) Soyuz MS-21 (2022)
- Valery Korzun — (Russia) Soyuz TM-24 (1996), STS-111/113 (2002)
- Oleg Kotov* — (Russia) Soyuz TMA-10 (2007), Soyuz TMA-17 (2009), Soyuz TMA-10M (2013)
- Konstantin Kozeyev — (Russia) Soyuz TM-33/32 (2001)
- Sergei Krikalev, six space flights and, as of 2006, holds record for longest total time in space: 803 days, 9 hours and 39 minutes. — (Soviet Union) Soyuz TM-7 (1988), (Soviet Union) (Russia) Soyuz TM-12/13 (1991), (Russia) STS-60 (1994), STS-88 (1998), Soyuz TM-31/STS-102 (2000), Soyuz TMA-6 (2005)
- Sergey Kud-Sverchkov — (Russia) Soyuz MS-16 (2020)

==== L ====
- Aleksandr Lazutkin — (Russia) Soyuz TM-25 (1997)
- Yuri Lonchakov* — (Russia) STS-100 (2001), Soyuz TMA-1/TM-34 (2002), Soyuz TMA-13 (2008)

==== M ====
- Yuri Malenchenko* — (Russia) Soyuz TM-19 (1994), STS-106 (2000), Soyuz TMA-1 (2003), Soyuz TMA-11 (2007), Soyuz TMA-05M (2012), Soyuz TMA-19M (2015)
- Gennadi Manakov — (Soviet Union) Soyuz TM-10 (1990), (Russia) Soyuz TM-16 (1993)
- Denis Matveev — (Russia) Soyuz MS-21 (2022)
- Alexander Misurkin — (Russia) Soyuz TMA-08M (2013), Soyuz MS-06 (2017), Soyuz MS-20 (2021)
- Boris Morukov (1950–2015) — (Russia) STS-106 (2000)
- Talgat Musabayev* — (Russia) Soyuz TM-19 (1994), Soyuz TM-27 (1998), Soyuz TM-32/31 (2001)

==== N ====
- Oleg Novitski* — (Russia) Soyuz TMA-06M (2012), Soyuz MS-03 (2016), Soyuz MS-18 (2021), Soyuz MS-25/MS-24 (2024)

==== O ====
- Yuri Onufrienko* — (Russia) Soyuz TM-23 (1996), STS-108/111 (2001)
- Aleksei Ovchinin — (Russia) Soyuz TMA-20M (2016), Soyuz MS-10 (2018), Soyuz MS-12 (2019), Soyuz MS-26 (2024)

==== P ====
- Gennady Padalka — (Russia) Soyuz TM-28 (1998), Soyuz TMA-4 (2004), Soyuz TMA-14 (2009), Soyuz TMA-04M (2012), Soyuz TMA-16M (2015)
- Yulia Peresild — (Russia) Soyuz MS-19 (2021)
- Kirill Peskov — (Russia) SpaceX Crew-10 (2025)
- Dmitry Petelin — (Russia) Soyuz MS-22/MS-23 (2022)
- Oleg Platonov — (Russia) SpaceX Crew-11 (2025)
- Aleksandr Poleshchuk — (Russia) Soyuz TM-16 (1993)
- Valeri Polyakov, holds record for single longest spaceflight, 437 days — (Soviet Union) Soyuz TM-6/7 (1988), (Russia) Soyuz TM-18/20 (1994)
- Sergey Prokopyev — (Russia) Soyuz MS-09 (2018), Soyuz MS-22/MS-23 (2022)

==== R ====
- Sergei Revin — (Russia) Soyuz TMA-04M (2012)
- Roman Romanenko — (Russia) Soyuz TMA-15 (2009), Soyuz TMA-07M (2012)
- Sergei Ryazanski — (Russia) Soyuz TMA-10M (2013), Soyuz MS-05 (2017)
- Valery Ryumin — (Soviet Union) Soyuz 25 (1977), Soyuz 32/34 (1979), Soyuz 35/37 (1980), (Russia) STS-91 (1998)
- Sergei Ryzhikov — (Russia) Soyuz MS-02 (2016), Soyuz MS-16 (2020), Soyuz MS-27 (2025)

==== S ====
- Aleksandr Samokutyayev — (Russia) Soyuz TMA-21 (2011), Soyuz TMA-14M (2014)
- Aleksandr Serebrov (1944–2013) — (Soviet Union) Soyuz T-7/5 (1982), Soyuz T-8 (1983), Soyuz TM-8 (1989), (Russia) Soyuz TM-17 (1993)
- Yelena Serova — (Russia) Soyuz TMA-14M (2014)
- Yuri Shargin, first Russian military cosmonaut — (Russia) Soyuz TMA-5/4 (2004)
- Salizhan Sharipov* — (Russia) STS-89 (1998), Soyuz TMA-5 (2004)
- Klim Shipenko — (Russia) Soyuz MS-19 (2021)
- Anton Shkaplerov — (Russia) Soyuz TMA-22 (2011), Soyuz TMA-15M (2014) & Soyuz MS-19 (2021)
- Oleg Skripochka — (Russia) Soyuz TMA-01M (2010), Soyuz TMA-20M (2016), Soyuz MS-15 (2019)
- Aleksandr Skvortsov — (Russia) Soyuz TMA-18 (2010), Soyuz TMA-12M (2014), Soyuz MS-13 (2019)
- Anatoly Solovyev* — (Soviet Union) Soyuz TM-5/4 (1988), Soyuz TM-9 (1990), (Russia) Soyuz TM-15 (1992), STS-71/Soyuz TM-21 (1995), Soyuz TM-26 (1997)
- Gennadi Strekalov (1940–2004) — (Soviet Union) Soyuz T-3 (1980), Soyuz T-8 (1983), Soyuz T-11/10 (1984), Soyuz TM-10 (1990), (Russia) Soyuz TM-21/STS-71 (1995)
- Maksim Surayev — (Russia) Soyuz TMA-16 (2009), Soyuz TMA-13M (2014)

==== T ====
- Yevgeni Tarelkin — (Russia) Soyuz TMA-06M (2012)
- Vladimir Titov — (Soviet Union) Soyuz T-8 (1983), Soyuz TM-4/6 (1987), (Russia) STS-63 (1995), STS-86 (1997)
- Valeri Tokarev — (Russia) STS-96 (1999), Soyuz TMA-7 (2005)
- Sergei Treshchov — (Russia) STS-111/113 (2002)
- Vasili Tsibliyev* — (Russia) Soyuz TM-17 (1993), Soyuz TM-25 (1997)
- Mikhail Tyurin — (Russia) STS-105/108 (2001), Soyuz TMA-9 (2006), Soyuz TMA-11M (2013)

==== U ====
- Yuri Usachov — (Russia) Soyuz TM-18 (1994), Soyuz TM-23 (1996), STS-101 (2000), STS-102/STS-105 (2001)

==== V ====
- Ivan Vagner (Russia) Soyuz MS-16 (2020), Soyuz MS-26 (2024)
- Aleksandr Viktorenko* — (Soviet Union) Soyuz TM-3/2 (1987), Soyuz TM-8 (1989), (Russia) Soyuz TM-14 (1992), Soyuz TM-20 (1994)
- Pavel Vinogradov — (Russia) Soyuz TM-26 (1997), Soyuz TMA-8 (2006), Soyuz TMA-08M (2013)
- Alexander Volkov* — (Soviet Union) Soyuz T-14 (1985), Soyuz TM-7 (1988), (Soviet Union) / (Russia) Soyuz TM-13 (1991)
- Sergey Aleksandrovich Volkov* — (Russia) Soyuz TMA-12 (2008), Soyuz TMA-01M (2011), Soyuz TMA-18M (2015)

==== Y ====
- Fyodor Yurchikhin* — (Russia) STS-112 (2002), Soyuz TMA-10 (2007), Soyuz TMA-19 (2010), Soyuz TMA-09M (2013), Soyuz MS-04 (2017)

==== Z ====
- Sergei Zalyotin — (Russia) Soyuz TM-30 (2000), Soyuz TMA-1/TM-34 (2002)
- Alexey Zubritsky* — (Russia) Soyuz MS-27 (2025)

=== Saudi Arabia ===
- Sultan Salman Al Saud, first Saudi in space. — STS-51-G (1985)
- Ali AlQarni — Axiom Mission 2 (2023)
- Rayyanah Barnawi — Axiom Mission 2 (2023)

=== Slovakia ===
- Ivan Bella, first Slovak in space. — Soyuz TM-29/28 (1999)

=== South Africa ===
- Mark Shuttleworth, second "space tourist" and first South African in space. — Soyuz TM-34/33 (2002)

=== South Korea ===
- Yi So-yeon, Spaceflight participant, first South Korean in space — Soyuz TMA-12/11 (2008)

=== Soviet Union ===
All here listed cosmonauts were citizens of the Soviet Union at the time of at least one of their space flights. The cosmonauts born within republics of the Soviet Union other than the Russian Soviet Republic are marked with an asterisk (*) and their place of birth is shown in an appended list. For cosmonauts of ex-Soviet countries see their dedicated headers. The Soviet space program had no unified space agency, its parts were claimed by different ex-Soviet countries.

==== A ====
- Vladimir Aksyonov — (Soviet Union) Soyuz 22 (1976), Soyuz T-2 (1980)
- Aleksandr Pavlovich Aleksandrov — (Soviet Union) Soyuz T-9 (1983), Soyuz TM-3 (1987)
- Anatoly Artsebarsky* — (Soviet Union) Soyuz TM-12 (1991)
- Yuri Artyukhin (1930–1998) — (Soviet Union) Soyuz 14 (1974)
- Oleg Atkov — (Soviet Union) Soyuz T-10/11 (1984)
- Toktar Aubakirov* — (Soviet Union) Soyuz TM-13/12 (1991)

==== B ====
- Aleksandr Balandin — (Soviet Union) Soyuz TM-9 (1990)
- Pavel Belyayev (1925–1970) — (Soviet Union) Voskhod 2 (1965)
- Georgi Beregovoi* (1921–1995) — (Soviet Union) Soyuz 3 (1968)
- Anatoly Berezovoy (1942–2014) — (Soviet Union) Soyuz T-5/7 (1982)
- Valery Bykovsky — (Soviet Union) Vostok 5 (1963), Soyuz 22 (1976), Soyuz 31/29 (1978)

==== D ====
- Georgi Dobrovolski* (1928–1971), died on reentry. — (Soviet Union) Soyuz 11 (1971)
- Lev Dyomin (1926–1998) — (Soviet Union) Soyuz 15 (1974)
- Vladimir Dzhanibekov* — (Soviet Union) Soyuz 27/26 (1978), Soyuz 39 (1981), Soyuz T-6 (1982), Soyuz T-12 (1984), Soyuz T-13 (1985)

==== F ====
- Konstantin Feoktistov (1926–2009) — (Soviet Union) Voskhod 1 (1964)
- Anatoly Filipchenko — (Soviet Union) Soyuz 7 (1969), Soyuz 16 (1974)

==== G ====
- Yuri Gagarin (1934–1968), first person in space. — (Soviet Union) Vostok 1 (1961)
- Yuri Glazkov (1939–2008) — (Soviet Union) Soyuz 24 (1977)
- Viktor Gorbatko — (Soviet Union) Soyuz 7 (1969), Soyuz 24 (1977), Soyuz 37/36 (1980)
- Georgi Grechko — (Soviet Union) Soyuz 17 (1975), Soyuz 26/27 (1977), Soyuz T-14/13 (1985)
- Aleksei Gubarev — (Soviet Union) Soyuz 17 (1975), Soyuz 28 (1978)

==== I ====
- Aleksandr Ivanchenkov — (Soviet Union) Soyuz 29/31 (1978)

==== K ====
- Yevgeny Khrunov (1933–2000) — (Soviet Union) Soyuz 5/4 (1969)
- Leonid Kizim* (1941–2010) — (Soviet Union) Soyuz T-3 (1980), Soyuz T-10/11 (1984), Soyuz T-15 (1986)
- Pyotr Klimuk* — (Soviet Union) Soyuz 13 (1973), Soyuz 18 (1975), Soyuz 30 (1978)
- Vladimir Komarov (1927–1967), died during reentry of first Soyuz spacecraft. — (Soviet Union) Voskhod 1 (1964), Soyuz 1 (1967)
- Vladimir Kovalyonok* — (Soviet Union) Soyuz 25 (1977), Soyuz 29/31 (1978), Soyuz T-4 (1981)
- Sergei Krikalev, six space flights and, as of 2006, holds record for longest total time in space: 803 days, 9 hours and 39 minutes. — (Soviet Union) Soyuz TM-7 (1988), (Soviet Union) (Russia) Soyuz TM-12/13 (1991), (Russia) STS-60 (1994), STS-88 (1998), Soyuz TM-31/STS-102 (2000), Soyuz TMA-6 (2005)
- Valeri Kubasov — (Soviet Union) Soyuz 6 (1969), Soyuz 19 (1975), Soyuz 36/35 (1980)

==== L ====
- Aleksandr Laveykin — (Soviet Union) Soyuz TM-2 (1987)
- Vasili Lazarev (1928–1990) — (Soviet Union) Soyuz 12 (1973), Soyuz 18a (1975)
- Valentin Lebedev — (Soviet Union) Soyuz 13 (1973), Soyuz T-5/7 (1982)
- Alexsei Leonov, first person to "walk in space" (to make an EVA). — (Soviet Union) Voskhod 2 (1965), Soyuz 19 (1975)
- Anatoli Levchenko* (1941–1988) — (Soviet Union) Soyuz TM-4/3 (1987)
- Vladimir Lyakhov* — (Soviet Union) Soyuz 32/34 (1979), Soyuz T-9 (1983), Soyuz TM-6/5 (1988)

==== M ====
- Oleg Makarov (1933–2003) — (Soviet Union) Soyuz 12 (1973), Soyuz 18a (1975), Soyuz 27/26 (1978), Soyuz T-3 (1980)
- Yury Malyshev (1941–1999) — (Soviet Union) Soyuz T-2 (1980), Soyuz T-11/10 (1984)
- Gennadi Manakov — (Soviet Union) Soyuz TM-10 (1990), (Russia) Soyuz TM-16 (1993)
- Musa Manarov* — (Soviet Union) Soyuz TM-4/6 (1987), Soyuz TM-11 (1990)

==== N ====
- Andriyan Nikolayev (1929–2004), first astronaut of Chuvash descent — (Soviet Union) Vostok 3 (1962), Soyuz 9 (1970)

==== P ====
- Viktor Patsayev* (1933–1971), died in reentry. — (Soviet Union) Soyuz 11 (1971)
- Valeri Polyakov, holds record for single longest spaceflight, 437 days — (Soviet Union) Soyuz TM-6/7 (1988), (Russia) Soyuz TM-18/20 (1994)
- Leonid Popov* — (Soviet Union) Soyuz 35/37 (1980), Soyuz 40 (1981), Soyuz T-7/5 (1982)
- Pavel Popovich* (1930–2009) — (Soviet Union) Vostok 4 (1962), Soyuz 14 (1974)

==== R ====
- Yuri Romanenko — (Soviet Union) Soyuz 26/27 (1977), Soyuz 38 (1980), Soyuz TM-2/3 (1987)
- Valery Rozhdestvensky — (Soviet Union) Soyuz 23 (1976)
- Nikolai Rukavishnikov (1932–2002) — (Soviet Union) Soyuz 10 (1971), Soyuz 16 (1974), Soyuz 33 (1979)
- Valery Ryumin — (Soviet Union) Soyuz 25 (1977), Soyuz 32/34 (1979), Soyuz 35/37 (1980), (Russia) STS-91 (1998)

==== S ====
- Gennadi Sarafanov (1942–2005) — (Soviet Union) Soyuz 15 (1974)
- Viktor Savinykh — (Soviet Union) Soyuz T-4 (1981), Soyuz T-13/14 (1985)
- Svetlana Savitskaya, first woman to walk in space. — (Soviet Union) Soyuz T-7/5 (1982), Soyuz T-12 (1984)
- Aleksandr Serebrov (1944–2013) — (Soviet Union) Soyuz T-7/5 (1982), Soyuz T-8 (1983), Soyuz TM-8 (1989), (Russia) Soyuz TM-17 (1993)
- Vitali Sevastyanov (1935–2010) — (Soviet Union) Soyuz 9 (1970), Soyuz 18 (1975)
- Vladimir Shatalov* — (Soviet Union) Soyuz 4 (1969), Soyuz 8 (1969), Soyuz 10 (1971)
- Georgi Shonin* (1935–1997) — (Soviet Union) Soyuz 6 (1969)
- Anatoly Solovyev* — (Soviet Union) Soyuz TM-5/4 (1988), Soyuz TM-9 (1990), (Russia) Soyuz TM-15 (1992), STS-71/Soyuz TM-21 (1995), Soyuz TM-26 (1997)
- Vladimir Solovyov — (Soviet Union) Soyuz T-10/11 (1984), Soyuz T-15 (1986)
- Gennadi Strekalov (1940–2004) — (Soviet Union) Soyuz T-3 (1980), Soyuz T-8 (1983), Soyuz T-11/10 (1984), Soyuz TM-10 (1990), (Russia) Soyuz TM-21/STS-71 (1995)

==== T ====
- Valentina Tereshkova, first woman in space. — (Soviet Union) Vostok 6 (1963)
- Gherman Titov (1935–2000), the second person to make a space flight and the first to stay up for a day. — (Soviet Union) Vostok 2 (1961)
- Vladimir Titov — (Soviet Union) Soyuz T-8 (1983), Soyuz TM-4/6 (1987), (Russia) STS-63 (1995), STS-86 (1997)

==== V ====
- Vladimir Vasyutin* (1952–2002) — (Soviet Union) Soyuz T-14 (1985)
- Aleksandr Viktorenko* — (Soviet Union) Soyuz TM-3/2 (1987), Soyuz TM-8 (1989), (Russia) Soyuz TM-14 (1992), Soyuz TM-20 (1994)
- Igor Volk* (1937–2017) — (Soviet Union) Soyuz T-12 (1984)
- Alexander Volkov* — (Soviet Union) Soyuz T-14 (1985), Soyuz TM-7 (1988), (Soviet Union) / (Russia) Soyuz TM-13 (1991)
- Vladislav Volkov (1935–1971), died on reentry. — (Soviet Union) Soyuz 7 (1969), Soyuz 11 (1971)
- Boris Volynov — (Soviet Union) Soyuz 5 (1969), Soyuz 21 (1976)

==== Y ====
- Boris Yegorov (1937–1994) — (Soviet Union) Voskhod 1 (1964)
- Aleksei Yeliseyev — (Soviet Union) Soyuz 5/4 (1969), Soyuz 8 (1969), Soyuz 10 (1971)

==== Z ====
- Vitali Zholobov* — (Soviet Union) Soyuz 21 (1976)
- Vyacheslav Zudov — (Soviet Union) Soyuz 23 (1976)

==== Soviet cosmonauts born outside the Russian Soviet Republic ====
===== Azerbaijan SSR / Azerbaijan =====
- Musa Manarov, born in Baku (Soviet Union)

===== Byelorussian SSR / Belarus =====
- Pyotr Klimuk, born in Komarovka (Soviet Union)
- Vladimir Kovalyonok, born in Beloye (Soviet Union)

===== Kazakh SSR / Kazakhstan =====
- Toktar Aubakirov, born in Karaganda (Soviet Union)
- Viktor Patsayev, born in Aktyubinsk (Soviet Union)
- Dmitry Petelin — born in Kostanay (Russia)
- Vladimir Shatalov, born in Petropavlovsk (Soviet Union)
- Aleksandr Viktorenko, born in Olginka (Soviet Union) (Russia)

===== Kirghiz SSR / Kyrgyzstan =====
- Sergey Korsakov, born in Frunze (Russia)

===== Latvian SSR / Latvia =====
- Anatoly Solovyev, born in Riga (Soviet Union) (Russia)

===== Ukrainian SSR / Ukraine =====
- Anatoly Artsebarsky, born in Prosyana (Soviet Union)
- Georgi Beregovoi, born in Federivka (Soviet Union)
- Georgiy Dobrovolskiy, born in Odesa (Soviet Union)
- Leonid Kizim, born in Krasnyi Lyman (Soviet Union)
- Anatoli Levchenko, born in Krasnokutsk (Soviet Union)
- Vladimir Lyakhov, born in Antratsyt (Soviet Union)
- Leonid Popov, born in Oleksandriia (Soviet Union)
- Pavel Popovich, born in Uzyn (Soviet Union)
- Georgi Shonin, born in Rovenky (Soviet Union)
- Vladimir Vasyutin, born in Kharkiv (Soviet Union)
- Igor Volk, born in Zmiiv (Soviet Union)
- Aleksandr Volkov, born in Horlivka (Soviet Union) (Ukraine)
- Vitali Zholobov, born in Zburyivka (Soviet Union)
- Alexey Zubritsky, born in Zaporizhzhia, Ukraine

===== Uzbek SSR / Uzbekistan =====
- Vladimir Dzhanibekov, born in Iskandar (Soviet Union)

=== Syria ===
- Muhammed Faris (Intercosmos), first Syrian in space. — Soyuz TM-3/2 (1987)

=== Turkey ===
- Alper Gezeravcı, first Turk in space. — Axiom Mission 3 (2024)

=== Ukraine ===
- Leonid Kadeniuk, first Ukrainian in space since independence. — STS-87 (1997)
- Soviet cosmonauts born in Ukraine: Anatoly Artsebarsky, Georgi Beregovoi, Georgiy Dobrovolskiy, Leonid Kizim, Anatoli Levchenko, Vladimir Lyakhov, Leonid Popov, Pavel Popovich (first), Georgi Shonin, Vladimir Vasyutin, Igor Volk and Vitali Zholobov flew under the Soviet flag; Ukrainian astronaut born in the United States Heidemarie Stefanyshyn-Piper flew under the American flag

=== United Arab Emirates ===
- Hazza Al Mansouri, first Emirati in space. - Soyuz MS-15/MS-12 (2019)
- Sultan Al Neyadi, first long duration Emirati in space. - SpaceX Crew-6 (2023)

=== United States ===
* Asterisked space travelers were born outside the United States

==== A ====
- Joseph M. Acaba — STS-119 (2009), Soyuz TMA-04M (2012)
- Loren Acton — STS-51-F (1985)
- James C. Adamson — STS-28 (1989), STS-43 (1991)
- Thomas Akers — STS-41 (1990), STS-49 (1992), STS-61 (1993), STS-79 (1996)
- Buzz Aldrin, the second person to walk on the Moon — Gemini 12 (1966), Apollo 11 (1969)
- Andrew M. Allen — STS-46 (1992), STS-62 (1994), STS-75 (1996)
- Joseph P. Allen — STS-5 (1982), STS-51-A (1984)
- Scott Altman — STS-90 (1998), STS-106 (2000), STS-109 (2002), STS-125 (2009)
- William Anders* — Apollo 8 (1968)
- Clayton Anderson — STS-117/120 (2007), STS-131 (2010)
- Michael P. Anderson (1959–2003), died on the Columbia — STS-89 (1998), STS-107 (2003)
- Anousheh Ansari*, fourth space tourist and first female space tourist — Soyuz TMA-9/8 (2006)
- Dominic A. Antonelli — STS-119 (2009), STS-132 (2010)
- Jerome Apt — STS-37 (1991), STS-47 (1992), STS-59 (1994), STS-79 (1996)
- Hayley Arceneaux — Inspiration4 (2021)
- Lee Archambault — STS-117 (2007), STS-119 (2009)
- Neil Armstrong (1930–2012), first person to walk on the Moon — Gemini 8 (1966), Apollo 11 (1969)
- Richard R. Arnold — STS-119 (2009), Soyuz MS-08 (2018)
- Jeffrey Ashby — STS-93 (1999), STS-100 (2001), STS-112 (2002)
- Serena Auñón-Chancellor - Soyuz MS-09 (2018)
- Nichole Ayers — SpaceX Crew-10 (2025)

==== B ====
- James P. Bagian, first person of Armenian descent to have been in space — STS-29 (1989), STS-40 (1991)
- Ellen S. Baker — STS-34 (1989), STS-50 (1992), STS-71 (1995)
- Michael A. Baker — STS-43 (1991), STS-52 (1992), STS-68 (1994), STS-81 (1997)
- Michael R. Barratt — Soyuz TMA-14 (2009), STS-133 (2011), SpaceX Crew-8 (2024)
- Kayla Barron — SpaceX Crew-3 (2021)
- Daniel T. Barry — STS-72 (1996), STS-96 (1999), STS-105 (2001)
- John-David F. Bartoe — STS-51-F (1985)
- Alan Bean — Apollo 12 (1969), Skylab 3 (1973)
- Robert L. Behnken — STS-123 (2008), STS-130 (2010), Crew Dragon Demo-2 (2020)
- John E. Blaha — STS-29 (1989), STS-33 (1989), STS-43 (1991), STS-58 (1993), STS-79 /81 (1996)
- Michael J. Bloomfield — STS-86, STS-97 (2000), STS-110 (2002)
- Guion Bluford, first African-American in space — STS-8 (1983), STS-61-A (1985), STS-39 (1991), STS-53 (1992)
- Karol J. Bobko, first graduate of the United States Air Force Academy to become an astronaut — STS-6 (1983), STS-51-D (1985), STS-51-J (1985)
- Eric A. Boe — STS-126 (2008), STS-133 (2011)
- Charles Bolden — STS-61-C (1985), STS-31 (1990), STS-45 (1992), STS-60 (1994)
- Frank Borman, commanded the first spaceflight to orbit the Moon — Gemini 7 (1965), Apollo 8 (1968)
- Stephen G. Bowen — STS-126 (2008), STS-132 (2010), STS-133 (2011), SpaceX Crew-6 (2023)
- Ken Bowersox — STS-50 (1992), STS-61 (1993), STS-73 (1995), STS-82 (1997), STS-113/Soyuz TMA-1 (2002)
- Charles E. Brady Jr. (1951–2006) — STS-78 (1996)
- Vance D. Brand — Apollo-Soyuz Test Project, STS-5 (1982), STS-41-B (1984), STS-35 (1990)
- Daniel Brandenstein — STS-8 (1983), STS-51-G (1985), STS-32 (1990), STS-49 (1992)
- Randolph Bresnik — STS-129 (2009), Soyuz MS-05 (2017)
- Roy D. Bridges Jr. — STS-51-F (1985)
- Curtis Brown — STS-47 (1992), STS-66 (1994), STS-77 (1996), STS-85 (1997), STS-95 (1998), STS-103 (1999)
- David McDowell Brown (1956–2003), died on the Columbia — STS-107 (2003)
- Mark N. Brown — STS-28 (1989), STS-48 (1991)
- James Buchli — STS-51-C (1985), STS-61-A (1985), STS-29 (1989), STS-48 (1991)
- Jay C. Buckey — STS-90 (1998)
- Daniel C. Burbank — STS-106 (2000), STS-115 (2006), Soyuz TMA-22 (2011)
- Daniel W. Bursch — STS-51 (1993), STS-68 (1994), STS-77 (1996), STS-108 (2001), STS-111 (2002)

==== C ====
- Robert D. Cabana — STS-41 (1990), STS-53 (1992), STS-65 (1994), STS-88 (1998)
- Charles Camarda — STS-114 (2005)
- Kenneth D. Cameron — STS-37 (1991), STS-56 (1993), STS-74 (1995)
- Zena Cardman — SpaceX Crew-11 (2025)
- Duane G. Carey — STS-109 (2002)
- Scott Carpenter (1925–2013) — Mercury 7 (1962)
- Gerald P. Carr — Skylab 4 (1973)
- Sonny Carter (1947–1991) — STS-33 (1989)
- John Casper — STS-36 (1990), STS-54 (1993), STS-62 (1994), STS-77 (1996)
- Josh A. Cassada — SpaceX Crew-5 (2022)
- Christopher Cassidy — STS-127 (2009), Soyuz TMA-08M (2013), Soyuz MS-16 (2020)
- Robert J. Cenker — STS-61-C (1985)
- Gene Cernan (1934–2017) — Gemini 9A (1966), Apollo 10 (1969), Apollo 17 (1972)
- Gregory Chamitoff* — STS-124/126 (2008), STS-134 (2011)
- Franklin Chang-Diaz* — STS-61-C (1985), STS-34 (1989), STS-46 (1992), STS-60 (1994), STS-75 (1996), STS-91 (1998), STS-111 (2002)
- Raja Chari — SpaceX Crew-3 (2021)
- Kalpana Chawla* (1961–2003), died on the Columbia — STS-87 (1997), STS-107 (2003)
- Leroy Chiao — STS-65 (1994), STS-72 (1996), STS-92 (2000), Soyuz TMA-5 (2004)
- Kevin P. Chilton — STS-49 (1992), STS-59 (1994), STS-76 (1996)
- Laurel Clark (1961–2003), died on the Columbia — STS-107 (2003)
- Mary L. Cleave — STS-61-B (1985), STS-30 (1989)
- Michael R. Clifford — STS-53 (1992), STS-59 (1994), STS-76 (1996)
- Michael Coats — STS-41-D (1984), STS-29 (1989), STS-39 (1991)
- Kenneth Cockrell — STS-56 (1993), STS-69 (1995), STS-80 (1996), STS-98 (2001), STS-111 (2002)
- Catherine Coleman — STS-73 (1995), STS-93 (1999), Soyuz TMA-20 (2010)
- Eileen Collins — STS-63 (1995), STS-84 (1997), STS-93 (1999), STS-114 (2005)
- Michael Collins* (1930–2021) — Gemini 10 (1966), Apollo 11 (1969)
- Larry Connor, Axiom Mission 1 (2022)
- Pete Conrad (1930–1999) — Gemini 5 (1965), Gemini 11 (1966), Apollo 12 (1969), Skylab 2 (1973)
- Gordon Cooper (1927–2004), the first American to fly in space for a day and first person to go into orbit twice — Mercury 9 (1963), Gemini 5 (1965)
- Richard O. Covey — STS-51-I (1985), STS-26 (1988), STS-38 (1990), STS-61 (1993)
- Timothy Creamer — Soyuz TMA-17 (2009)
- John Oliver Creighton — STS-51-G (1985), STS-36 (1990), STS-48 (1991)
- Robert Crippen, flew on first Space Shuttle mission — STS-1 (1981), STS-7 (1983), STS-41-C (1984), STS-41-G (1984)
- Roger K. Crouch — STS-83 (1997), STS-94 (1997)
- Frank L. Culbertson Jr. — STS-38 (1990), STS-51 (1993), STS-105/108 (2001)
- Walter Cunningham — Apollo 7 (1968)
- Robert Curbeam — STS-85 (1997), STS-98 (2001), STS-116 (2006)
- Nancy Currie — STS-57 (1993), STS-70 (1995), STS-88 (1998), STS-109 (2002)
- Christina Koch — Soyuz MS-12 (2019), Artemis II (2026)

==== D ====
- Jan Davis — STS-47 (1992), STS-60 (1994), STS-85 (1997)
- Lawrence J. DeLucas — STS-50 (1992)
- Matthew Dominick — SpaceX Crew-8
- B. Alvin Drew — STS-118 (2007), STS-133 (2011)
- Brian Duffy — STS-45 (1992), STS-57 (1993), STS-72 (1996), STS-92 (2000)
- Charles Moss Duke Jr. — Apollo 16 (1972)
- Bonnie J. Dunbar — STS-61-A (1985), STS-32 (1990), STS-50 (1992), STS-71 (1995), STS-89 (1998)
- Samuel T. Durrance — STS-35 (1990), STS-67 (1995)
- James Dutton — STS-131 (2010)
- Tracy Caldwell Dyson — STS-118 (2007), Soyuz TMA-18 (2010), Soyuz MS-25 (2024)

==== E ====
- Joe F. Edwards Jr. — STS-89 (1998)
- Donn F. Eisele (1930–1987) — Apollo 7 (1968)
- Anthony W. England — STS-51-F (1985)
- Joseph Henry Engle (1932–2024) — STS-2 (1981), STS-51-I (1985)
- Jeanette J. Epps — SpaceX Crew-8 (2024)
- Ronald Evans (1933–1990) — Apollo 17 (1972)

==== F ====
- John M. Fabian — STS-7 (1983), STS-51-G (1985)
- Christopher Ferguson — STS-115 (2006), STS-126 (2008), STS-135 (2011)
- Martin J. Fettman — STS-58 (1993)
- Andrew J. Feustel — STS-125 (2009), STS-134 (2011) & Soyuz MS-08 (2018)
- Michael Fincke — Soyuz TMA-4 (2004), Soyuz TMA-13 (2008), STS-134 (2011), SpaceX Crew-11 (2025)
- Jack D. Fischer — Soyuz MS-04 (2017)
- Anna Lee Fisher — STS-51-A (1984)
- William Frederick Fisher — STS-51-I (1985)
- Michael Foale* — STS-45 (1992), STS-56 (1993), STS-63 (1995), STS-84/86 (1997), STS-103 (1999), Soyuz TMA-3 (2003)
- Kevin A. Ford — STS-128 (2009), Soyuz TMA-06M (2012)
- Michael Foreman — STS-123 (2008), STS-129 (2009)
- Patrick G. Forrester — STS-105 (2001), STS-117 (2007), STS-128 (2009)
- Michael E. Fossum — STS-121 (2006), STS-124 (2008), Soyuz TMA-01M (2011)
- Stephen Frick — STS-110 (2002), STS-122 (2008)
- C. Gordon Fullerton (1936–2013) — STS-3 (1982), STS-51-F (1985)

==== G ====
- F. Drew Gaffney — STS-40 (1991)
- Ronald J. Garan Jr. — STS-124 (2008), Soyuz TMA-21 (2011)
- Dale Gardner — STS-8 (1983), STS-51-A (1984)
- Guy Gardner — STS-27 (1988), STS-35 (1990)
- Jake Garn, U. S. Senator at time of flight, first politician in space — STS-51-D (1985)
- Owen K. Garriott — Skylab 3 (1973), STS-9 (1983)
- Richard Garriott*, space tourist — Soyuz TMA-13 /12 (2008)
- Charles D. Gemar — STS-38 (1990), STS-48 (1991), STS-62 (1994)
- Michael L. Gernhardt — STS-69 (1995), STS-83 (1997), STS-94 (1997), STS-104 (2001)
- Edward Gibson — Skylab 4 (1973)
- Robert L. Gibson — STS-41-B (1984), STS-61-C (1985), STS-27 (1988), STS-47 (1992), STS-71 (1995)
- Sarah Gillis — Polaris Dawn (2024)
- John Glenn (1921–2016), first American in Earth orbit and US Senator — Mercury 6 (1962), STS-95 (1998)
- Victor Glover — SpaceX Crew-1 (2020), Artemis II (2026)
- Linda M. Godwin — STS-37 (1991), STS-59 (1994), STS-76 (1996), STS-108 (2001)
- Michael T. Good — STS-125 (2009), STS-132 (2010)
- Richard F. Gordon Jr. — Gemini 11 (1966), Apollo 12 (1969)
- Dominic L. Pudwill Gorie — STS-91 (1998), STS-99 (2000), STS-108 (2001), STS-123 (2008)
- Ronald J. Grabe — STS-51-J (1985), STS-30 (1989), STS-42 (1992), STS-57 (1993)
- Frederick D. Gregory — STS-51-B (1985), STS-33 (1989), STS-44 (1991)
- William G. Gregory — STS-67 (1995)
- S. David Griggs (1939–1989) — STS-51-D (1985)
- Gus Grissom (1926–1967) — Gemini 3 (1965). Also flew suborbitally in Mercury 4 (1961). Died in the Apollo 1 (1967) (1967) launchpad fire
- John M. Grunsfeld — STS-67 (1995), STS-81 (1997), STS-103 (1999), STS-109 (2002), STS-125 (2009)
- Sidney M. Gutierrez — STS-40 (1991), STS-59 (1994)

==== H ====
- Nick Hague — Soyuz MS-10 (2018), Soyuz MS-12 (2019), SpaceX Crew-9 (2024)
- Fred Haise — Apollo 13 (1970)
- James D. Halsell — STS-65 (1994), STS-74 (1995), STS-83 (1997), STS-94 (1997), STS-101 (2000)
- Kenneth Ham — STS-124 (2008), STS-132 (2010)
- L. Blaine Hammond — STS-39 (1991), STS-64 (1994)
- Gregory J. Harbaugh — STS-39 (1991), STS-54 (1993), STS-71 (1995), STS-82 (1997)
- Bernard A. Harris Jr., first African-American to walk in space. — STS-55 (1993), STS-63 (1995)
- Terry Hart — STS-41-C (1984)
- Henry Hartsfield — STS-4 (1982), STS-41-D (1984), STS-61-A (1985)
- Frederick Hauck — STS-7 (1983), STS-51-A (1984), STS-26 (1988)
- Steven Hawley — STS-41-D (1984), STS-61-C (1985), STS-31 (1990), STS-82 (1997), STS-93 (1999)
- Mark T. Vande Hei — Soyuz MS-06 (2017), Soyuz MS-18 (2021)
- Susan J. Helms — STS-54 (1993), STS-64 (1994), STS-78 (1996), STS-101 (2000), STS-102/105 (2001)
- Karl Gordon Henize (1926–1993) — STS-51-F (1985)
- Thomas J. Hennen — STS-44 (1991)
- Terence T. Henricks — STS-44 (1991), STS-55 (1993), STS-70 (1995), STS-78 (1996)
- José M. Hernández — STS-128 (2009)
- John Herrington, first Native American in space. — STS-113 (2002)
- Richard Hieb — STS-39 (1991), STS-49 (1992), STS-65 (1994)
- Joan Higginbotham — STS-116 (2006)
- David C. Hilmers — STS-51-J (1985), STS-26 (1988), STS-36 (1990), STS-42 (1992)
- Robert Hines —SpaceX Crew-4 (2022)
- Kathryn P. Hire — STS-90 (1998), STS-130 (2010)
- Charles O. Hobaugh — STS-104 (2001), STS-108 (2001), STS-129 (2009)
- Jeffrey A. Hoffman — STS-51-D (1985), STS-35 (1990), STS-46 (1992), STS-61 (1993), STS-75 (1996)
- Warren Hoburg — SpaceX Crew-6 (2023)
- Michael S. Hopkins — Soyuz TMA-10M (2013), SpaceX Crew-1 (2020)
- Scott J. Horowitz — STS-75 (1996), STS-82 (1997), STS-101 (2000), STS-105 (2001)
- Millie Hughes-Fulford, first female Payload Specialist — STS-40 (1991)
- Douglas G. Hurley — STS-127 (2009), STS-135 (2011), Crew Dragon Demo-2 (2020)
- Rick Husband (1957–2003), died on the Columbia — STS-96 (1999), STS-107 (2003)

==== I ====
- James Irwin (1930–1991) — Apollo 15 (1971)
- Jared Isaacman — Inspiration4 (2021), Polaris Dawn (2024)
- Marsha Ivins — STS-32 (1990), STS-46 (1992), STS-62 (1994), STS-81 (1997), STS-98 (2001)

==== J ====
- Mae Jemison, first African-American woman in space — STS-47 (1992)
- Tamara E. Jernigan — STS-40 (1991), STS-52 (1992), STS-67 (1995), STS-80 (1996), STS-96 (1999)
- Brent W. Jett Jr. — STS-72 (1996), STS-81 (1997), STS-97 (2000), STS-115 (2006)
- Gregory C. Johnson — STS-125 (2009)
- Gregory H. Johnson* — STS-123 (2008), STS-134 (2011)
- Thomas David Jones — STS-59 (1994), STS-68 (1994), STS-80 (1996), STS-98 (2001)

==== K ====
- Janet L. Kavandi — STS-91 (1998), STS-99 (2000), STS-104 (2001)
- James M. Kelly — STS-102 (2001), STS-114 (2005)
- Mark E. Kelly — STS-108 (2001), STS-121 (2006), STS-124 (2008), STS-134 (2011). Twin brother of Scott J. Kelly.
- Scott J. Kelly — STS-103 (1999), STS-118 (2007), Soyuz TMA-01M (2010), Soyuz TMA-16M (2015). Twin brother of Mark Kelly.
- Johnny Kim — Soyuz MS-27 (2025)
- Joseph P. Kerwin — Skylab 2 (1973)
- R. Shane Kimbrough — STS-126 (2008), Soyuz MS-02 (2016), SpaceX Crew-2 (2021)
- Timothy L. Kopra — STS-127 /128 (2009), Soyuz TMA-19M (2015)
- Kevin R. Kregel — STS-70 (1995), STS-78 (1996), STS-87 (1997), STS-99 (2000)

==== L ====
- Wendy B. Lawrence — STS-67 (1995), STS-86, STS-91 (1998), STS-114 (2005)
- Mark C. Lee — STS-30 (1989), STS-47 (1992), STS-64 (1994), STS-82 (1997)
- David Leestma — STS-41-G (1984), STS-28 (1989), STS-45 (1992)
- William B. Lenoir (1939–2010) — STS-5 (1982)
- Frederick W. Leslie* — STS-73 (1995)
- Byron Lichtenberg, first NASA Payload Specialist. — STS-9 (1983), STS-45 (1992)
- Don L. Lind — STS-51-B (1985)
- Kjell N. Lindgren* — Soyuz TMA-17M (2015), SpaceX Crew-4 (2022)
- Steven W. Lindsey — STS-87 (1997), STS-95 (1998), STS-104 (2001), STS-121 (2006), STS-133 (2011), SpaceX Crew-4 (2022)
- Jerry M. Linenger — STS-64 (1994), STS-81/84 (1997)
- Richard M. Linnehan — STS-78 (1996), STS-90, STS-109 (2002), STS-123 (2008)
- Gregory Linteris — STS-83 (1997), STS-94 (1997)
- Paul Lockhart — STS-111 (2002), STS-113 (2002)
- Michael Lopez-Alegria* — STS-73 (1995), STS-92 (2000), STS-113 (2002), Soyuz TMA-9 (2006), Axiom Mission 1 (2022), Axiom Mission 3 (2024)
- John M. Lounge — STS-51-I (1985), STS-26 (1988), STS-35 (1990)
- Jack R. Lousma — Skylab 3 (1973), STS-3 (1982)
- Stanley G. Love — STS-122 (2008)
- Jim Lovell — Gemini 7 (1965), Gemini 12 (1966), Apollo 8 (1968), Apollo 13 (1970)
- G. David Low (1956–2008) — STS-32 (1990), STS-43 (1991), STS-57 (1993)
- Ed Lu — STS-84 (1997), STS-106 (2000), Soyuz TMA-1 (2003)
- Shannon Lucid* — STS-51-G (1985), STS-34 (1989), STS-43 (1991), STS-58 (1993), STS-76/79 (1996)

==== M ====
- Sandra Magnus — STS-112 (2002), STS-126 /119 (2008), STS-135 (2011)
- Nicole Aunapu Mann — SpaceX Crew-5 (2022)
- Thomas Marshburn — STS-127 (2009), Soyuz TMA-07M (2012), SpaceX Crew-3 (2021)
- Michael Massimino — STS-109 (2002), STS-125 (2009)
- Richard Mastracchio — STS-106 (2000), STS-118 (2007), STS-131 (2010), Soyuz TMA-11M (2013)
- Ken Mattingly — Apollo 16 (1972), STS-4 (1982), STS-51-C (1985)
- K. Megan McArthur — STS-125 (2009), SpaceX Crew-2 (2021)
- William S. McArthur — STS-58 (1993), STS-74 (1995), STS-92 (2000), Soyuz TMA-7 (2005)
- Jon McBride — STS-41-G (1984)
- Bruce McCandless II (1937–2017) — STS-41-B (1984), STS-31 (1990)
- William C. McCool (1961–2003), died on the Columbia — STS-107 (2003)
- Anne McClain — Soyuz MS-11 (2018), SpaceX Crew-10 (2025)
- Michael J. McCulley — STS-34 (1989)
- James McDivitt — Gemini 4 (1965), Apollo 9 (1969)
- Donald R. McMonagle — STS-39 (1991), STS-54 (1993), STS-66 (1994)
- Ronald McNair (1950–1986), died on the Challenger — STS-41-B (1984)
- Carl J. Meade — STS-38 (1990), STS-50 (1992), STS-64 (1994)
- Jessica Meir — Soyuz MS-15 (2019)
- Bruce E. Melnick — STS-41 (1990), STS-49 (1992)
- Pamela Melroy — STS-92 (2000), STS-112 (2002), STS-120 (2007)
- Leland D. Melvin — STS-122 (2008), STS-129 (2009)
- Anna Menon — Polaris Dawn (2024)
- Dorothy M. Metcalf-Lindenburger — STS-131 (2010)
- Edgar Mitchell (1930–2016) — Apollo 14 (1971)
- Jasmin Moghbeli — SpaceX Crew-7 (2023)
- Andrew R. Morgan — Soyuz MS-13/MS-15 (2019)
- Barbara Morgan — STS-118 (2007)
- Lee M.E. Morin — STS-110 (2002)
- Richard Mullane — STS-41-D (1984), STS-27 (1988), STS-36 (1990)
- Story Musgrave — STS-6 (1983), STS-51-F (1985), STS-33 (1989), STS-44 (1991), STS-61 (1993), STS-80 (1996)

==== N ====
- Steven R. Nagel — STS-51-G (1985), STS-61-A (1985), STS-37 (1991), STS-55 (1993)
- George Nelson — STS-41-C (1984), STS-61-C (1985), STS-26 (1988)
- Bill Nelson — STS-61-C (1985)
- James H. Newman* — STS-51 (1993), STS-69 (1995), STS-88 (1998), STS-109 (2002)
- Carlos I. Noriega* — STS-84 (1997), STS-97 (2000)
- Lisa Nowak — STS-121 (2006)
- Karen L. Nyberg — STS-124 (2008), Soyuz TMA-09M (2013)

==== O ====
- Bryan D. O'Connor — STS-61-B (1985), STS-40 (1991)
- Ellen Ochoa, first Hispanic woman in space — STS-56 (1993), STS-66 (1994), STS-96 (1999), STS-110 (2002)
- William Oefelein — STS-116 (2006)
- Loral O'Hara — Soyuz MS-24 (2023)
- John D. Olivas — STS-117 (2007), STS-128 (2009)
- Gregory Olsen, third space tourist — Soyuz TMA-7/6 (2005)
- Ellison Onizuka (1946–1986), died on the Challenger — STS-51-C (1985)
- Stephen S. Oswald — STS-42 (1992), STS-56 (1993), STS-67 (1995)
- Robert F. Overmyer (1936–1996) — STS-5 (1982), STS-51-B (1985)

==== P ====
- William Pailes — STS-51-J (1985)
- Scott E. Parazynski — STS-66 (1994), STS-86 (1997), STS-95 (1998), STS-100 (2001), STS-120 (2007)
- Ronald A. Parise (1951–2008) — STS-35 (1990), STS-67 (1995)
- Robert A. Parker — STS-9 (1983), STS-35 (1990)
- Nicholas Patrick* — STS-116 (2006), STS-130 (2010)
- James Pawelczyk — STS-90 (1998)
- Gary Payton — STS-51-C (1985)
- Donald H. Peterson — STS-6 (1983)
- Donald Pettit — STS-113/Soyuz TMA-1 (2002), STS-126 (2008), Soyuz TMA-03M (2011), Soyuz MS-26 (2024)
- John L. Phillips — STS-100 (2001), Soyuz TMA-6 (2005), STS-119 (2009)
- William R. Pogue — Skylab 4 (1973)
- Alan G. Poindexter (1961–2012) — STS-122 (2008), STS-131 (2010)
- Mark L. Polansky — STS-98 (2001), STS-116 (2006), STS-127 (2009)
- Scott Poteet — Polaris Dawn (2024)
- Charles J. Precourt — STS-55 (1993), STS-71 (1995), STS-84 (1997), STS-91 (1998)
- Sian Proctor — Inspiration4 (2021)

==== R ====
- William F. Readdy — STS-42 (1992), STS-51 (1993), STS-79 (1996)
- Kenneth S. Reightler Jr. — STS-48 (1991), STS-60 (1994)
- James F. Reilly — STS-89 (1998), STS-104 (2001), STS-117 (2007)
- Garrett Reisman — STS-123/124 (2008), STS-132 (2010)
- Judith Resnik (1949–1986), died on the Challenger — STS-41-D (1984)
- Paul W. Richards — STS-102 (2001)
- Richard N. Richards — STS-28 (1989), STS-41 (1990), STS-50 (1992), STS-64 (1994)
- Sally Ride (1951–2012), first American woman in space — STS-7 (1983), STS-41-G (1984)
- Stephen Robinson — STS-85 (1997), STS-95 (1998), STS-114 (2005), STS-130 (2010)
- Kent Rominger — STS-73 (1995), STS-80 (1996), STS-85 (1997), STS-96 (1999), STS-100 (2001)
- Stuart Roosa (1933–1994) — Apollo 14 (1971)
- Jerry L. Ross — STS-61-B (1985), STS-27 (1988), STS-37 (1991), STS-55 (1993), STS-74 (1995), STS-88 (1998), STS-110 (2002)
- Kathleen Rubins — Soyuz MS-01 (2016)
- Francisco Rubio — Soyuz MS-22/MS-23 (2022)
- Mario Runco Jr. — STS-44 (1991), STS-54 (1993), STS-77 (1996)

==== S ====
- Albert Sacco — STS-73 (1995)
- Robert Satcher‚ STS-129 (2009)
- Wally Schirra (1923–2007) — Mercury 8 (1962), Gemini 6A (1965), Apollo 7 (1968)
- Harrison Schmitt (The last, 12th man, who arrived and set foot on the Moon)— Apollo 17 (1972)
- Rusty Schweickart — Apollo 9 (1969)
- Dick Scobee (1939–1986), died on the Challenger — STS-41-C (1984)
- David Scott — Gemini 8 (1966), Apollo 9 (1969), Apollo 15 (1971)
- Winston E. Scott — STS-72 (1996), STS-87 (1997)
- Paul D. Scully-Power* — STS-41-G (1984)
- Richard A. Searfoss — STS-58 (1993), STS-76 (1996), STS-90 (1998)
- Margaret Rhea Seddon — STS-51-D (1985), STS-40 (1991), STS-58 (1993)
- Ronald Sega — STS-60 (1994), STS-76 (1996)
- Piers Sellers* (1955–2016) — STS-112 (2002), STS-121 (2006), STS-132 (2010)
- Christopher Sembroski — Inspiration4 (2021)
- Brewster H. Shaw — STS-9 (1983), STS-61-B (1985), STS-28 (1989)
- Alan Shepard (1923–1998), first American in space — Apollo 14 (1971). Also flew suborbitally in Mercury 3 (1961).
- William Shepherd — STS-27 (1988), STS-41 (1990), STS-52 (1992), Soyuz TM-31 /STS-102 (2001)
- Nancy Sherlock – see Nancy Currie
- John Shoffner — Axiom Mission 2 (2023)
- Loren Shriver — STS-51-C (1985), STS-31 (1990), STS-46 (1992)
- Charles Simonyi*, fifth space tourist — Soyuz TMA-10/9 (2007), Soyuz TMA-14/13 (2009)
- Deke Slayton (1924–1993) — Apollo-Soyuz Test Project (1975)
- Steven Smith — STS-68 (1994), STS-82 (1997), STS-103 (1999), STS-110 (2002)
- Sherwood C. Spring — STS-61-B (1985)
- Robert C. Springer — STS-29 (1989), STS-38 (1990)
- Thomas Patten Stafford — Gemini 6A (1965), Gemini 9A (1966), Apollo 10 (1969), Apollo-Soyuz Test Project (1975)
- Heidemarie M. Stefanyshyn-Piper — STS-115 (2006), STS-126 (2008)
- Robert L. Stewart — STS-41-B (1984), STS-51-J (1985)
- Susan Still — STS-83 (1997), STS-94 (1997)
- Nicole P. Stott — STS-128/129 (2009), STS-133 (2011)
- Frederick Sturckow — STS-88 (1998), STS-105 (2001), STS-117 (2007), STS-128 (2009)
- Kathryn Dwyer Sullivan, first American woman to walk in space — STS-41-G (1984), STS-31 (1990), STS-45 (1992)
- Steven Swanson — STS-117 (2007), STS-119 (2009), Soyuz TMA-12M (2014)
- John "Jack" Swigert (1931–1982) — Apollo 13 (1970)

==== T ====
- Daniel Tani — STS-108 (2001), STS-120/122 (2007)
- Joseph R. Tanner — STS-66 (1994), STS-82 (1997), STS-97 (2000), STS-115 (2006)
- Norman Thagard — STS-7 (1983), STS-51-B (1985), STS-30 (1989), STS-42 (1992), Soyuz TM-21/STS-71 (1995)
- Andy Thomas* — STS-77 (1996), STS-89 (1998), STS-91 (1998), STS-102 (2001), STS-114 (2005)
- Donald A. Thomas — STS-65 (1994), STS-70 (1995), STS-83 (1997), STS-94 (1997)
- Kathryn C. Thornton, first woman to make multiple EVAs — STS-33 (1989), STS-49 (1992), STS-61 (1993), STS-73 (1995)
- William E. Thornton — STS-8 (1983), STS-51-B (1985)
- Pierre Thuot — STS-36 (1990), STS-49 (1992), STS-62 (1994)
- Scott D. Tingle — Soyuz MS-07 (2017)
- Dennis Tito, first space tourist — Soyuz TM-32/31 (2001)
- Eugene Trinh* — STS-50 (1992)
- Richard H. Truly — STS-2 (1981), STS-8 4 (1983)

==== V ====
- Lodewijk van den Berg* — STS-51-B (1985)
- James van Hoften — STS-41-C (1984), STS-51-I (1985)
- Charles Veach (1944–1995) — STS-39 (1991), STS-52 (1992)
- Terry Virts — STS-130 (2010), Soyuz TMA-15M (2014)
- James S. Voss — STS-44 (1991), STS-53 (1992), STS-69 (1995), STS-101 (2000), STS-102/105 (2001)
- Janice E. Voss (1956–2012) — STS-57 (1993), STS-63 (1995), STS-83 (1997), STS-94 (1997), STS-99 (2000)

==== W ====
- Rex J. Walheim — STS-110 (2002), STS-122 (2008), STS-135 (2011)
- Charles Walker — STS-41-D (1984), STS-51-D (1985), STS-61-B (1985)
- David M. Walker (1944–2001) — STS-51-A (1984), STS-30 (1989), STS-53 (1992), STS-69 (1995)
- Shannon Walker — Soyuz TMA-19 (2010), SpaceX Crew-1 (2020)
- Carl Walz — STS-51 (1993), STS-65 (1994), STS-79 (1996), STS-108/111 (2001)
- Taylor Wang* — STS-51-B (1985)
- Mary E. Weber — STS-70 (1995), STS-101 (2000)
- Jessica Watkins — SpaceX Crew-4 (2022)
- Paul J. Weitz — Skylab 2, STS-6 (1983)
- Jim Wetherbee — STS-32 (1990), STS-52 (1992), STS-63 (1995), STS-86, STS-102 (2001), STS-113 (2002)
- Douglas H. Wheelock — STS-120 (2007), Soyuz TMA-19 (2010)
- Ed White (1930–1967), first American to perform an EVA. Died in the Apollo 1 (1967) (1967) disaster — Gemini 4 (1965)
- Peggy Whitson, holds the American record for time spent in space — STS-111/113 (2002), Soyuz TMA-11 (2007), Soyuz MS-03/MS-04 (2016), Axiom Mission 2 (2023), Axiom Mission 4 (2025)
- Terrence Wilcutt — STS-68 (1994), STS-79 (1996), STS-89 (1998), STS-106 (2000)
- Donald Williams — STS-51-D (1985), STS-34 (1989)
- Jeffrey Williams — STS-101 (2000), Soyuz TMA-8 (2006), Soyuz TMA-16 (2009), Soyuz TMA-20M (2016)
- Sunita Williams, holder of the women's spacewalk record — STS-116/117 (2006), Soyuz TMA-05M (2012), Boeing CFT/SpaceX Crew-9 (2024)
- Barry E. Wilmore — STS-129 (2009), Soyuz TMA-14M (2014), Boeing CFT/SpaceX Crew-9 (2024)
- Stephanie Wilson — STS-121 (2006), STS-120 (2007), STS-131 (2010)
- Reid Wiseman — Soyuz TMA-13M (2014), Artemis II (2026)
- Peter Wisoff — STS-57 (1993), STS-68 (1994), STS-81 (1997), STS-92 (2000)
- David Wolf — STS-58 (1993), STS-86/89, STS-112 (2002), STS-127 (2009)
- Alfred Worden — Apollo 15 (1971)

==== Y ====
- John Young (1930–2018) — Gemini 3 (1965), Gemini 10 (1966), Apollo 10 (1969), Apollo 16 (1972), STS-1 (1981), STS-9 (1983)

==== Z ====
- George D. Zamka — STS-120 (2007), STS-130 (2010)

==== Americans born abroad ====
1. William Anders, born in Hong Kong to American parents.
2. Fernando Caldeiro, born in Ituzaingó, Argentina.
3. Gregory Chamitoff, born in Montreal, Quebec, Canada.
4. Michael Collins, born in Rome, Italy to American parents.
5. (United Kingdom) Richard Garriott, born in Cambridge, England.
6. (United Kingdom) Gregory H. Johnson, born in South Ruislip, England.
7. Frederick W. Leslie, born in Ancón, Panama Canal Zone (now Panama).
8. Kjell N. Lindgren, born in Taipei, Taiwan.
9. Shannon Lucid, born in Shanghai, China (then under Japanese rule) to American parents.
10. James H. Newman, born in the United Nations Trust Territory of the Pacific Islands (now Micronesia).
11. Jasmin Moghbeli, born in Bad Nauheim, West Germany.'

==== Naturalized Americans ====
1. Anousheh Ansari, born in Mashhad, Iran. First Iranian-American in space. Fourth space tourist and first female space tourist.
2. Sirisha Bandla, born in Guntur, India.
3. Franklin Chang-Diaz, born in San José, Costa Rica. First Costa Rican-American in space.
4. Kalpana Chawla, born in Karnal, India. First Indian-American in space.
5. (United Kingdom) Michael Foale, born in Louth, England, dual British and American citizen.
6. Michael Lopez-Alegria, born in Madrid, Spain.
7. Carlos I. Noriega, born in Lima, Peru. First Peruvian-born person in space.
8. (United Kingdom) Nicholas Patrick, born in Saltburn-by-the-Sea, England, dual UK-US citizen.
9. Paul Scully-Power, born in Sydney, Australia.
10. (United Kingdom) Piers Sellers, born in Crowborough, England, dual UK-US citizen.
11. Charles Simonyi, born in Budapest, Hungary. Fifth space tourist.
12. Andrew Thomas, born in Adelaide, Australia.
13. (South Vietnam) Eugene Trinh, born in Saigon, State of Vietnam (now Ho Chi Minh City, Vietnam). First Vietnamese-American in space.
14. Lodewijk van den Berg, born in Sluiskil, Netherlands.
15. Taylor Wang, born in Shanghai, China. First Chinese American in space.

=== Vietnam ===
- Phạm Tuân (Intercosmos), first Vietnamese and first Asian in space. — Soyuz 37 (1980)/36 (1980)

== Suborbital space fliers ==
Fliers marked with an asterisk flew into the upper atmosphere between 80 and 100 kilometres (50 and 62 mi), which counts as space flight by United States guidelines. Those without flew above 100 kilometres (62 mi), which counts as a space flight by Fédération Aéronautique Internationale guidelines.

=== Antigua and Barbuda ===
- Keisha Schahaff* — Galactic 02 (2023)
- Anastatia Mayers* — Galactic 02 (2023)

=== Austria ===
- Franz Haider* — Galactic 06 (2024)

=== Australia ===
- Chris Boshuizen — Blue Origin NS-18 (2021)
- Elaine Chia Hyde — Blue Origin NS-30 (2025)
- Russell Wilson — Blue Origin NS-30 (2025)

=== Brazil ===
- Victor Correa Hespanha — Blue Origin NS-21 (2022)

=== Canada ===
- William Shatner — Blue Origin NS-18 (2021)
- Jameel Janjua* — Galactic 07 (2024)
- Henry (Hank) Wolfond — Blue Origin NS-28 (2024)
- Jesse Williams — Blue Origin NS-32 (2025)

=== Egypt ===
- Sara Sabry — Blue Origin NS-22 (2022)

=== France ===
- Sylvain Chiron — Blue Origin NS-25 (2024)

=== India ===
- Gopichand Thotakura, first space tourist from India. — Blue Origin NS-25 (2024)

=== Israel ===
- Ephraim Rabin, — Blue Origin NS-26 (2024)

=== Italy ===
- Nicola Pecile* — Galactic 01 (2023), Galactic 03 (2023), Galactic 06 (2024), Galactic 07 (2024)
- Pantaleone Carlucci* — Galactic 01 (2023)
- Walter Villadei* — Galactic 01 (2023); also orbited
- Angelo Landolfi* — Galactic 01 (2023)
- Ketty Maisonrouge* — Galactic 05 (2023)
- Giorgio Manenti* — Galactic 07 (2024)

=== Kazakhstan ===
- Danna Karagussova — Blue Origin NS-36 (2025)

=== Netherlands ===
- Oliver Daemen — Blue Origin NS-16 (2021)

=== New Zealand ===
- Mark Rocket — Blue Origin NS-32 (2025)

=== Nigeria ===
- Owolabi Salis — Blue Origin NS-33 (2025)

=== Pakistan ===
- Namira Salim — Galactic 04 (2023)

=== Panama ===
- Jaime Alemán — Blue Origin NS-32 (2025)

=== Puerto Rico ===
- Aymette (Amy) Medina Jorge — Blue Origin NS-32 (2025)
- Deborah Martorell — Blue Origin NS-34 (2025)

=== Portugal ===
- Mário Ferreira — Blue Origin NS-22 (2022)

=== Saint Kitts and Nevis ===
- H. E. Justin Sun — Blue Origin NS-34 (2025)

=== Singapore ===
- Nicolina Elrick, first astronaut / space tourist, representing Singapore. — Blue Origin NS-26 (2024)

=== South Africa ===
- Timothy Nash* — Galactic 03 (2023)

=== Spain ===
- Jesús Calleja — Blue Origin NS-30 (2025)

=== Turkey ===
- Tuva Cihangir Atasever* — Galactic 07 (2024)
- Gökhan Erdem — Blue Origin NS-34 (2025)

=== Ukraine ===
- Lina Borozdina* (US citizen, flew under both flags) — Galactic 06 (2024)
- Eugene Grin — Blue Origin NS-26 (2024)
- Vitalii Ostrovsky — Blue Origin NS-36 (2025)

=== Union of Soviet Socialist Republics ===
The Soviet Union never launched a spaceflight intended as suborbital. The following people were launched aboard Soyuz 7K-T No.39 (also Soyuz 18a), which was intended as orbital, but aborted before reaching orbit.

- Vasily Lazarev (1928–1990) — Soyuz 18a (1975); also orbited aboard Soyuz 12 (1973)
- Oleg Grigoryevich Makarov (1933–2003) — Soyuz 18a (1975); also orbited aboard Soyuz 12 (1973), Soyuz 27 (1978), Soyuz 26 (1978) and Soyuz T-3 (1980)

=== United States ===
- Alan Shepard, first American in space — Mercury-Redstone 3 (1961); also flew and orbited to as well as walked on the Moon aboard Apollo 14 (1971)
- Robert Michael White* — X-15 Flight 62 (1962)
- Joseph A. Walker, first person to go to space twice; only USAF X-15 astronaut to fly above the Kármán line — X-15 Flight 77 (1963, reached 80-100km), X-15 Flight 90 (1963, reached 106km) and X-15 Flight 91 (1963, reached 108km)
- Robert A. Rushworth* — X-15 Flight 87 (1963)
- Michael J. Adams* — X-15 Flight 3-65-97 (1967)
- Gus Grissom — Mercury-Redstone 4 (1961); also orbited aboard Gemini 3 (1965)
- Joe Engle* — X-15 Flights 138 (1965), 143 (1965), and 153 (1965); also orbited
- John B. McKay* — X-15 Flight 150 (1965)
- William H. Dana* — X-15 Flights 174 (1966) and 197 (1968)
- William J. Knight* — X-15 Flight 190 (1967)
- Mike Melvill — SpaceShipOne flight 15P (2004), SpaceShipOne flight 16P (2004).
- Brian Binnie — SpaceShipOne flight 17P (2004)
- Mark P. Stucky* — VSS Unity VP-03 (2018)
- Frederick W. Sturckow* — VSS Unity VP-03 (2018), VSS Unity 21 (2021), VSS Unity 25 (2023) Galactic 02 (2023), Galactic 04 (2023), Galactic 06 (2024); also orbited
- Michael Masucci* — VSS Unity VF-01 (2019), Virgin Galactic Unity 22 (2021), Virgin Galactic Unity 25 (2023), Galactic 01 (2023), Galactic 03 (2023), Galactic 05 (2023)
- Beth Moses* — VSS Unity VF-01 (2019), Virgin Galactic Unity 22 (2021), VSS Unity 25 (2023) Galactic 02 (2023), Galactic 03 (2023), Galactic 04 (2023)
- Sirisha Bandla* — Virgin Galactic Unity 22 (2021)
- Jeff Bezos — Blue Origin NS-16 (2021)
- Mark Bezos — Blue Origin NS-16 (2021)
- Wally Funk — Blue Origin NS-16 (2021)
- Audrey Powers — Blue Origin NS-18 (2021)
- Glen de Vries — Blue Origin NS-18 (2021)
- Laura Shepard Churchley — Blue Origin NS-19 (2021)
- Michael Strahan — Blue Origin NS-19 (2021)
- Dylan Taylor — Blue Origin NS-19 (2021)
- Evan Dick — Blue Origin NS-19 (2021), Blue Origin NS-21 (2022)
- Lane Bess — Blue Origin NS-19 (2021), Blue Origin NS-30 (2025)
- Cameron Bess — Blue Origin NS-19 (2021)
- Marty Allen — Blue Origin NS-20 (2022)
- Sharon Hagle — Blue Origin NS-20 (2022), — Blue Origin NS-28 (2024)
- Marc Hagle — Blue Origin NS-20 (2022), Blue Origin NS-28 (2024)
- Jim Kitchen — Blue Origin NS-20 (2022)
- George Nield — Blue Origin NS-20 (2022)
- Gary Lai — Blue Origin NS-20 (2022)
- Victor Vescovo — Blue Origin NS-21 (2022)
- Jaison Robinson — Blue Origin NS-21 (2022)
- Katya Echazarreta — Blue Origin NS-21 (2022)
- Coby Cotton — Blue Origin NS-22 (2022)
- Clint Kelly III — Blue Origin NS-22 (2022), Blue Origin NS-36 (2025)
- Steve Young — Blue Origin NS-22 (2022)
- Christopher Huie* — Virgin Galactic Unity 25 (2023)
- Jamila Gilbert* — Virgin Galactic Unity 25 (2023)
- Luke Mays* — Virgin Galactic Unity 25 (2023)
- Kelly Latimer* — Galactic 02 (2023), Galactic 04 (2023)
- Ken Baxter* — Galactic 03 (2023)
- Ron Rosano* — Galactic 04 (2023)
- Alan Stern* — Galactic 05 (2023)
- Kellie Gerardi* — Galactic 05 (2023)
- Lina Borozdina* (flew under US and Ukrainian flags) — Galactic 06 (2024)
- Robie Vaughn* — Galactic 06 (2024)
- Neil Kornswiet* — Galactic 06 (2024)
- Carol Schaller — Blue Origin NS-25 (2024)
- Mason Angel — Blue Origin NS-25 (2024)
- Ed Dwight — Blue Origin NS-25, oldest person in space (2024)
- Kenneth Hess — Blue Origin NS-25 (2024)
- Andy Sadhwani* — Galactic 07 (2024)
- Irving Pergament* — Galactic 07 (2024)
- Rob Ferl — Blue Origin NS-26 (2024)
- Eiman Jahangir — Blue Origin NS-26 (2024)
- Karsen Kitchen — Blue Origin NS-26 (2024)
- Emily Calandrelli — Blue Origin NS-28 (2024)
- Henry (Hank) Wolfond — Blue Origin NS-28 (2024)
- Austin Litteral — Blue Origin NS-28 (2024)
- James (J.D.) Russell — Blue Origin NS-28 (2024), Blue Origin NS-34 (2025)
- Dr. Richard Scott — Blue Origin NS-34 (2025)
- Tushar Shah — Blue Origin NS-30 (2025)
- Robert Wilson — Blue Origin NS-30 (2025)
- Aisha Bowe — Blue Origin NS-31 (2025)
- Amanda Nguyen — Blue Origin NS-31 (2025)
- Gayle King — Blue Origin NS-31 (2025)
- Kerianne Flynn — Blue Origin NS-31 (2025)
- Katy Perry — Blue Origin NS-31 (2025)
- Lauren Sánchez — Blue Origin NS-31 (2025)
- Dr. Gretchen Green — Blue Origin NS-32 (2025)
- Paul Jeris — Blue Origin NS-32 (2025)
- Freddie Rescigno, Jr. — Blue Origin NS-33 (2025)
- Leland Larson — Blue Origin NS-33 (2025)
- Allie Kuehner — Blue Origin NS-33 (2025)
- Carl Kuehner — Blue Origin NS-33 (2025)
- James (Jim) Sitkin — Blue Origin NS-33 (2025)
- Arvinder (Arvi) Singh Bahal — Blue Origin NS-34 (2025)
- Aaron Newman — Blue Origin NS-36 (2025)
- Jeff Elgin — Blue Origin NS-36 (2025)
- William H. Lewis — Blue Origin NS-36 (2025)

=== United Kingdom ===
- David Mackay* — VSS Unity VF-01 (2019), VSS Unity 21 (2021), Virgin Galactic Unity 22 (2021)
- Richard Branson* — Virgin Galactic Unity 22 (2021)
- Hamish Harding — Blue Origin NS-21 (2022)
- Vanessa O'Brien — Blue Origin NS-22 (2022)
- Colin Bennett* — Virgin Galactic Unity 22 (2021), Galactic 01 (2023), Galactic 05 (2023)
- Jon Goodwin* — Galactic 02 (2023)
- Adrian Reynard* — Galactic 03 (2023)
- Trevor Beattie* — Galactic 04 (2023)
- Lionel Pitchford — Blue Origin NS-34 (2025)

=== Dual citizens ===
Additionally, Hamish Harding was a dual national British and UAE and Vanessa O'Brien is a dual national American and British. Both chose to fly the British flag on their respective Blue Origin flights. But, Timothy Nash who is a dual national South African and British flew under both flags. Some others like him also flew under two flags.

== See also ==
- List of American astronauts by birthplace
- List of spaceflight-related accidents and incidents
- List of space travellers by first flight
- Timeline of space travel by nationality

== Notes ==
*Due to the rise of space tourism (predominately done through private companies, such as but not limited to: Space X and Virgin) this list may change or may become outdated .
