= Salyut 5 =

Soviet space station (1976–1977)

Salyut 5 (OPS-3)

Station statistics
- COSPAR ID: 1976-057A
- SATCAT no.: 08911
- Call sign: Salyut 5
- Crew: 2
- Launch: 22 June 1976; 18:04:00 UTC
- Carrier rocket: Proton-K
- Launch pad: Baikonur 81/23
- Reentry: 8 August 1977
- Mass: 19,000 kg
- Length: 14.55 metres (47.7 ft)
- Diameter: 4.15 metres (13.6 ft)
- Pressurised volume: 100 cubic metres (3,500 cu ft)
- Periapsis altitude: 223 kilometres (120 nmi)
- Apoapsis altitude: 269 kilometres (145 nmi)
- Orbital inclination: 51.6°
- Orbital period: 89 minutes
- Days in orbit: 412 days
- Days occupied: 67 days
- No. of orbits: 6,666
- Distance travelled: Approx 270,409,616 kilometres (168,024,745 mi)
- Configuration
- Salyut 5 diagram

Salyut 5 (Russian: Салют-5 meaning Salute 5), also known as OPS-3, was a Soviet space station. Launched in 1976 as part of the Salyut programme, it was the third and last Almaz space station to be launched for the Soviet military. Two Soyuz missions visited the station, each crewed by two cosmonauts. A third Soyuz mission attempted to visit the station but failed to dock. A fourth mission was planned but never launched.

== Launch ==
Salyut 5 was launched at 18:04:00 UTC on 22 June 1976. The launch took place from Site 81/23 the Baikonur Cosmodrome in the Kazakh Soviet Socialist Republic, and used a three-stage Proton-K carrier rocket with the serial number 290–02.

Upon reaching orbit, Salyut 5 was assigned the International Designator 1976-057A. The North American Aerospace Defense Command gave it the Satellite Catalog Number 08911.

== Spacecraft ==
Salyut 5 was an Almaz spacecraft, the last of three to be launched as space stations after Salyut 2 and Salyut 3. Like its predecessors, it was 14.55 metres (47.7 ft) long, with a maximum diameter of 4.15 metres (13.6 ft). It had a habitable interior volume of 100 cubic metres (3,500 cu ft), and a mass at launch of 19,000 kilograms (42,000 lb). The station was equipped with a single docking port for Soyuz spacecraft, with the Soyuz 7K-T being the configuration in service at the time. Two solar arrays mounted laterally at the same end of the station as the docking port provided it with power. The station was equipped with a KSI capsule to return research data and materials.

Salyut 5 carried Agat, a camera which the crews used to observe the Earth. The German Kristall furnace was used for crystal growth experiments aboard the station.

== Operation ==
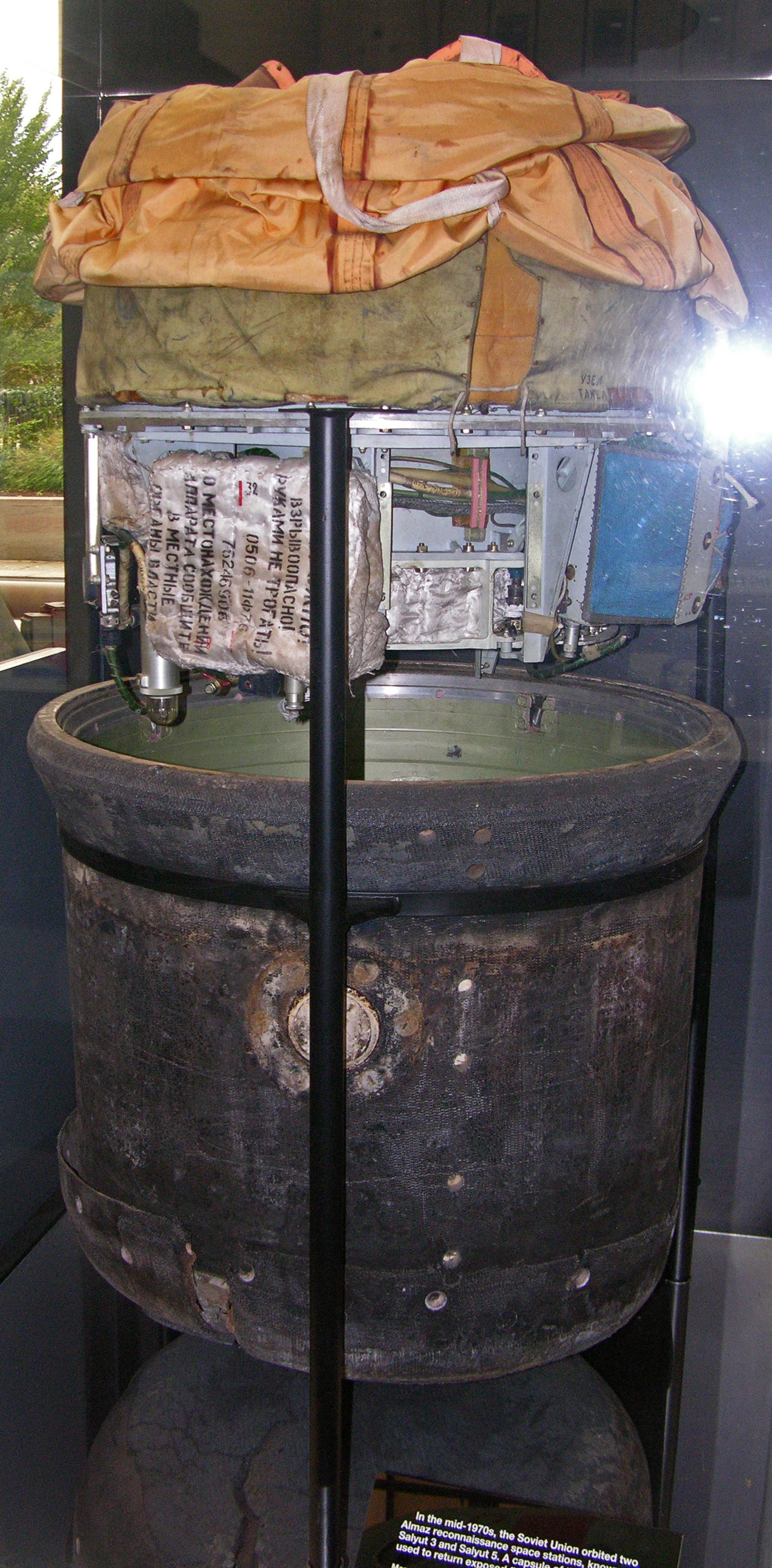
Information descent capsule

Four crewed missions to Salyut 5 were originally planned. The first, Soyuz 21, was launched from Baikonur on 6 July 1976, and docked at 13:40 UTC the next day. The primary objective of the Soyuz 21 mission aboard Salyut 5 was to conduct military experiments. Scientific research included studying effects of microgravity and solar observation. The crew also conducted a televised conference with school pupils. Cosmonauts Boris Volynov and Vitali Zholobov remained aboard Salyut 5 until 24 August, when they returned to Earth landing 200 km southwest of Kokchetav. The mission had been expected to last longer, but the atmosphere within Salyut 5 became contaminated with nitric acid fumes from a fuel leak, affecting the crew's psychological and physical condition and necessitating an emergency landing.

On 14 October 1976, Soyuz 23 was launched carrying Vyacheslav Zudov and Valery Rozhdestvensky to the space station. During approach for docking the next day, a faulty sensor incorrectly detected lateral motion. The spacecraft's Igla automated docking system fired the spacecraft's maneuvering thrusters in an attempt to stop the phantom motion. Although the crew was able to deactivate the Igla system, the spacecraft had expended too much fuel to re-attempt the docking under manual control. Soyuz 23 returned to Earth on 16 October without completing its mission objectives.

The last mission to Salyut 5, Soyuz 24, was launched on 7 February 1977. Its crew consisted of cosmonauts Viktor Gorbatko and Yury Glazkov, who conducted repairs aboard the station and vented the air which had been reported to be contaminated. Scientific experiments were conducted, including observation of the sun. The Soyuz 24 crew departed on 25 February. Salyut 5 ran low on propellant for its main engines and attitude control system, which necessitated shortening the mission.

The fourth planned mission (designated Soyuz 25 if launched) was intended to visit the station for two weeks in July 1977. It would have been crewed by cosmonauts Anatoly Berezovoy and Mikhail Lisun; the backup crew for the Soyuz 24 mission. The mission was cancelled due to a shortage of propellant. The spacecraft which was constructed for the Soyuz 25 mission was reused for the Soyuz 30 mission to Salyut 6. Since it could not be refuelled, and no longer had the fuel to sustain crewed operations, the KSI recoverable capsule was ejected and returned to Earth on 26 February. Salyut 5 was deorbited on 8 August 1977 and burned up as it reentered the Earth's atmosphere.

== See also ==
- Space station for statistics of occupied space stations
- Salyut
- TKS spacecraft
- Almaz
- Mir
- Skylab
- International Space Station
