= Soyuz 21 =

1976 crewed spaceflight to Salyut 5

- Operator: Soviet space program
- COSPAR ID: 1976-064A
- SATCAT no.: 8934
- Mission duration: 49 days, 6 hours and 23 minutes
- Orbits completed: 791

Spacecraft properties
- Spacecraft: Soyuz 7K-T No.9
- Spacecraft type: Soyuz 7K-T/A9
- Manufacturer: NPO Energia
- Launch mass: 6,750 kg (14,880 lb)
- Landing mass: 1,200 kg (2,600 lb)

Crew
- Crew size: 2
- Members: Boris Volynov; Vitaly Zholobov
- Callsign: Байкал (Baikal - "Lake Baikal")

Start of mission
- Launch date: 6 July 1976, 12:08:45 UTC
- Rocket: Soyuz 11A511
- Launch site: Baikonur 1/5

End of mission
- Landing date: 24 August 1976, 18:32:17 UTC
- Landing site: 200 km at the southwest of Kokshetau, Kazakhstan

Orbital parameters
- Reference system: Geocentric orbit
- Regime: Low Earth orbit
- Perigee altitude: 193 km (120 mi)
- Apogee altitude: 253 km (157 mi)
- Inclination: 51.6°
- Period: 88.7 minutes

Docking with Salyut 5
- Docking date: 7 July 1976, 13:40:00 UTC
- Undocking date: 24 August 1976, 13:40:13 UTC
- Time docked: 48 days
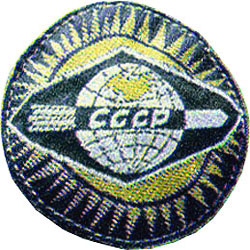
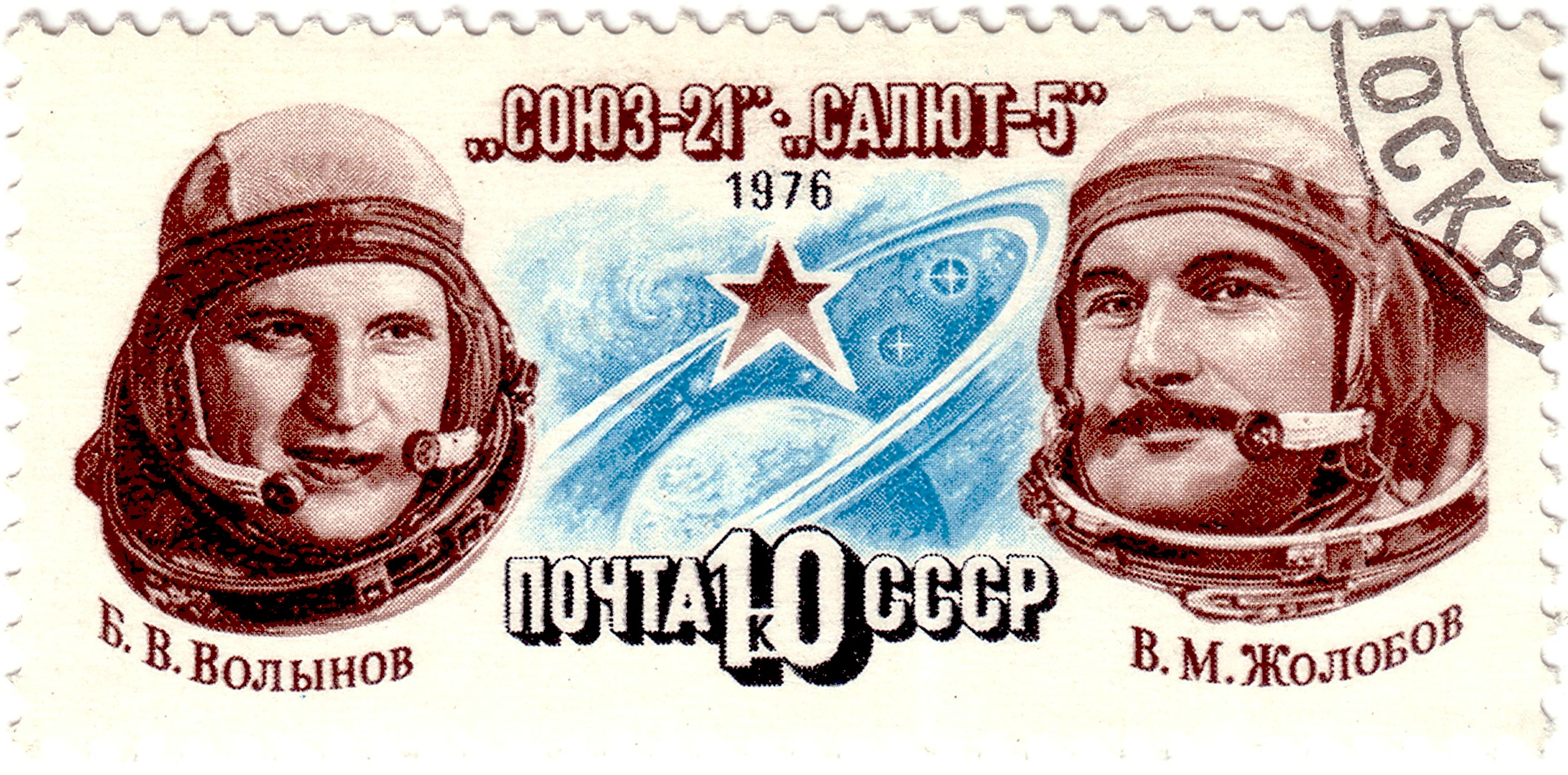
- Vimpel Diamond patch Soviet stamp featuring Volynov and Zholobov (1976) Soyuz programme

Soyuz 21 (Russian: Союз 21, Union 21) was a 1976 Soviet crewed mission to the Salyut 5 space station, the first of three flights to the station. The mission's objectives were mainly military in scope, but included other scientific work. The mission ended abruptly with cosmonauts Boris Volynov and Vitaly Zholobov returning to Earth after 49 days in orbit. The precise reason for the early end of the mission was the subject of much speculation, but was reported to be an emergency evacuation after the Salyut atmosphere developed an acrid odor, possibly from "the station's atmosphere becoming toxic as a result of the chemicals being used to expose surveillance photographs. By some accounts, Zholobov, in particular, fell ill."

== Crew ==
| Position | Cosmonaut |
|---|---|
| Commander | Boris Volynov; Second and final spaceflight |
| Flight engineer | Vitaly Zholobov; Only spaceflight |

=== Backup crew ===
| Position | Cosmonaut |
|---|---|
| Commander | Vyacheslav Zudov |
| Flight engineer | Valery Rozhdestvensky |

=== Reserve crew ===
| Position | Cosmonaut |
|---|---|
| Commander | Viktor Gorbatko |
| Flight engineer | Yury Glazkov |

== Mission parameters ==
- Mass: 6,750 kg (14,880 lb)
- Perigee: 193.0 km (119.9 mi)
- Apogee: 253.0 km (157.2 mi)
- Inclination: 51.6°
- Period: 88.7 minutes

== Mission highlights ==
Salyut 5, the last dedicated military space station in the Soviet space program, was launched 22 June 1976. Its first crew was launched 14 days later on 6 July 1976, with Commander Volynov and Flight engineer Zholobov aboard Soyuz 21. Based on landing opportunities, observers estimated the mission was intended to last 54 to 66 days. They docked with the station the next day, and gave a televised tour 8 July 1976.

Their stay coincided with the start of the Siber military exercise in Siberia, which they observed as part of an assessment of the station's military surveillance capabilities. They conducted only a few scientific experiments, including the first use of the Kristall furnace for crystal growth. Engineering experiments included propellant transfer system tests with implications for future operation of the freight-carrying Progress spacecraft.

Experiments conducted during the mission were mainly of a military nature as part of the Almaz program. Various purely scientific tasks were also carried out, including solar observations and biological observations of an aquarium of fish carried into orbit. A television link-up with school children on 17 August 1976 was also undertaken.

On 24 August 1976, it was announced the mission was to end in only 10 hours, a development which caught even the reporters of Radio Moscow by surprise. The reason for the sudden termination of the mission was reported at the time to have been an acrid odor that developed in the environmental control system. The problem was said to have begun as early as 17 August 1976. The Soviets made no comments at the time, but the next crew to board the station wore breathing masks. Later reports indicate that the mission may have ended owing to a deterioration in the health of Zholobov. The mission was to last two months but was cut short by a gradually worsening illness of Zholobov.

The cosmonauts boarded Soyuz 21 but as Volynov tried to undock from the station, the docking latches failed to release properly. As he fired the jets to move the spacecraft away, the docking mechanism jammed, resulting in the Soyuz being undocked but still linked to Salyut. As the two spacecraft moved out of range of ground communications, the cosmonauts received only the first set of emergency procedures. Volynov tried a second time to undock but only managed slightly to loosen the latches. The situation persisted for an entire orbit, 90 minutes, when the final set of emergency procedures were received and the crew finally disengaged the latches.

Because Soyuz 21 was returning early, it was outside the normal recovery window. It then encountered strong winds as it descended, which caused uneven firing of the retrorockets. It made a hard landing around midnight 200 km (120 mi) at the southwest of Kokchetav, Kazakhstan.

Zholobov's illness was apparently caused by nitric acid fumes leaking from the Salyut's propellant tanks; other reports, however, indicate that the crew failed to follow their physical exercise program and suffered from lack of sleep. Sources at NASA have reported that psychologists with the Russian Aviation and Space Agency cited Soyuz 21 as ending prematurely due to unspecified "interpersonal issues" with the crew. The next mission to successfully dock with the station, Soyuz 24, would vent Salyut 5's air to space and replace it due to concerns the air had become toxic.
