= Soyuz 24 =

Crewed flight of the Soyuz programme

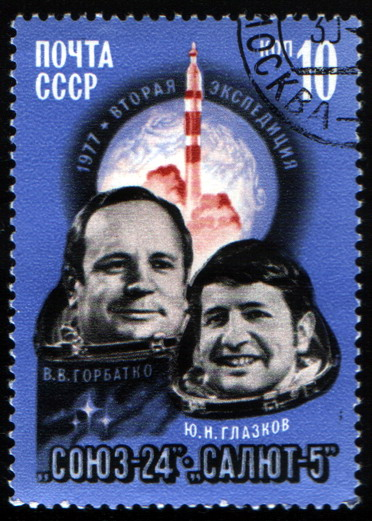
- Commemorative stamp of 1977 of Viktor Gorbatko and Yuri Glazkov
- Operator: Soviet space program
- COSPAR ID: 1977-008A
- SATCAT no.: 09804
- Mission duration: 17 days 17 hours 26 minutes
- Orbits completed: 285

Spacecraft properties
- Spacecraft: Soyuz 7K-T No.11
- Spacecraft type: Soyuz 7K-T/A9
- Manufacturer: NPO Energia
- Launch mass: 6750 kg
- Landing mass: 1200 kg

Crew
- Crew size: 2
- Members: Viktor Gorbatko; Yuri Glazkov
- Callsign: Терек (Terek); Terek River

Start of mission
- Launch date: 7 February 1977, 16:11 UTC
- Rocket: Soyuz-U
- Launch site: Baikonur, Site 1/5

End of mission
- Landing date: 25 February 1977, 09:38 UTC
- Landing site: 37 km at the northeast of Arkalyk, Kazakhstan

Orbital parameters
- Reference system: Geocentric orbit
- Regime: Low Earth orbit
- Perigee altitude: 184.7 km
- Apogee altitude: 346.2 km
- Inclination: 51.65°
- Period: 89.52 minutes

Docking with Salyut 5
- Docking date: 8 February 1977
- Undocking date: 25 February 1977
- Time docked: 17 days
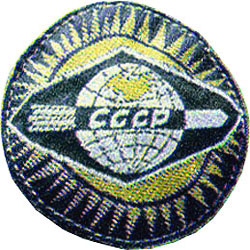
- Vimpel Diamond patch Soyuz programme

Soyuz 24 (Russian: Союз 24, Union 24) was a February, 1977, Soviet mission to the Salyut 5 space station, the third and final mission to the station, the last purely military crew for the Soviets and the final mission to a military Salyut. The cosmonauts Viktor Gorbatko and Yuri Glazkov re-activated the station after toxic fumes had apparently terminated the mission of Soyuz 21, the previous crew.

They performed biological and materials experiments while on board. Other presumed activities included photographic reconnaissance, and finishing tasks the previous crew was forced to abandon when their mission abruptly ended. The Soyuz 24 crew landed after spending 18 days in space, and the Salyut station was de-orbited six months later.

== Crew ==
Position	Cosmonaut
Commander	Viktor Gorbatko; Second spaceflight
Flight engineer	Yuri Glazkov; Only spaceflight

=== Backup crew ===
Position	Cosmonaut
Commander	Anatoly Berezovoy
Flight engineer	Mikhail Lisun

=== Reserve crew ===
Position	Cosmonaut
Commander	Vladimir Kozelsky
Flight engineer	Vladimir Preobrazhensky

== Mission highlights ==
The cosmonauts Gorbatko and Glazkov were the back-up crew for Soyuz 23, which failed to dock with Salyut 5 several months earlier. Soyuz 24 was launched 7 February 1977, and successfully docked with the orbiting space station the next day. However, the crew did not immediately enter the station, atypically having a sleep period first and delaying their entry by some 11 hours. Observers speculate that problems with fumes which may have caused the Soyuz 21 crew to leave were resolved or dealt with by the new crew. They entered the station wearing breathing apparatus and made numerous tests of the atmosphere before apparently concluding conditions were safe and removing their breathing devices.

Observers speculate that the flight had a specific objective and was not meant to be a long-duration mission. In any case, fuel for the station to maneuver was too depleted to attempt a long mission. The crew continued the research started by the Soyuz 21 crew, performed Earth resources work, biological and materials experiments. But, being a part of the Almaz military Salyut program, other unrevealed projects were likely carried out. The flight would prove to be not only the final flight to a military Salyut station, but also the final all-military crew to be launched by the Soviets. On 21 February 1977, the crew performed an air-changing experiment, shown on TV, slowly venting air from one end of the station to the other while releasing 100 kg of air from tanks in the docked Soyuz orbital module. This was a test of the future air replenishment techniques to be carried out with Progress transports in subsequent space stations.

They began to activate the Soyuz 24 on 23 February 1977, then deactivate the space station, and undocked and landed near Arkalyk on 25 February 1977. The Soyuz landed in a blowing snowstorm and recovery crews could not locate the space capsule. As it turned out, the search and rescue beacon was unable to deploy due to being jammed shut from snow, so Gorbatko had to free it by hand.

On 26 February 1977, Salyut 5 ejected a research module. The research module, which was recovered on Soviet territory, containing exposed film and experiments carried out by the two crews who crewed the space station. The Salyut 5 space station was deorbited on 8 August 1977.

== Mission parameters ==
- Mass: 6,750 kg (14,880 lb)
- Perigee: 218.0 km (135.5 mi)
- Apogee: 281.0 km (174.6 mi)
- Inclination: 51.60°
- Period: 89.20 minutes
