= Boris Volynov =

Russian former cosmonaut (born 1934)

- Борис Волынов
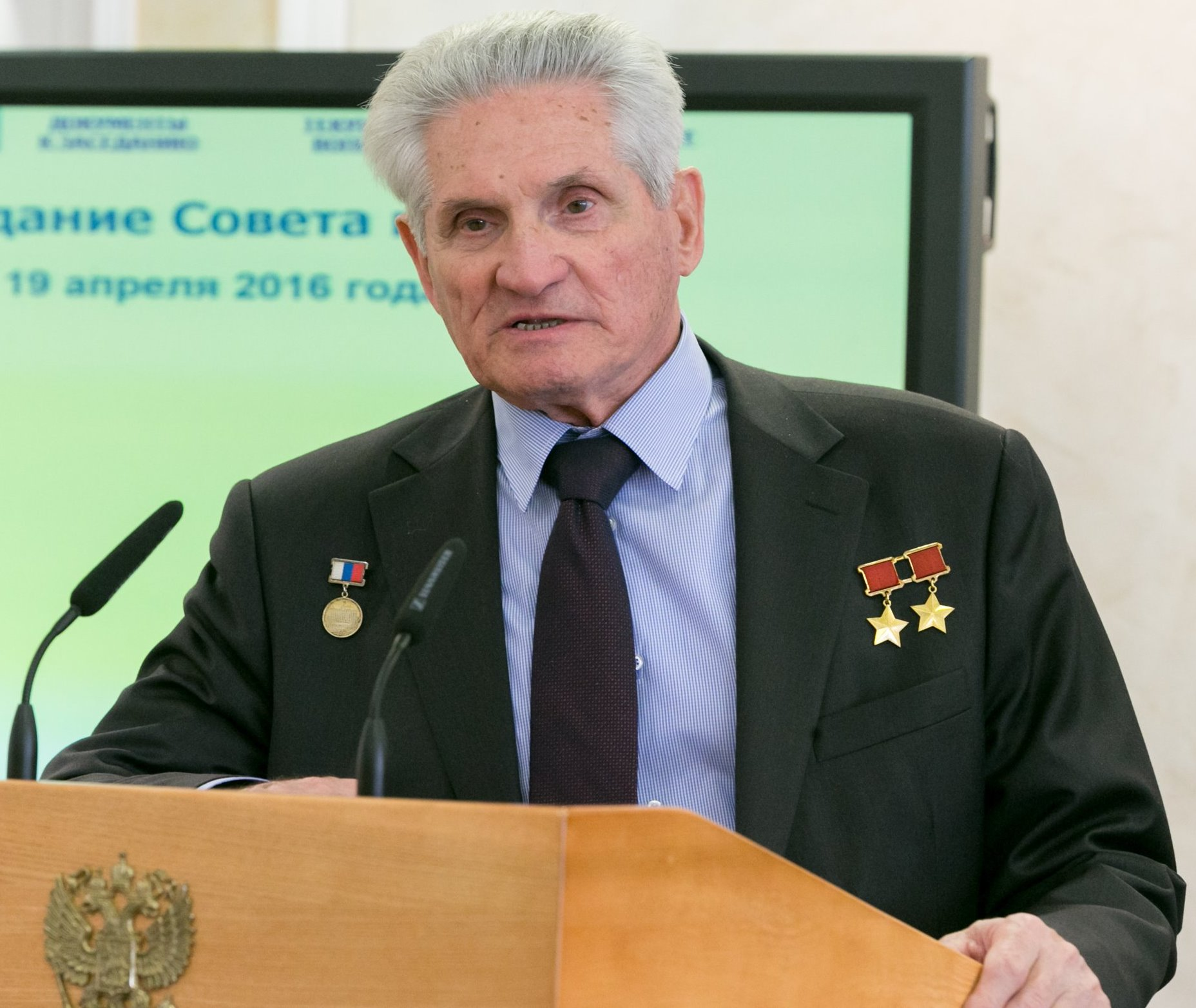
- Volynov in 2016
- Born: Boris Valentinovich Volynov; 18 December 1934 (age 91); Irkutsk, Russian SFSR, Soviet Union
- Occupation: Electrical Engineer
- Space career

Cosmonaut
- Status: Retired
- Rank: Colonel, Soviet Air Force
- Time in space: 52d 07h 17m
- Selection: Air Force Group 1
- Mission: Soyuz 5, Soyuz 21

Boris Valentinovich Volynov (Russian: Борис Валентинович Волынов; born 18 December 1934) is a Russian former cosmonaut who flew two space missions of the Soviet Union's Soyuz programme: Soyuz 5, and Soyuz 21. Following the death of Alexei Leonov in October 2019, he is the last surviving member of the original group of cosmonauts. He is also considered to be the first Jew in space.

== Biography ==
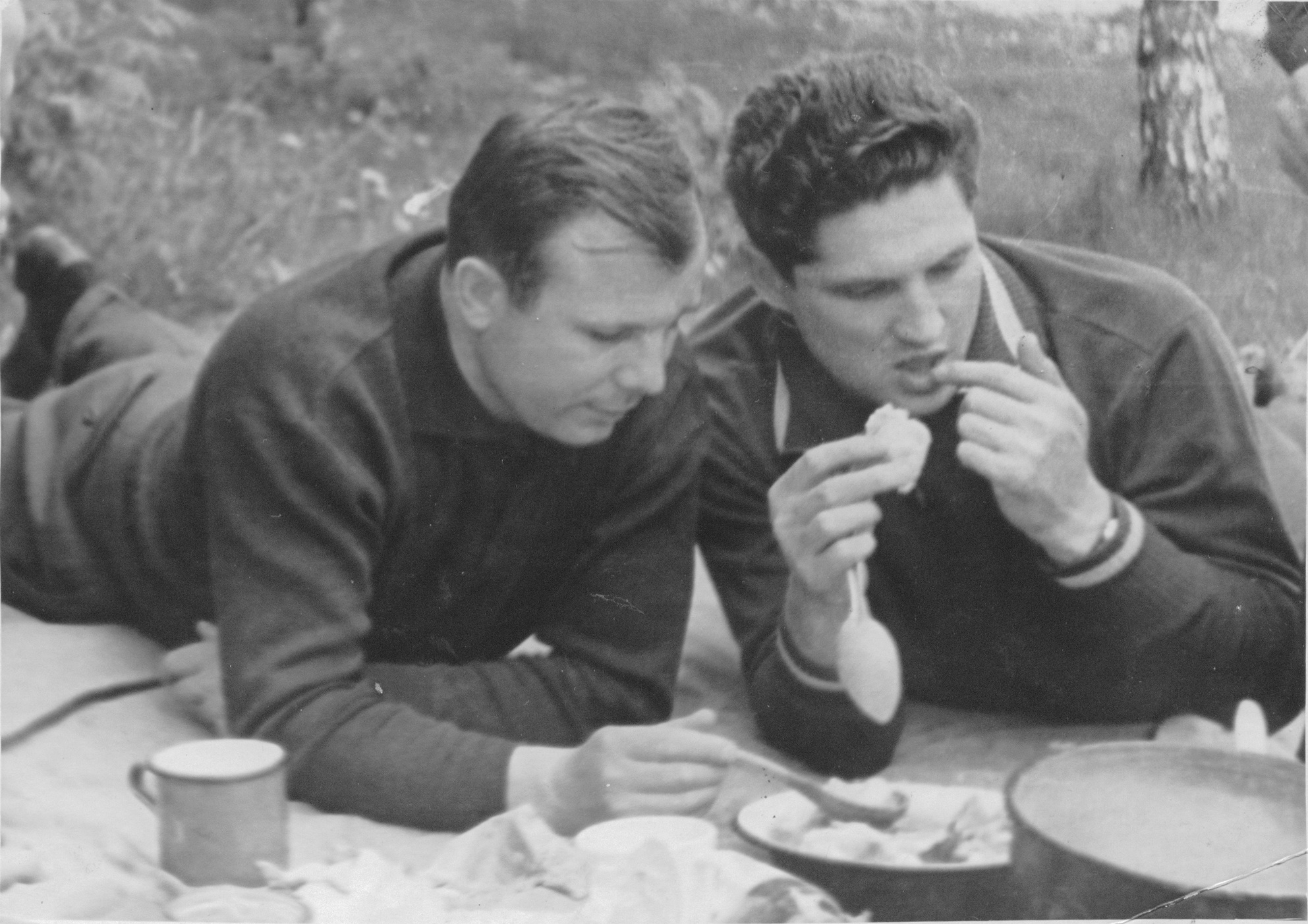
Yuri Gagarin (left) and Boris Volynov (right) on picnic in Dolgoprudny

Volynov was born in Irkutsk in Siberia, but then his family relocated, and he finished secondary school in Prokopyevsk, Kemerovo Oblast, in 1952. The next year he completed basic pilot training in Pavlodar, Kazakhstan, and in 1955 graduated from an aviation school in Novosibirsk. From September 1961 to January 1968 he studied at the faculty of engineering of the Zhukovsky Air Force Engineering Academy and graduated with a diploma of a pilot-engineer-cosmonaut. Later in 1980 he defended a PhD at the same academy. After resigning from the space program in 1982, he spent eight years as a senior administrator at the Gagarin Cosmonaut Training Centre. After 30 years of service in Star City, in 1990, he retired in the rank of colonel due to age limit.

== Career ==
=== Voskhod 1 ===
Volynov was assigned as one of two possible commanders training for Voskhod 1 in 1964, but he and his fellow crewmembers Georgi Katys and Boris Yegorov were bumped three days before the scheduled launch date despite being the prime crew. Sergey Korolyov was reportedly furious about this decision, but was told by Nikita Khrushchev "Don't rock the boat – it's not worth it!"

=== Voskhod 3 ===
Having lost his chance to fly on the first Voskhod mission, Volynov spent a year training for Voskhod 3. He first trained with Georgi Katys, but Katys was dropped from active status when the KGB discovered his father had been executed in one of Stalin's purges. He was then teamed up with Viktor Gorbatko and then Georgi Shonin, but following the death of Sergey Korolyov on 14 January 1966, the Voskhod 3 flight was cancelled just 10 days before launch. Korolyov's successor, Vasily Mishin, cancelled the mission as he was intent on concentrating on Soyuz instead. Volynov was subsequently transferred to the Soyuz group and later assigned as a backup for Soyuz 3.

=== Soyuz 5 ===
Soyuz 5 was launched on January 15, 1969, crewed by Volynov, Aleksei Yeliseyev, and Yevgeny Khrunov. On 16 January Yeliseyev and Khrunov transferred to Soyuz 4, crewed by Commander Vladimir Shatalov, following an orbital rendezvous and docking. Soyuz 4 undocked from Soyuz 5 the following day and Volynov prepared for a solo re-entry.

Soyuz 5's equipment module failed to separate properly following retrofire due to the misfiring of explosive bolts, and consequently blocked the re-entry heat shield on the base of the descent module. As a result of the added mass of the equipment module, Volynov lost control of Soyuz 5 which began to tumble, finally stabilizing itself with the thinnest part of the spacecraft facing forward. As the assembly entered the atmosphere, the stress and heat on the supporting struts between the modules finally made them burn through and part, allowing the equipment module to fall away and burn up on re-entry. Volynov could only wait while the descent module's automatic orientation system tried to regain control, which fortunately it managed to do with the heat shield facing forward.

Following re-entry, the module's parachutes deployed only partially, and a failure of the soft-landing retrorockets in the base of the descent module caused a hard landing which almost wrecked the module, and broke some of Volynov's teeth.

=== Soyuz 21 ===
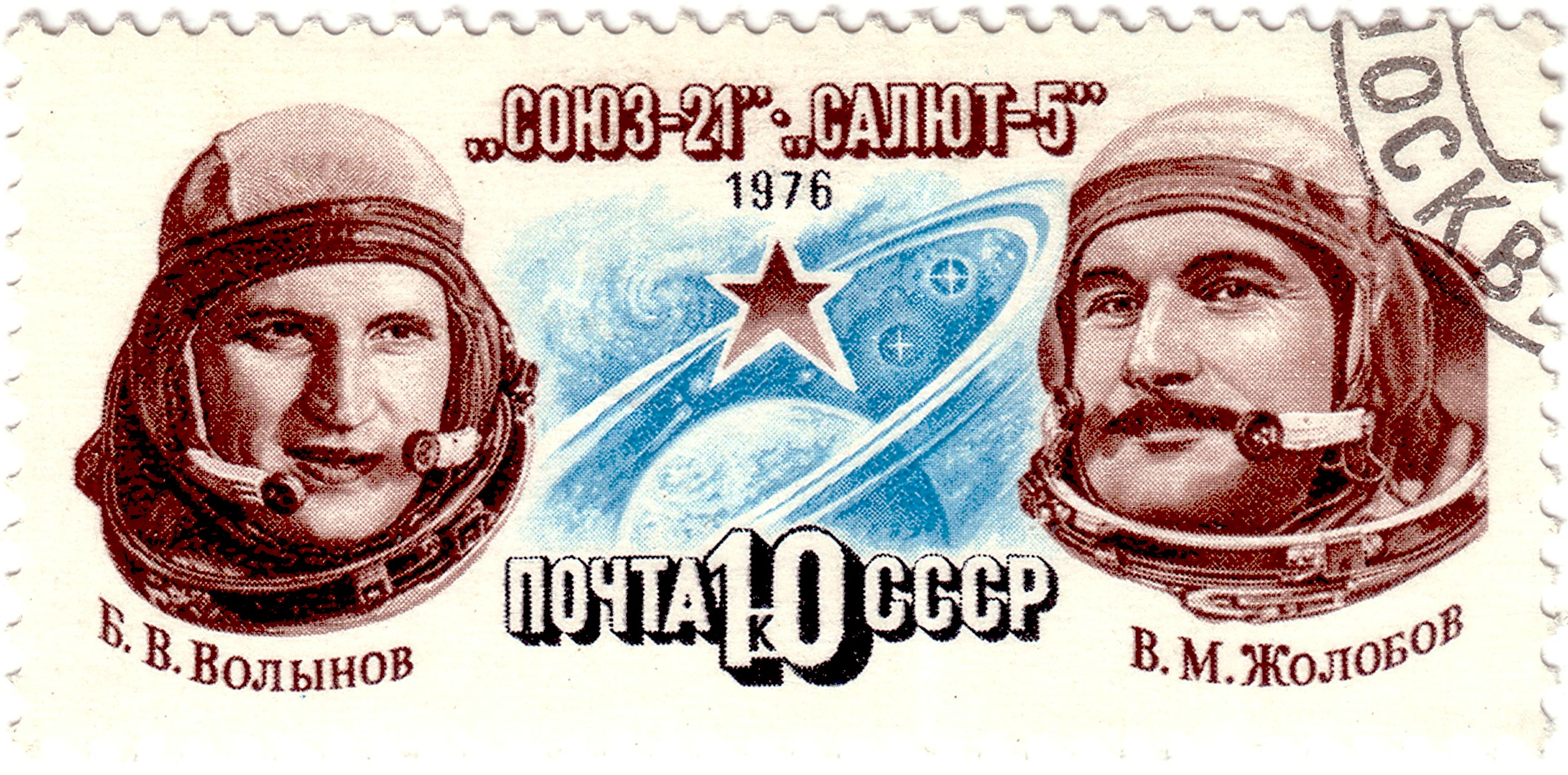
Boris Volynov (left) and Vitaly Zholobov (right) on a 1976 U.S.S.R. postage stamp.

On July 6, 1976, Volynov and Flight Engineer Vitaliy Zholobov were launched on board Soyuz 21 to spend between 54 and 66 days aboard the space station Salyut 5. Following a deterioration in the health of Zholobov, who was making his first spaceflight, the decision was made to return the crew at the earliest available opportunity and they boarded their Soyuz on August 24. However, as Volynov tried to undock from Salyut, the latch failed to release properly. As he fired the jets to move the spacecraft away, the docking mechanism jammed, resulting in the Soyuz being undocked but still linked to Salyut. As the two spacecraft moved out of range of ground communications, only the first set of emergency procedures was received. Volynov tried a second time to undock but managed only to slightly loosen the latches. This situation persisted for an entire orbit (90 minutes), then the final set of emergency procedures were received and the latches finally disengaged.

Because Soyuz 21 was returning early, it was outside the normal recovery window, and encountered strong winds as it descended, which caused uneven firing of the retrorockets. It made a hard landing around midnight 200 km southwest of Kokchetav, Kazakhstan. Zholobov's illness was apparently caused by nitric acid fumes leaking from the Salyut's propellant tanks. However, other reports indicate that the crew failed to properly follow their physical exercise program and suffered from lack of sleep.

== Honours and awards ==
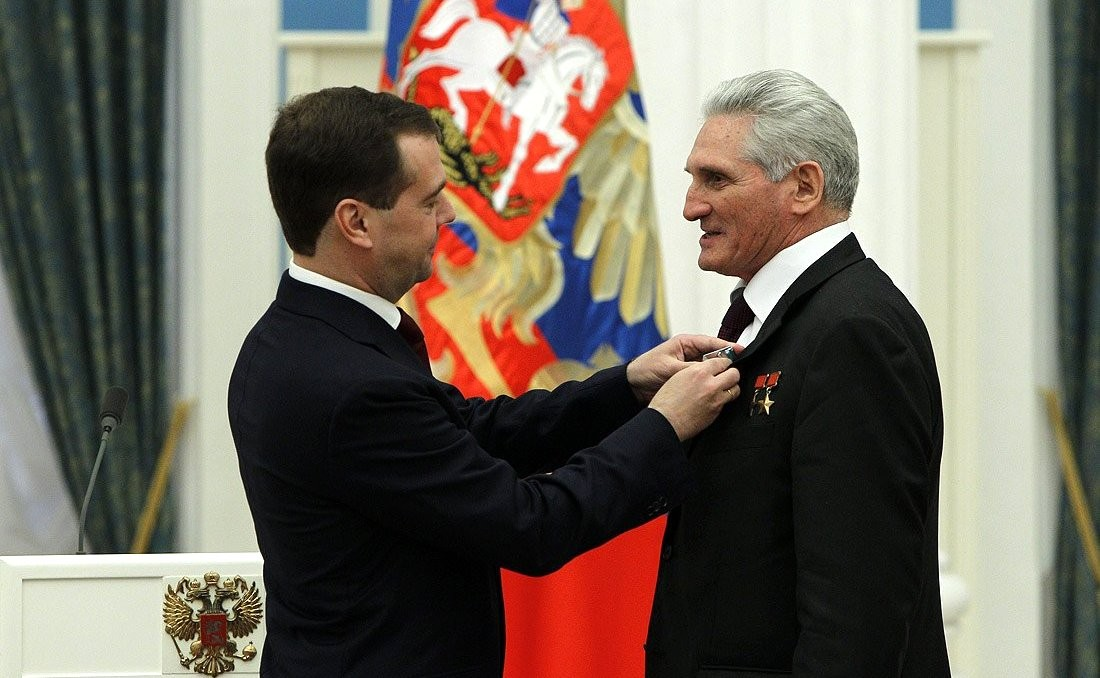
Russian president Dmitri Medvedev awards Volynov with the Order of Friendship on 12 April 2011 (Cosmonautics Day)

- Twice Hero of the Soviet Union (1969, 1976)
- Pilot-Cosmonaut of the USSR
- Order For Merit to the Fatherland 4th class
- Order of Friendship
- Two Orders of Lenin (1969, 1976)
- Order of the Red Star (1961)
- Order for Service to the Homeland in the Armed Forces of the USSR 3rd class
- Medal "For Distinction in Guarding the State Border of the USSR"
- Order of the Banner of the People's Republic of Bulgaria
- Medal "Brotherhood in Arms" (Polish People's Republic)
- Honorary Citizen of Prokopyevsk

== Family ==
His mother, Yevgenia Izrailevna Volynova (1910–1991) was a pediatrician, and received a title of Honored Doctor of Russia. During World War II, she worked as a surgeon. Her Jewish background hindered selection of Volynov for space missions. His wife, Tamara Fyodorovna Savinova (b. 1935) holds a PhD in metallurgy and is a member of the New York Academy of Sciences. They have two children: a son, Andrei (b. 1958) and daughter Tatyana (b. 1965).
