= Vitaly Zholobov =

Soviet cosmonaut (born 1937)

Vitaly Zholobov Виталий Жолобов Віталій Жолобов
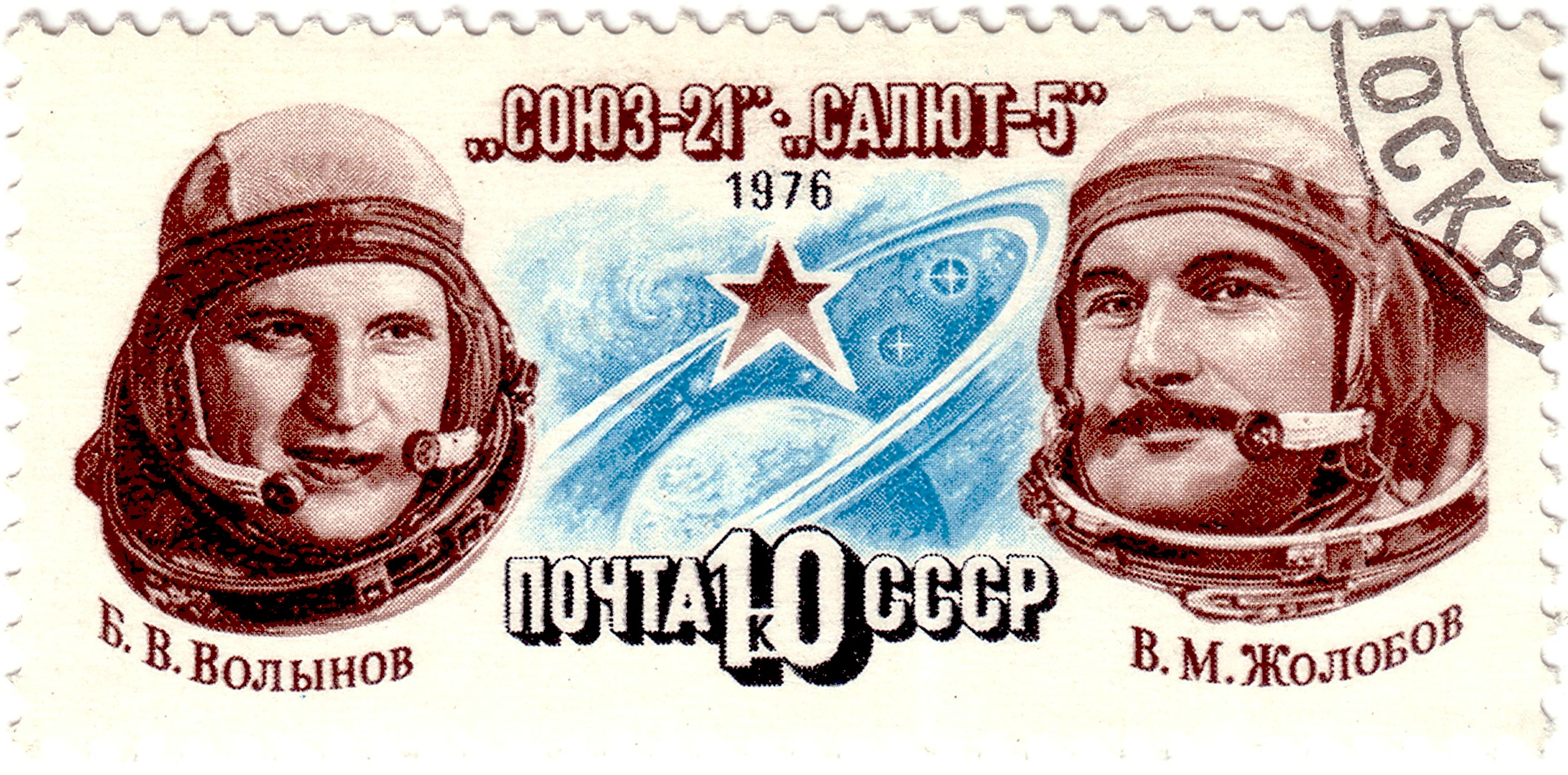
- Boris Volynov (left) and Vitaly Zholobov on a 1976 Soviet stamp

Governor of Kherson Oblast
- In office 11 July 1995 – 7 June 1996
- Succeeded by: Yurii Karasyk

Chairman of the Kherson Oblast Council
- In office 7 July 1994 – 27 June 1996
- Preceded by: Mykhailo Kushnerenko
- Succeeded by: Valerii Tretyakov
- Born: 18 June 1937 (age 89); Stara Zburyivka, Ukrainian SSR, Soviet Union
- Occupation: Engineer
- Space career

Cosmonaut
- Status: Retired
- Rank: Colonel, Soviet Air Force
- Time in space: 49d 06h 23m
- Selection: Air Force Group 2
- Missions: Soyuz 21

Vitaly Mikhaylovich Zholobov (Russian: Виталий Михайлович Жолобов; Ukrainian: Віталій Михайлович Жолобов; born 18 June 1937) is a retired Soviet cosmonaut who flew on Soyuz 21 space flight as the flight engineer, and a former head of Kherson Regional Council in Ukraine.

== Career ==
Zholobov joined the space programme from the Soviet Air Force where he held the rank of Colonel-engineer.

His only trip to space involved a two-month stay on the Salyut 5 space station (Soyuz 21 mission). The flight was scheduled to last for 60 days but lasted for only 49. The reason for the cancellation was the detection of a noxious odor on board. Zholobov reported to the Mission Control Center that the smell was similar to that of a propellant which was known to be toxic. The Control Center decided to abort the mission to avoid exposing the crew to further risk and because the research and technology programs were already successfully finished. He was in orbit from 6 June 1976 to 24 August 1976.

Although he never flew again, Zholobov stayed in the space programme until 1981 when he resigned to become director of a geological science research group.

== Political career ==
In 1994, he was elected in the Kherson region as the Chairman of the Kherson Regional Council — the head of the Kherson Regional Administration. He held this position until 1996. At this time, his deputy was killed by a hired killer.

From 12 June 1996 to 4 February 1997, he held the position of Deputy General Director of the National Space Agency of Ukraine.

Since 1999, he has been the chairman of the board of the Kyiv organization "Slava", since 2001 he has been the president of the All-Ukrainian association "Slava".

From 11 April 2002 to 2015, he was the president of the Aerospace Society of Ukraine.

== Awards ==
- Hero of the Soviet Union
- Pilot-Cosmonaut of the USSR
- Order of Merit 3rd class (Ukraine)
- Order of Lenin
- Medal "For Merit in Space Exploration" (Russian Federation)
- Medal "For the Development of Virgin Lands"
- Medal "For Distinction in Guarding the State Border of the USSR"
