= Yuri Glazkov =

Soviet Air Force general and cosmonaut (1939–2008)

- Юрий Глазков
- Born: October 2, 1939; Moscow, USSR
- Died: 9 December 2008 (aged 69); Moscow, Russia
- Occupation: Pilot
- Awards: Hero of the Soviet Union; Order of Lenin
- Space career

Cosmonaut
- Rank: Major General, Russian Air Force
- Time in space: 17d 17h 25m
- Selection: Air Force Group 3
- Missions: Soyuz 24

Yury Nikolayevich Glazkov (Russian: Ю́рий Никола́евич Глазко́в; 2 October 1939 – 9 December 2008) was a Soviet Air Force officer and a cosmonaut. Glazkov held the rank of major general in the Russian Air Force.

== Biography ==
Born in Moscow, in the USSR, Glazkov graduated from Kharkov Military Engineering High School in 1962, receiving the candidate of technical sciences degree.

He served as a flight engineer in the Soviet Air Force before being selected as a cosmonaut on 23 October 1965. He flew as a Flight Engineer on the Soyuz 24 mission. He retired from the cosmonaut corps on 26 January 1982. After Soyuz 24, he was made a Hero of the Soviet Union.

He was awarded a doctorate in technical sciences in 1974, and in 1989 he became the first Deputy Chief of Gagarin Cosmonaut Training Center, a position from which he retired in May 2000.

Glazkov wrote several books, including a technical guide to spacewalking, Outside Orbiting Spacecraft in 1977 and a book about space exploration, The World Around Us in 1986. Glazkov also authored several science-fiction novels. One of which, "Чёрное безмолвие" (The Black Silence) was illustrated by fellow cosmonaut Vladimir Dzhanibekov. It was published in 1987.

Glazkov was survived by his wife Lyubov, and two children.

== Honours and awards ==
- Hero of the Soviet Union (5 March 1977)
- Pilot-Cosmonaut of the USSR
- Order of Merit for the Fatherland;
  - 3rd class (2 March 2000) - a great service to the state in the development of manned space flight
  - 4th class (9 April 1996)
- Order of Lenin (5 March 1977)
- Order of the Red Star (21 February 1985)
- Medal "For Distinction in Guarding the State Border of the USSR" (1977)
- Medal "For development of virgin lands" (1977)
- Medal "For Strengthening Military Cooperation" (18 February 1991)
- Order Dostyk (Kazakhstan, 11 December 1998)
- Medal "100th anniversary of the fall of the Ottoman yoke" (Bulgaria) (22 October 1978)
- Medal "For Strengthening brotherhood in arms" (Bulgaria)
- Medal "30th anniversary of the Revolutionary Military Council of the Republic of Cuba" (24 November 1986)
- USSR State Prize (28 October 1987)
- State Prize of the Russian Federation (1999)
- Tsiolkovsky Gold Medal (Academy of Sciences of the USSR)
- Honorary Diploma of the VM Komarov (FAI)
- Honorary Citizen of Gagarin, Kaluga, Terek (Russia), Kostanai, Zhezkazgan (Kazakhstan), Poznań (Poland)
