= Retrieval =

Retrieval may refer to:

== Computer science ==
- RETRIEVE, Tymshare database that inspired dBASE and others
- Data retrieval
- Document retrieval
- Image retrieval
- Information retrieval
- Knowledge retrieval
- Medical retrieval
- Music information retrieval
- Text retrieval

== Film and television ==
- Retrieval (film), a 2006 Polish film
- The Retrieval, a 2013 American drama film by Chris Eska
- "Retrieval" (Star Wars: The Bad Batch), a 2023 TV episode

== Other uses ==
- Recall (memory), the mental process of retrieving information from the past
- Retrieval or retrieving, a set of skills learned by a retriever dog

== See also ==
- Retriever (disambiguation)
