= Vyacheslav Zudov =

Soviet cosmonaut (1942–2024)

- Вячеслав Зудов
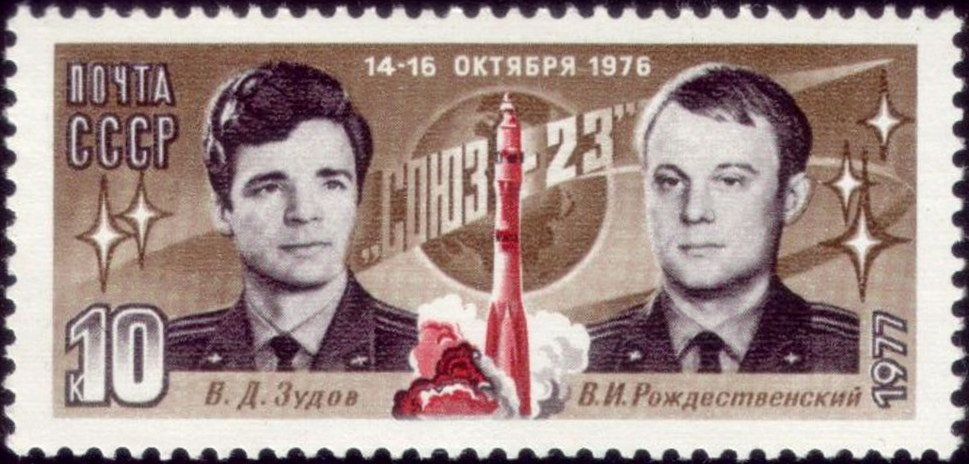
- Zudov (left) and Valery Rozhdestvensky on a 1977 Soviet stamp
- Born: 8 January 1942; Bor, Russian SFSR, Soviet Union
- Died: 12 June 2024 (aged 82)
- Occupation: Pilot
- Space career

Soviet cosmonaut
- Rank: Colonel, Soviet Air Force
- Time in space: 2d 00h 06m
- Selection: Air Force Group 3
- Missions: Soyuz 23
- Retired: 14 May 1987

Vyacheslav Dmitriyevich Zudov (Russian: Вячесла́в Дми́триевич Зу́дов, 8 January 1942 – 12 June 2024) was a Soviet cosmonaut.

== Biography ==
Zudov was selected as a cosmonaut on 23 October 1965, flew as commander on Soyuz 23 on 14–16 October 1976, and retired on 14 May 1987. He was married and had two children. Zudov died on 12 June 2024, at the age of 82. He was buried in the Federal Military Memorial Cemetery on 14 June.

== Awards ==
- Hero of the Soviet Union
- Pilot-Cosmonaut of the USSR
- Jubilee Medal "Twenty Years of Victory in the Great Patriotic War 1941-1945"
- Jubilee Medal "In Commemoration of the 100th Anniversary since the Birth of Vladimir Il'ich Lenin"
- Jubilee Medal "50 Years of the Armed Forces of the USSR"
- Medal "For Merit in Space Exploration" (Russian Federation)
