= Virginia Institute of Marine Science =

Marine research and education center in Virginia, US

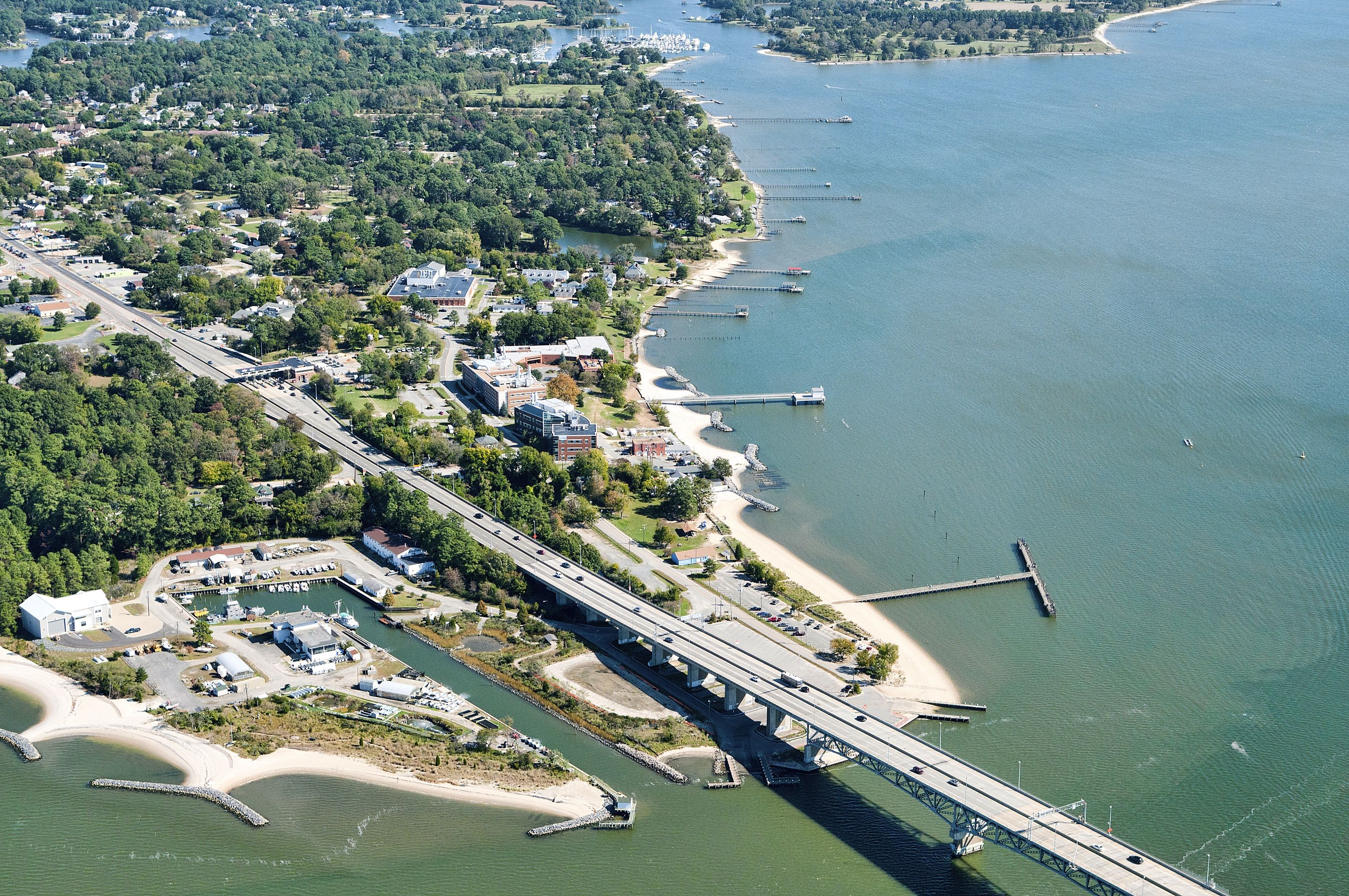
- VIMS campus in Gloucester Point, Virginia
- Established: 1940; 86 years ago
- Research type: Marine Sciences
- Dean: D. Derek Aday
- Director: D. Derek Aday
- Location: Gloucester Point, Virginia, 23062; 37°14′55.4″N 76°29′59.6″W
- Campus: 42 acres (17 ha)
- Affiliations: College of William & Mary, National Sea Grant College Program
- Website: www.vims.edu

The Virginia Institute of Marine Science (VIMS) is one of the largest marine research and education centers in the United States. Founded in 1940, VIMS is unique among marine science institutions in its legal mandate to provide research, education, and advisory services to government, citizens, and industry. Funding for VIMS comes from the Commonwealth of Virginia, grants and contracts from federal and state agencies, and private giving. The School of Marine Science (SMS) at VIMS is the graduate school in marine science for the College of William & Mary. VIMS offers M.S., Ph.D., and professional M.A. degrees in marine science. The school has 52 faculty members, an enrollment of 80-100 students, and includes 3 academic sections. VIMS' main campus is located in Gloucester Point, Virginia.

== Mission ==
Overall, the VIMS mission is "Science for the Bay, Impact for the World." VIMS provides research, education, and advisory services in marine science to Virginia, the nation, and the world. VIMS' three-part mission is mandated in the Code of Virginia.

== History ==
VIMS was started by Prof. Donald W. Davis as the William & Mary Maritime Laboratory in 1938, which in 1940 was chartered by the Commonwealth as the Virginia Fisheries Laboratory. Its original building, Maury Hall, is named for Virginian Matthew Fontaine Maury, the "Father of Modern Oceanography." VIMS' Eastern Shore Laboratory, established in 1962 in the seaside village of Wachapreague, jumpstarted Virginia's large hard-clam industry. VIMS scientists were leaders in establishing the national Sea Grant and Coastal Zone Management programs in the 1960s.

== Research programs ==
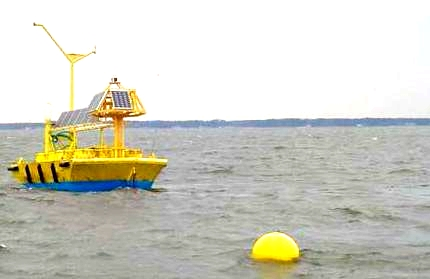
VIMS NOMAD real-time data buoy

VIMS research spans a broad range of topics. A 2009 analysis of research citations by Thomson Reuters Essential Science Indicators found VIMS among the top 1% of institutions in the fields of Plant & Animal Science and Environment & Ecology.

Early programs included:

- oyster research in the 1950s that was the seminal work on the ecology of these shellfish;
- juvenile fish and blue crab surveys in the Chesapeake Bay began in 1955; these key fishery management tools continue today;
- annual shark survey started in 1973, this is now the world's longest-running fishery independent shark survey;
- seagrass restoration efforts that are the most successful in the world, with more than 6,000 acres (24 km^{2}) restored to coastal bays.

Current active research includes:

- Coastal Research - more than 50 coastal projects on every continent including Antarctica;
- Blue Crab sustainability
- Oyster restoration and aquaculture
- Bay Grasses / Submerged Aquatic Vegetation (SAV)
- Aquatic Diseases & Immunity
- Fisheries and Aquaculture
- Global Change
- Marine Life & Processes
- Observing & Modeling - computer models using real-time data to help predict storm surge, sediment transport, and food-web dynamics.
- Coastal Economies & Recreation
- Coastal Resilience
- Pollution detection and risk of marine pollutants, including microplastics research

== Academics ==
VIMS' School of Marine Science is one of four graduate and professional schools of William & Mary. The school has 57 faculty members and a student body ranging from 80-100 students, approximately half of whom are women. M.S. and Ph.D. degrees are offered in four major areas:

- Aquatic Health Sciences - chemicals and biological factors that can deleteriously affect the health of aquatic ecosystems.
- Biological Sciences - biological, physical, and human-induced forces governing marine ecosystems on local and global scales.
- Fisheries Science - investigation of living marine resources, especially finfish and shellfish
- Physical Sciences - chemical, geological, and physical oceanography

== Facilities and research vessels ==
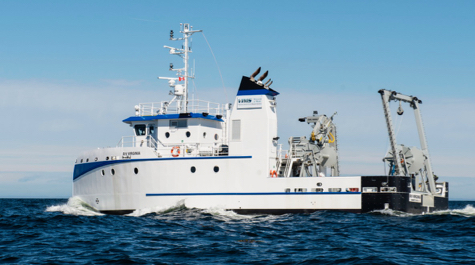
VIMS R/V Virginia

In addition to specialized facilities at the Eastern Shore Laboratory and Kaufman Aquaculture Center, the main campus includes:

- The Seawater Research Laboratory, the largest facility of its kind in the U.S., provides 800-gallons per minute to an acre of research tanks and lab space.
- The William J. Hargis, Jr. Library with 88,000 marine science volumes.
- Visitor Center with aquaria and life-sized models shows how VIMS research benefits the Chesapeake Bay and the ocean.
- Nunnally Ichthyology Collection features more than 350,000 specimens in 316 fish families from the Chesapeake Bay and surrounding waters.
- Andrews Hall, a 71,000-square-foot (6,600 m^{2}) building that features 39 laboratories, 25 faculty offices, and space for nearly 100 students, technicians, and visiting scientists. It houses the Aquaculture Genetics and Breeding Technology Center, an Autonomous Systems Laboratory, the Submerged Aquatic Vegetation program, the Dominion Conference room, and a distance-learning classroom.
- Chesapeake Bay Hall, a 64,000-square-foot (5,900 m^{2}) facility that houses programs in ecology, ecotoxicology, fishery genetics, immunology, and shellfish pathology.
- Acuff Center for Aquaculture, a 22,000-square-foot (2,000 m^{2}) facility purpose-built to advance the science of farming shellfish.

VIMS owns and operates a fleet of 40 research vessels, including many specialized for research in the Chesapeake Bay and other coastal areas. Vessels include:

- R/V Virginia (93') Purpose-built for VIMS in 2018, the Virginia is available for use both by VIMS researchers and external parties. It offers flexibility in science outfitting, rapid turn-around for frequent use, and affordable operation. The vessel is easily adaptable to evolving scientific research areas such as environmental impact studies, the servicing of ocean-observing systems, and offshore-energy exploration and development surveys.
- R/V Bay Eagle (65') is outfitted with a wet lab containing a flow-through seawater system. The Bay Eagle also has interchangeable stern decks for versatility when changing from trawling, to dredging, long lining or other applications.
- R/V Tidewater (43') designed and equipped to perform trawl surveys.

== Faculty and staff ==
Administrative Officers

- Dr. Derek Aday, Dean and Director
- Dr. Mark Luckenbach, Associate Dean of Research and Advisory Services
- Dr. Siddhartha Mitra, Associate Dean of Academic Affairs
- Marise Robbins-Forbes, Executive Director of VIMS Advancement & VIMS Foundation
- Linda Rudy, Chief Financial Officer
- Joseph Martinez, Chief Operations Officer

Section Chairs

- Dr. Courtney Harris, Chair, Section for Coastal & Ocean Processes
- Dr. Eric Hilton, Chair, Section for Natural Resources
- Dr. Bongkeun Song, Chair, Section for Ecosystem Health

Center Directors

- Dr. Jessica Small, Aquaculture Genetics and Breeding Technology Center (ABC)
- Dr. Kirk Havens, Center for Coastal Resources Management (CCRM)
- Dr. William Reay, Chesapeake Bay National Estuarine Research Reserve (CBNERR)
- Dr. Richard Snyder, Eastern Shore Laboratory
- Dr. David Rudders, Marine Advisory Services
- Dr. Troy Hartley, Virginia Sea Grant

Administrative Directors

• Gary Anderson, Chief Information Officer and Director of Information Technology & Network Services

• Betty Barrack, Director of Budget & Financial Planning

• Mark Brabham, Director of Facilities Management

• Eric Fidler, Safety & Environmental Programs Manager

• Lisa Nickel, interim contact for William J. Hargis Library

• Susan Maples, Director of Development

• Connie Motley, Executive Director, Office of Sponsored Programs

• Carol Tomlinson, Executive Director, Finance & Supply Chain Operations

• Timothy Turner, Director of Marine Operations

A directory of all faculty, staff, and students is available online.

== Satellite campuses ==
- The Eastern Shore Laboratory, located on the Virginia Eastern Shore,(37.61°N 75.69°W) serves as both a field station for research and teaching and as a site for resident research in coastal ecology and aquaculture. The laboratory is internationally recognized for shellfish research, with important contributions to molluscan ecology and culture.
- The Kauffman Aquaculture Center is located on a tributary of the Rappahannock River (37.588619°N 76.433754°W). It serves VIMS' Aquaculture Genetics and Breeding Technology Center with quarantine facilities for both native and non-native species.

== See also ==
- Chesapeake Research Consortium
- MV Retriever
