= Soyuz 23 =

Crewed flight of the Soyuz programme

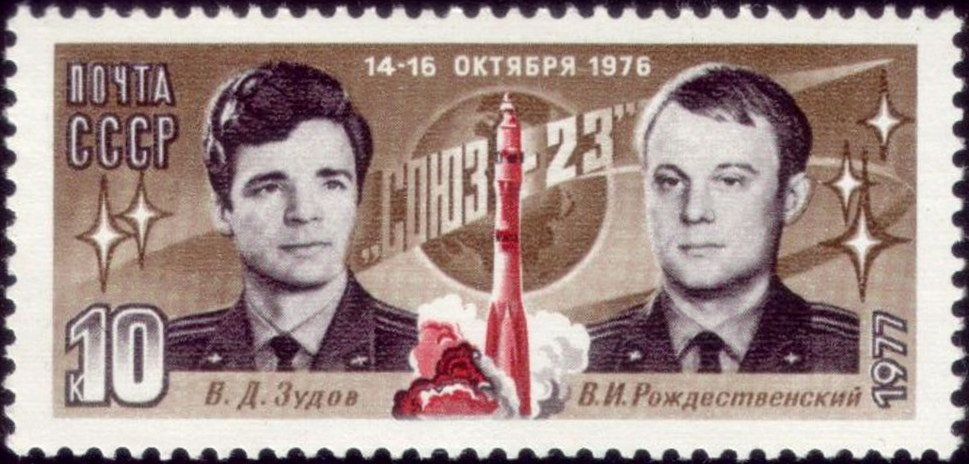
- Commemoration stamp of Vyacheslav Zudov and Valery Rozhdestvensky
- Operator: Soviet space program
- COSPAR ID: 1976-100A
- SATCAT no.: 09477
- Mission duration: 2 days 6 minutes 35 seconds
- Orbits completed: 32

Spacecraft properties
- Spacecraft: Soyuz 7K-T No.10
- Spacecraft type: Soyuz 7K-T/A9
- Manufacturer: NPO Energia
- Launch mass: 6750 kg
- Landing mass: 1200 kg

Crew
- Crew size: 2
- Members: Vyacheslav Zudov; Valery Rozhdestvensky
- Callsign: Радон (Radon - "Radon")

Start of mission
- Launch date: 14 October 1976, 17:39:18 UTC
- Rocket: Soyuz
- Launch site: Baikonur, Site 1/5

End of mission
- Landing date: 16 October 1976, 17:45:53 UTC
- Landing site: Lake Tengiz, Kazakhstan

Orbital parameters
- Reference system: Geocentric orbit
- Regime: Low Earth orbit
- Perigee altitude: 243.0 km
- Apogee altitude: 275.0 km
- Inclination: 51.6°
- Period: 89.5 minutes
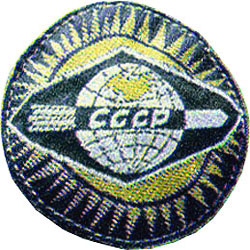
- Vimpel Diamond patch Soyuz programme

Soyuz 23 (Russian: Союз 23, Union 23) was an October 1976, Soviet crewed space flight, the second to the Salyut 5 space station. Cosmonauts Vyacheslav Zudov and Valery Rozhdestvensky arrived at the station, but an equipment malfunction did not allow docking and the mission had to be aborted.

The crew returned to Earth, but landed on partially frozen Lake Tengiz, the first crewed splashdown in the Soviet space program. While there was no concern about any immediate threat to the crew, the capsule sank under the surface of the frozen lake, and recovery took nine hours owing to fog and other adverse conditions. The landing is the only example of an unintentional splashdown of a crewed spacecraft.

== Crew ==
Position	Cosmonaut
Commander	Vyacheslav Zudov; Only spaceflight
Flight engineer	Valery Rozhdestvensky; Only spaceflight

=== Backup crew ===
Position	Cosmonaut
Commander	Viktor Gorbatko
Flight engineer	Yuri Glazkov

=== Reserve crew ===
Position	Cosmonaut
Commander	Anatoly Berezovoy
Flight engineer	Mikhail Lisun

== Mission highlights ==
Soyuz 23 was launched 14 October 1976 with an estimated 73- to 85-day mission planned aboard the orbiting Salyut 5 space station. Other sources suggest a 17- to 24-day mission was a more likely intention. It was the first visit to the station after the sudden termination of the Soyuz 21 mission in August 1976. However, on 15 October 1976, during the automatic approach phase, the automatic docking system malfunctioned before the craft was within 100 metres of the station. Crews were trained for a manual dock, but not for a manual approach. The mission, accordingly, had to be abandoned.

The craft had only two days of battery power, so systems were powered off, including the radio, to conserve power. The day's landing opportunity had already passed, so they had to wait for the next day's landing opportunity near the Baikonur Cosmodrome. On 16 October 1976, Soyuz 23 returned to Earth and landed at 17:45:53 UTC, but weather conditions were poor and the cosmonauts experienced an unusual recovery. They landed on a freezing Lake Tengiz (average depth 2.5 m, max depth 6.7 m), at 8 km from shore, in the middle of a blizzard, with fog and temperatures at −22 °C. It was the first water landing by a Soviet crew. The capsule was designed to land in any conditions, even in a body of water, so the only concern was the increased difficulty in finding the capsule and crew.

The parachute quickly sank beneath the water and dragged the capsule and its crew beneath the surface; in addition, an electrical short resulting from the water impact caused the reserve parachute to deploy accidentally. The capsule cooled in the freezing water, and the cosmonauts removed their pressure suits and donned their normal flight suits, expecting a quick rescue. The parachutes became waterlogged and pulled the capsule onto its side, preventing the hatch from being opened. The transmission antennas were also under water, so the crew could not communicate with rescue teams. The capsule's beacons could not be seen in the heavy fog, and rubber rafts sent to reach the capsule were blocked by ice and sludge. Amphibious vehicles were airlifted to the vicinity, but could not reach the capsule owing to bogs surrounding the lake. Accordingly, the rescue was called off until dawn. The cosmonauts were safe, but they were low on power, so they were forced to shut down everything but a small interior light.

The next morning, frogmen were dropped in by helicopters and attached flotation devices to the Soyuz craft. The capsule was too heavy to be lifted by the helicopter, so it was dragged to shore. The recovery operation had taken nine hours. No attempt was made to open the hatch because the recovery crews assumed the cosmonauts were dead, and they called for a special team to remove their bodies. Eventually, eleven hours after splashdown, the capsule was opened, and the crew was found unconscious due to CO_{2} accumulation in the submerged and powered- down vessel. The cosmonauts survived, although they were badly chilled (the interior of the descent module was coated with frost).

Press releases by Soviet news agency TASS announced that there had been a water landing and that the cosmonauts were recovered safely, but made no mention of the rescue operation, the details of which were not revealed until the era of glasnost a decade later.

== Mission parameters ==
- Mass: 6,750 kg (14,880 lb)
- Perigee: 243.0 km (151.0 mi)
- Apogee: 275.0 km (170.9 mi)
- Inclination: 51.6°
- Period: 89.5 minutes

== See also ==
- Splashdown
- List of spaceflight-related accidents and incidents
