= Splashdown =

Method of landing a spacecraft by parachute in a body of water

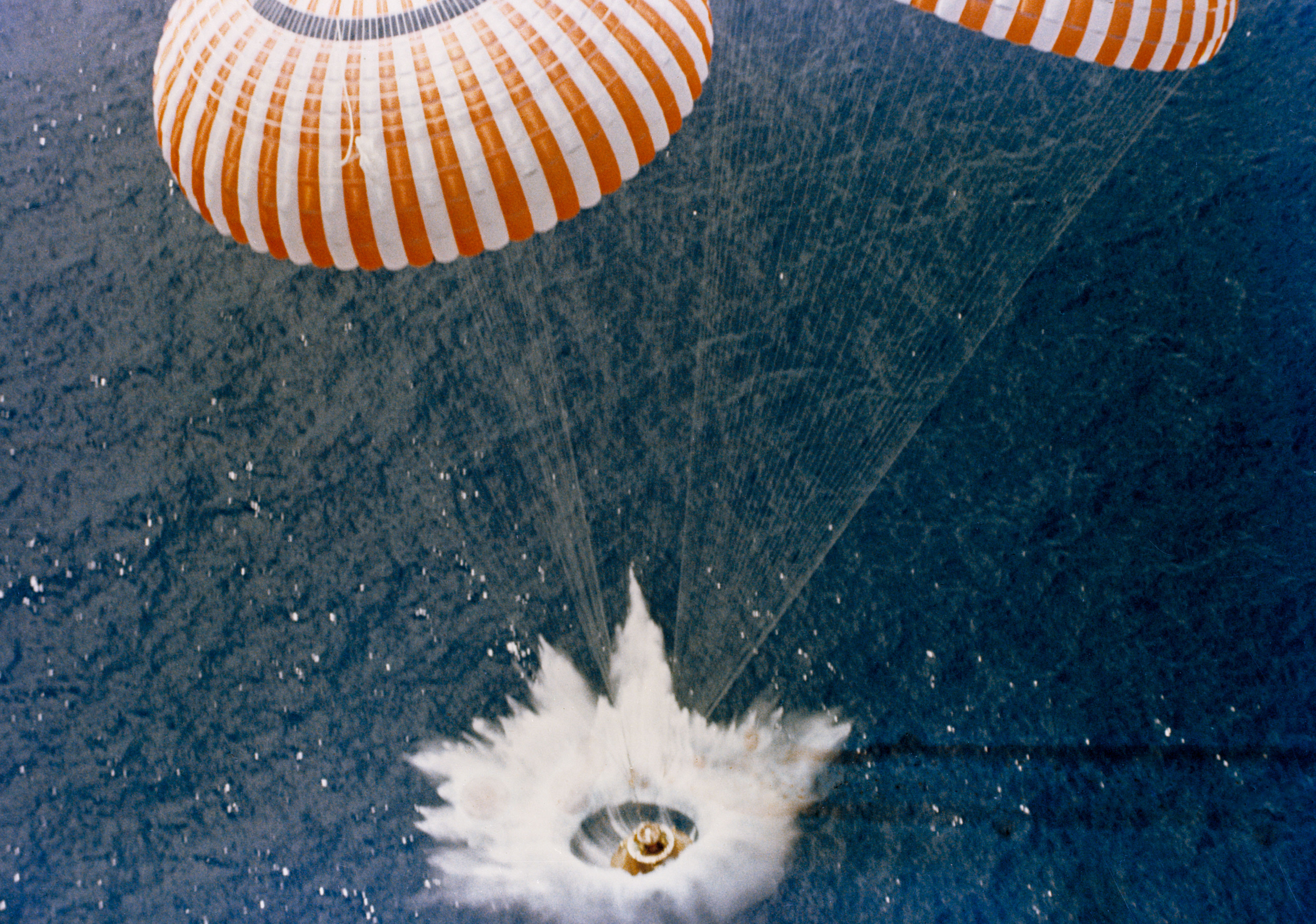
Apollo 15 makes contact with the Pacific Ocean.

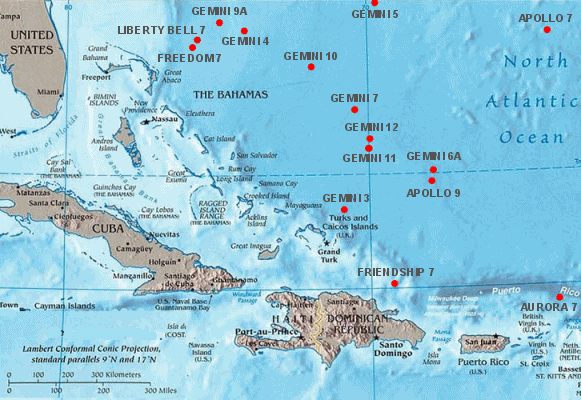
Locations of Atlantic Ocean splashdowns of American spacecraft prior to the 21st century

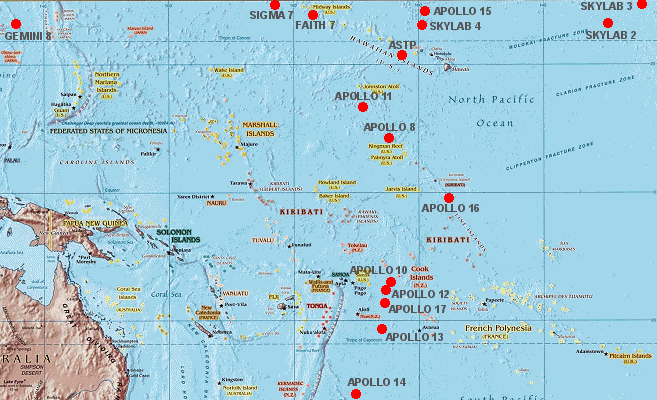
Locations of Pacific Ocean splashdowns of American spacecraft prior to the 21st century

Splashdown is the method of landing a spacecraft or launch vehicle in a body of water, usually by parachute. This has been the primary recovery method of American capsules including NASA's Mercury, Gemini, Apollo and Orion along with the private SpaceX Dragon. It is also possible for the Boeing Starliner, Russian Soyuz, and the Chinese Shenzhou crewed capsules to land in water in case of contingency. NASA recovered the Space Shuttle solid rocket boosters (SRBs) via splashdown, as is done for Rocket Lab's Electron first stage.

As the name suggests, the vehicle parachutes into an ocean or other large body of water. Due to its low density and viscosity, water cushions the spacecraft enough that there is no need for a braking rocket to slow the final descent as is the case with Russian and Chinese crewed space capsules or airbags as is the case with the Starliner.

The American practice came in part because American launch sites are on the coastline and launch primarily over water. Russian launch sites such as Baikonur Cosmodrome are far inland, and most early launch aborts would descend on land.

== History ==
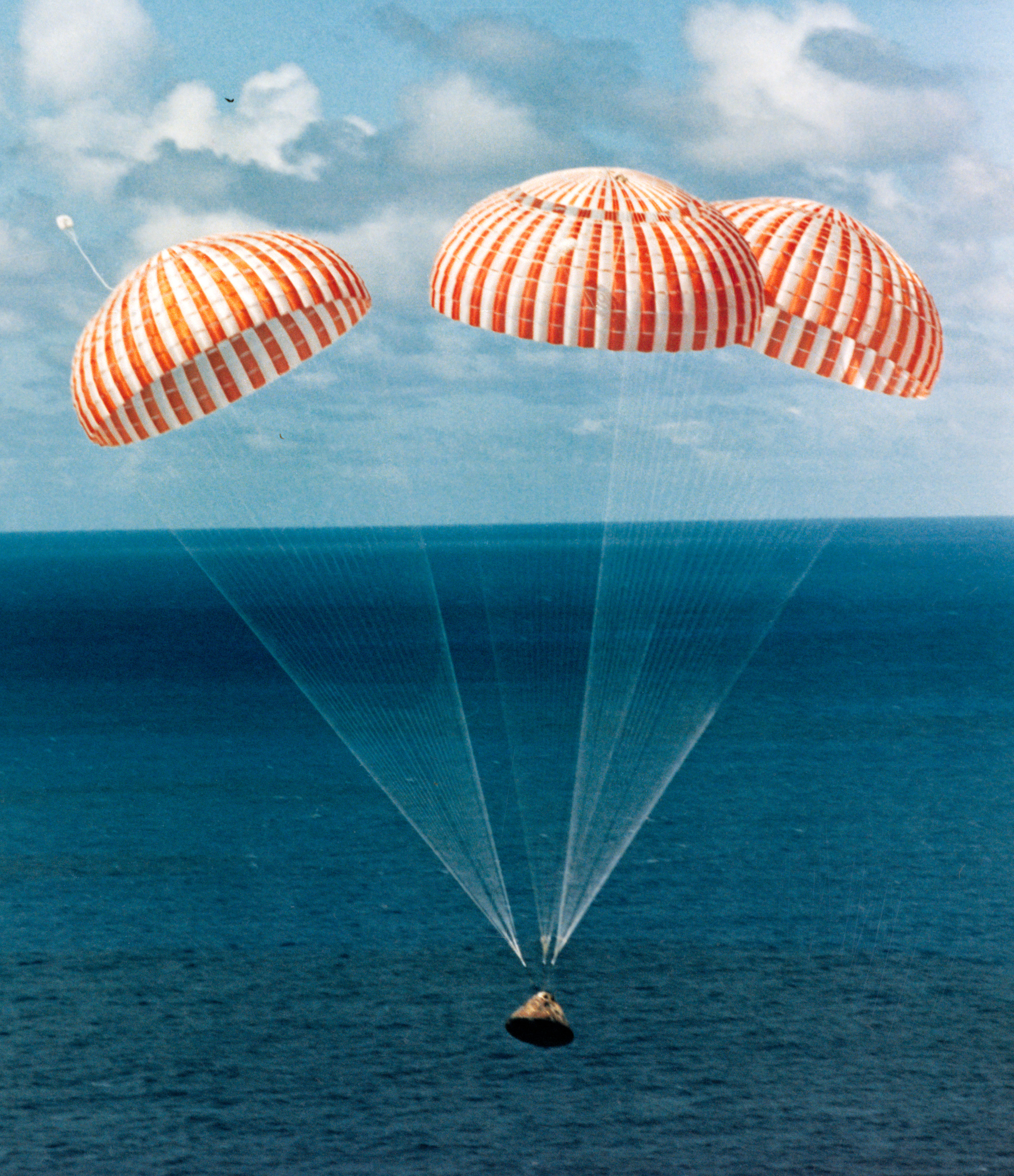
Apollo 14 returns to Earth, 1971.

The splashdown method of landing was used for Mercury, Gemini, and Apollo (including Skylab, which used Apollo capsules) missions, and is used for Artemis missions. Soyuz 23 unintentionally landed on a freezing lake with slushy patches of ice during a snowstorm.

On early Mercury flights, a helicopter attached a cable to the capsule, lifted it from the water and delivered it to a nearby ship. This was changed after the sinking of Liberty Bell 7. All later Mercury, Gemini and Apollo capsules had a flotation collar (similar to a rubber life raft) attached to the spacecraft to increase their buoyancy. The spacecraft would then be brought alongside a ship and lifted onto deck by crane.

After the flotation collar is attached, a hatch on the spacecraft is usually opened. At that time, some astronauts decide to be hoisted aboard a helicopter for a ride to the recovery ship and some decided to stay with the spacecraft and be lifted aboard ship via crane. All Gemini and Apollo flights (Apollos 7 to 17) used the former, while Mercury missions from Mercury 6 to Mercury 9, as well as all Skylab missions and Apollo-Soyuz used the latter, especially the Skylab flights as to preserve all medical data. During the Gemini and Apollo programs, NASA used MV Retriever for the astronauts to practice water egress.

Apollo 11 was America's first Moon landing mission and marked the first time that humans walked on the surface of another planetary body. The possibility of the astronauts bringing pathogens from the Moon back to Earth was remote, but not ruled out. To contain any possible contaminants at the scene of the splashdown, the astronauts donned special Biological Isolation Garments and the outside of the suits were scrubbed prior to the astronauts being hoisted aboard USS Hornet and escorted safely inside a Mobile Quarantine Facility.

The splashdown of the SpaceX CRS-25 resupply mission

Both the SpaceX Dragon 1 and Dragon 2 capsules were designed to use the splashdown method of landing. (Note: Dragon 2 was originally intended to propulsively land using its SuperDraco engines, but this was abandoned except for contingency in case of parachute failure.) The original cargo Dragon splashed down in the Pacific Ocean off the coast of Baja California. At the request of NASA, both the crew and cargo variations of the Dragon 2 capsule splash down off the coast of Florida, either in the Atlantic Ocean or the Gulf of Mexico.

The early design concept for Orion (then known as the Crew Exploration Vehicle) featured recovery on land using a combination of parachutes and airbags, although it was also designed to make a contingency splashdown if needed. Due to weight considerations, the airbag design concept was dropped for Orion, and it conducts landings via splashdown in the Pacific Ocean off the coast of California.

== Disadvantages ==
Perhaps the most dangerous aspect is the possibility of the spacecraft flooding and sinking. For example, when the hatch of Gus Grissom's Liberty Bell 7 capsule blew prematurely, the capsule sank and Grissom almost drowned. Since the spacecraft's flooding will occur from a location in its hull where it ruptures first, it is important to determine the location on the hull that experiences the highest loading. This location along the impacting side is determined by the surrounding "air cushion" layer, which deforms the water surface before the moment of impact, and results in a non-trivial geometry of the liquid surface during first touch-down. Soyuz 23 was dragged under a frozen lake by its parachutes. The crew became incapacitated by carbon dioxide and were rescued after a nine-hour recovery operation.

If the capsule comes down far from any recovery forces, the crew may be stranded at sea for an extended period of time. As an example, Scott Carpenter in Aurora 7 overshot the assigned landing zone by 400 kilometers (250 mi). These recovery operation mishaps can be mitigated by placing several vessels on standby in different locations, but this can be an expensive option.

Exposure to salt water can have adverse effects on vehicles intended for reuse, such as Dragon.

== Launch vehicles ==
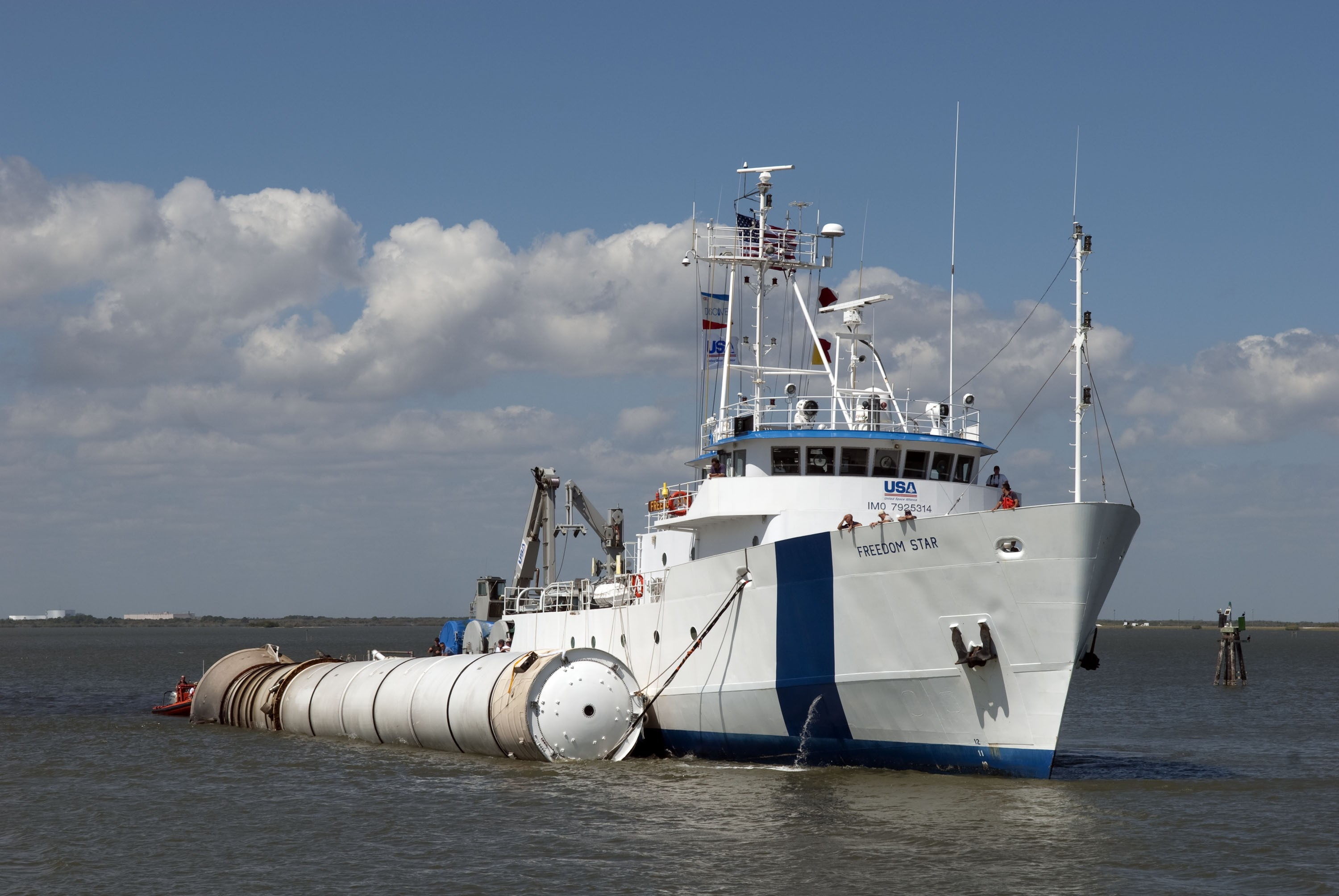
Space Shuttle SRB being recovered by Freedom Star after splashing down on STS-133

Some reusable launch vehicles recover components via splashdown. This was first seen with the Space Shuttle SRBs, with STS-1 launching in 1981. Out of 135 launches, NASA recovered all but two sets of SRBs.

SpaceX has conducted propulsive splashdowns of the Falcon 9 first stage, Super Heavy booster, and Starship spacecraft. These vehicles are designed to land on land or modified barges and do not always survive intact after tipping over in the water; SpaceX has mainly conducted propulsive splashdowns for development flights. After the launch of CRS-16, the booster experienced a control issue and splashed down in the ocean instead of making an intended landing at Landing Zone 1.

Rocket Lab intended to catch the first stage of their Electron rocket with a helicopter as it descended under parachute, but abandoned this idea in favor of parachute splashdown. In 2020, Rocket Lab completed their first booster recovery.

== List of spacecraft splashdowns ==
=== Crewed spacecraft ===
#	Spacecraft	Agency	Landing date	Coordinates	Recovery ship	Miss distance (km)	Reference
1	Freedom 7	NASA	May 5, 1961	27°13.7′N 75°53′W	USS Lake Champlain	5.6 km (3.5 mi)	
2	Liberty Bell 7	NASA	July 21, 1961	27°32′N 75°44′W	USS Randolph	9.3 km (5.8 mi)	
3	Friendship 7	NASA	February 20, 1962	21°26′N 68°41′W	USS Noa (USS Randolph**)	74	
4	Aurora 7	NASA	May 24, 1962	19°27′N 63°59′W	USS John R. Pierce (USS Intrepid**)	400	
5	Sigma 7	NASA	October 3, 1962	32°06′N 174°28′W	USS Kearsarge	7.4	
6	Faith 7	NASA	May 16, 1963	27°20′N 176°26′W	USS Kearsarge	8.1	
7	Gemini 3	NASA	March 23, 1965	22°26′N 70°51′W	USS Intrepid	111	
8	Gemini 4	NASA	June 7, 1965	27°44′N 74°11′W	USS Wasp	81	
9	Gemini 5	NASA	August 29, 1965	29°44′N 69°45′W	USS Lake Champlain	270	
10	Gemini 7	NASA	December 18, 1965	25°25′N 70°07′W	USS Wasp	12	
11	Gemini 6A	NASA	December 16, 1965	23°35′N 67°50′W	USS Wasp	13	
12	Gemini 8	NASA	March 17, 1966	25°14′N 136°0′E	USS Leonard F. Mason (USS Boxer**)	2	
13	Gemini 9A	NASA	June 6, 1966	27°52′N 75°0′W	USS Wasp	0.7	
14	Gemini 10	NASA	July 21, 1966	26°45′N 71°57′W	USS Guadalcanal	6	
15	Gemini 11	NASA	September 15, 1966	24°15′N 70°0′W	USS Guam	5	
16	Gemini 12	NASA	November 15, 1966	24°35′N 69°57′W	USS Wasp	5	
17	Apollo 7	NASA	October 22, 1968	27°32′N 64°04′W	USS Essex	3	
18	Apollo 8	NASA	December 27, 1968	8°7.5′N 165°1.2′W	USS Yorktown	2	
19	Apollo 9	NASA	March 13, 1969	23°15′N 67°56′W	USS Guadalcanal	5	
20	Apollo 10	NASA	May 26, 1969	15°2′S 164°39′W	USS Princeton	2.4	
21	Apollo 11	NASA	July 24, 1969	13°19′N 169°9′W	USS Hornet	3.13	
22	Apollo 12	NASA	November 24, 1969	15°47′S 165°9′W	USS Hornet	3.7	
23	Apollo 13	NASA	April 17, 1970	21°38′S 165°22′W	USS Iwo Jima	1.85	
24	Apollo 14	NASA	February 9, 1971	27°1′S 172°39′W	USS New Orleans	1.1	
25	Apollo 15	NASA	August 7, 1971	26°7′N 158°8′W	USS Okinawa	1.85	
26	Apollo 16	NASA	April 27, 1972	0°43′S 156°13′W	USS Ticonderoga	0.55	
27	Apollo 17	NASA	December 19, 1972	17°53′S 166°7′W	USS Ticonderoga	1.85	
28	Skylab 2	NASA	June 22, 1973	24°45′N 127°2′W	USS Ticonderoga		
29	Skylab 3	NASA	September 25, 1973	30°47′N 120°29′W	USS New Orleans		
30	Skylab 4	NASA	February 8, 1974	31°18′N 119°48′W	USS New Orleans		
31	Apollo CSM-111	NASA	July 24, 1975	22°N 163°W	USS New Orleans	1.3	
32	Soyuz 23	USSR	October 16, 1976	Lake Tengiz	Mi-8 helicopter		
33	Crew Dragon Demo-2	SpaceX	August 2, 2020	29°48′N 87°30′W	GO Navigator		
33	Crew Dragon Crew-1	SpaceX	May 2, 2021	29°32′N 86°11′W	GO Navigator		
34	Inspiration4	SpaceX	September 18, 2021		GO Searcher		
35	Crew Dragon Crew-2	SpaceX	November 7, 2021		GO Navigator		
35	Axiom Mission 1	SpaceX	April 25, 2022		Megan		
36	Crew Dragon Crew-3	SpaceX	May 6, 2022		Shannon		
37	Crew Dragon Crew-4	SpaceX	October 14, 2022		Megan		
38	Crew Dragon Crew-5	SpaceX	March 11, 2023		Shannon		
39	Axiom Mission 2	SpaceX	May 31, 2023		Megan		
40	Polaris Dawn	SpaceX	September 15, 2024				
41	Artemis II	NASA	April 10, 2026		USS John P. Murtha		

=== Uncrewed spacecraft ===
Spacecraft	Agency	Landing date	Coordinates	Recovery ship	Miss distance
Jupiter AM-18 (Able and Baker)	USAF	May 28, 1959	48 to 96 km (30 to 60 mi) N Antigua Island	USS Kiowa	16 km (9.9 mi)
Mercury-Big Joe	NASA	September 9, 1959	2,407 km (1,496 mi) SE Cape Canaveral	USS Strong	925 km (575 mi)
Mercury-Little Joe 2 Sam The Rhesus Monkey	NASA	December 4, 1959	319 km (198 mi) SE Wallops Island, Virginia	USS Borie	? km
Mercury-Redstone 1A	NASA	December 19, 1960	378.2 km (235.0 mi) SE Cape Canaveral	USS Valley Forge	12.9 km (8.0 mi)
Mercury-Redstone 2	NASA	January 31, 1961	675.9 km (420.0 mi) SE Cape Canaveral	USS Donner	209.2 km (130.0 mi)
Mercury-Atlas 2	NASA	February 21, 1961	2,293.3 km (1,425.0 mi) SE Cape Canaveral	USS Donner	20.9 km (13.0 mi)
Discoverer 25 (Corona 9017)	USAF	June 16, 1961			mid-air recovery missed
Mercury-Atlas 4	NASA	September 13, 1961	257.5 km (160.0 mi) E of Bermuda	USS Decatur	64.4 km (40.0 mi)
Mercury-Atlas 5	NASA	November 29, 1961	804.7 km (500.0 mi) SE of Bermuda	USS Stormes	? km
Gemini 2	NASA	January 19, 1965	16°33.9′N 49°46.27′W 3,423.1 km (2,127.0 mi) downrange from KSC	USS Lake Champlain	38.6 km (24.0 mi)
AS-201	NASA	February 26, 1966	8°11′S 11°09′W 8,472 km (5,264 mi) downrange from KSC	USS Boxer	? km
AS-202	NASA	August 25, 1966	16°07′N 168°54′E 804.7 km (500.0 mi) southwest of Wake Island	USS Hornet	? km
Gemini 2-MOL	USAF	November 3, 1966	8,149.7 km (5,064.0 mi) SE KSC near Ascension Island	USS La Salle	11.26 km (7.00 mi)
Apollo 4	NASA	November 9, 1967	30°06′N 172°32′W	USS Bennington	16 km (9.9 mi)
Apollo 6	NASA	April 4, 1968	27°40′N 157°59′W	USS Okinawa	? km
Zond 5	USSR	September 21, 1968	32°38′S 65°33′E	USSR recovery naval vessel Borovichy and Vasiliy Golovin	105 km (65 mi)
Zond 8	USSR	October 27, 1970	730 km (450 mi) SE of the Chagos Archipelago, Indian Ocean	USSR recovery ship Taman	24 km
Cosmos 1374	USSR	June 4, 1982	17°S 98°E 560 km (350 mi) S of Cocos Islands, Indian Ocean	USSR recovery ship	? km
Cosmos 1445	USSR	March 15, 1983	556 km (345 mi) S of Cocos Islands, Indian Ocean	USSR recovery ship	? km
Cosmos 1517	USSR	December 27, 1983	near Crimea, Black Sea	USSR recovery ship	? km
Cosmos 1614	USSR	December 19, 1984	? km W of the Crimea, Black Sea	USSR recovery ship	? km
COTS Demo Flight 1	SpaceX	December 8, 2010	800 km (500 mi) west of Baja California, Mexico, Pacific Ocean	?	0.8 km (0.50 mi)
Dragon C2+	SpaceX	May 31, 2012	26°55′N 120°42′W	?	?
CRS SpX-1	SpaceX	October 28, 2012	?	American Islander	?
CRS SpX-2	SpaceX	March 27, 2013	?	American Islander	?
Exploration Flight Test 1	NASA	December 5, 2014	23.6°N 116.4°W, 443 kilometres (275 mi) west of Baja California	USS Anchorage	
Crew Dragon Demo-1	SpaceX	March 8, 2019	In the Gulf of Mexico, off the coast of Pensacola, Florida	GO Searcher	
SpaceX CRS-21	SpaceX	January 14, 2020	In the Gulf of Mexico, off the coast of Tampa, Florida	GO Navigator	
Artemis I	NASA	December 11, 2022	Pacific Ocean, west of Baja California	USS Portland	4 nm
IFT-4	SpaceX	June 6, 2024	Indian Ocean		
IFT-5	SpaceX	October 13, 2024	Indian Ocean		
IFT-6	SpaceX	November 19, 2024	Indian Ocean		
IFT-10	SpaceX	August 26, 2025	Indian Ocean		
IFT-11	SpaceX	October 13, 2025	Indian Ocean		
IFT-12	SpaceX	May 22, 2026	Indian Ocean		
IFT-13	SpaceX	July 24, 2026	Indian Ocean	Go australis, Normad ranger, Skimmer Tide and Boskalis Forte	

== Gallery ==
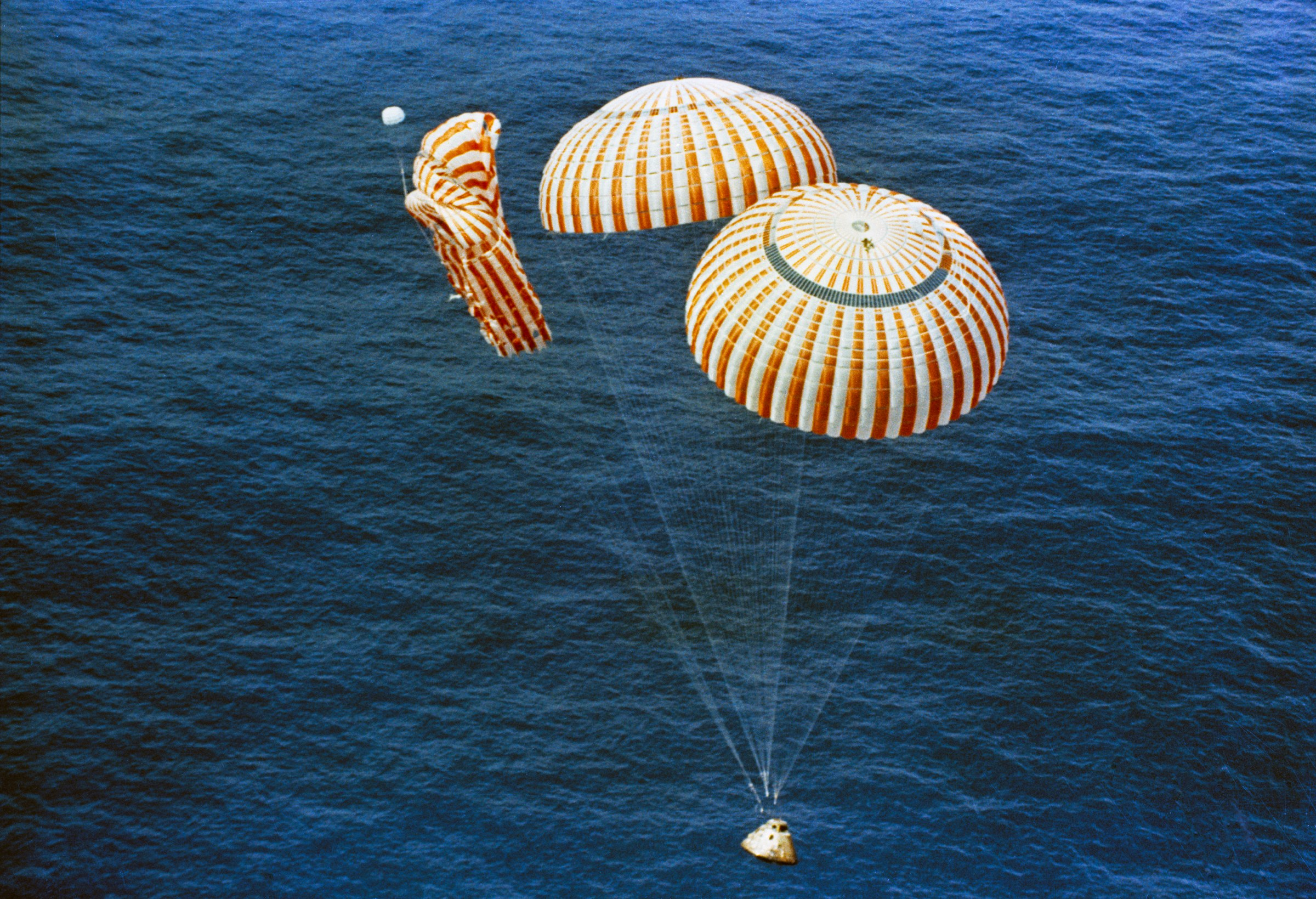
The Apollo 15 spacecraft splashed down safely despite a parachute failure. (NASA)

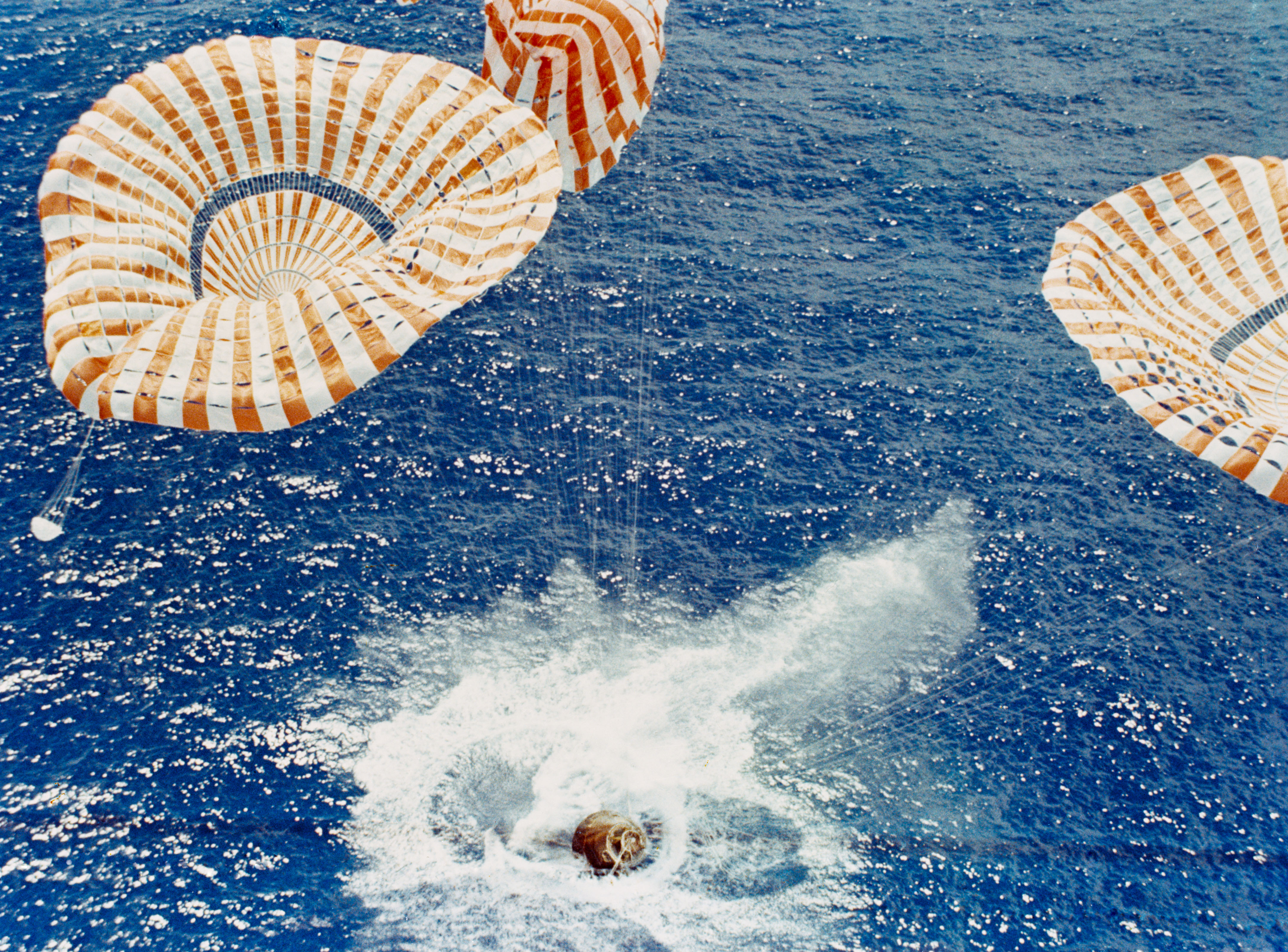
Apollo 15 splashdown (NASA)

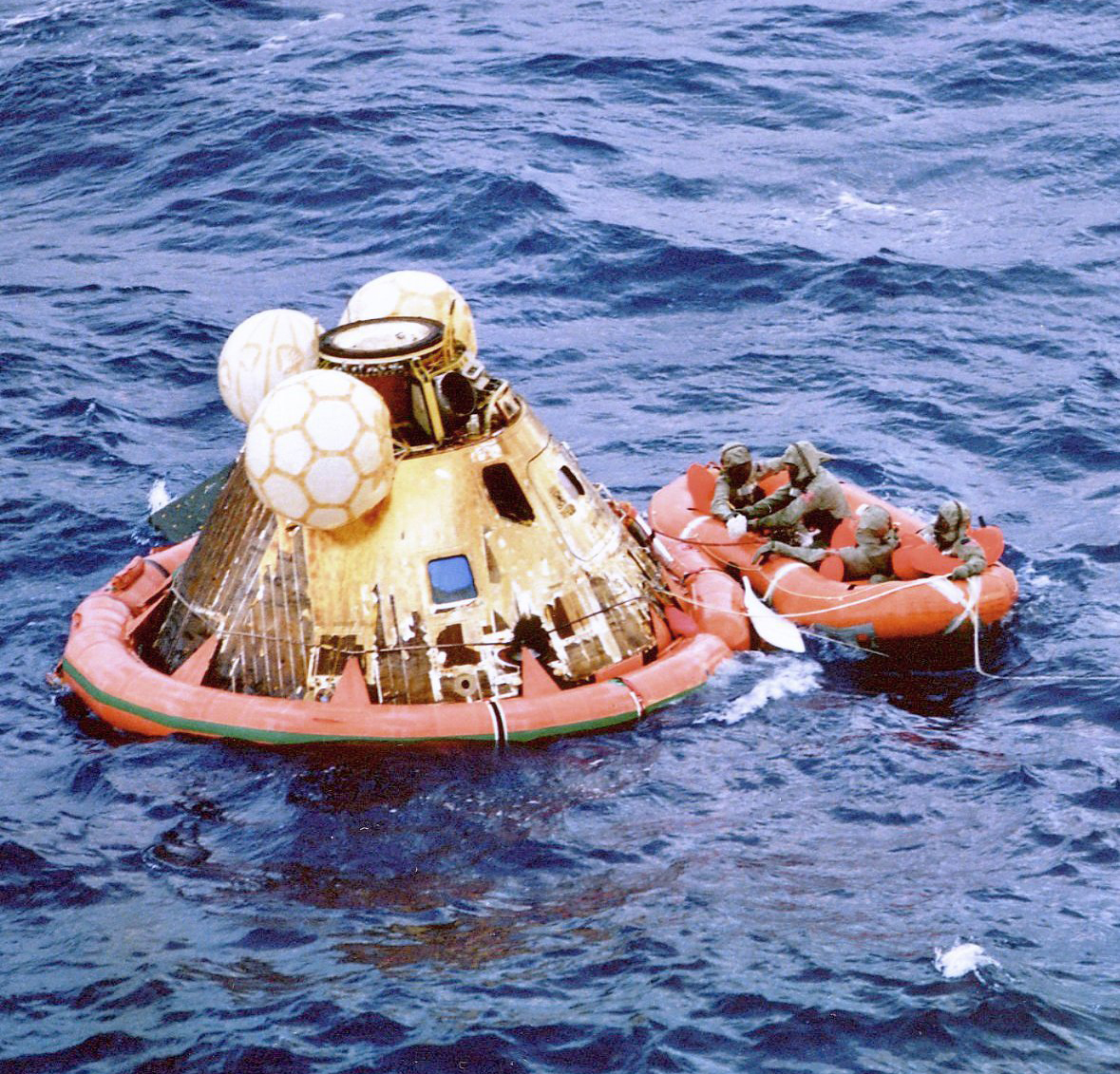
Apollo 11 after splashdown (NASA)

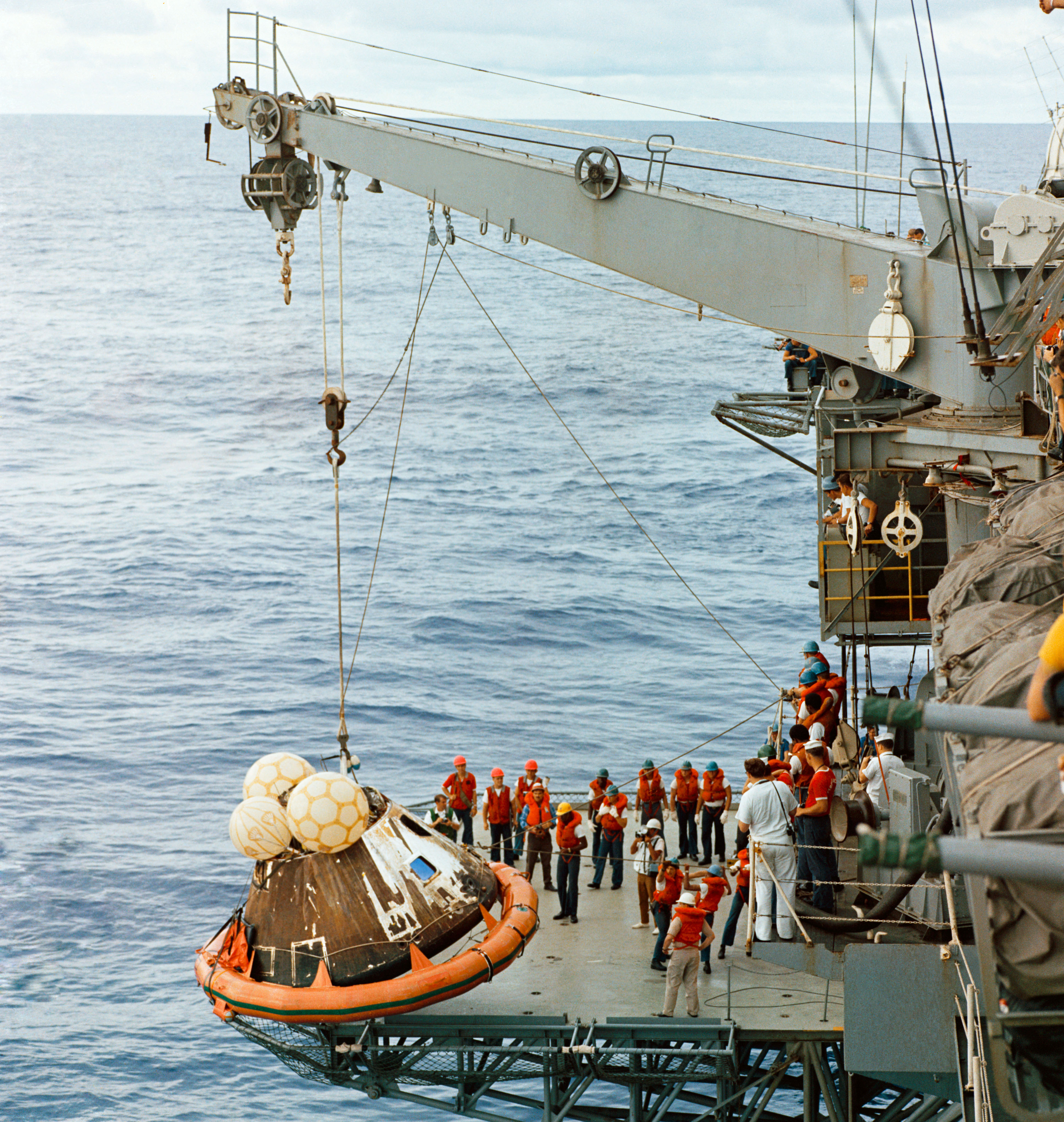
Apollo 13 hoisted onto ship (NASA)

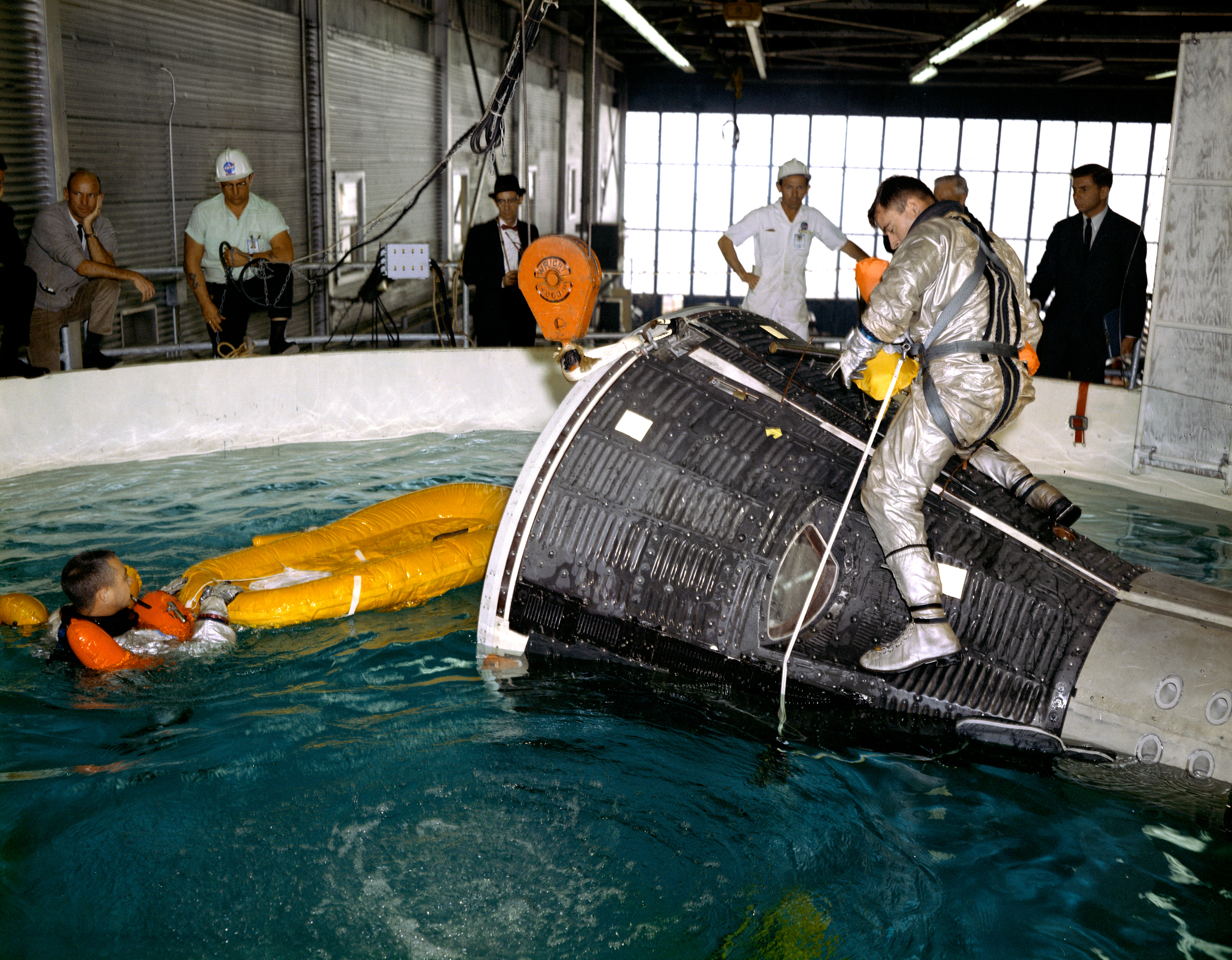
Gemini water egress training

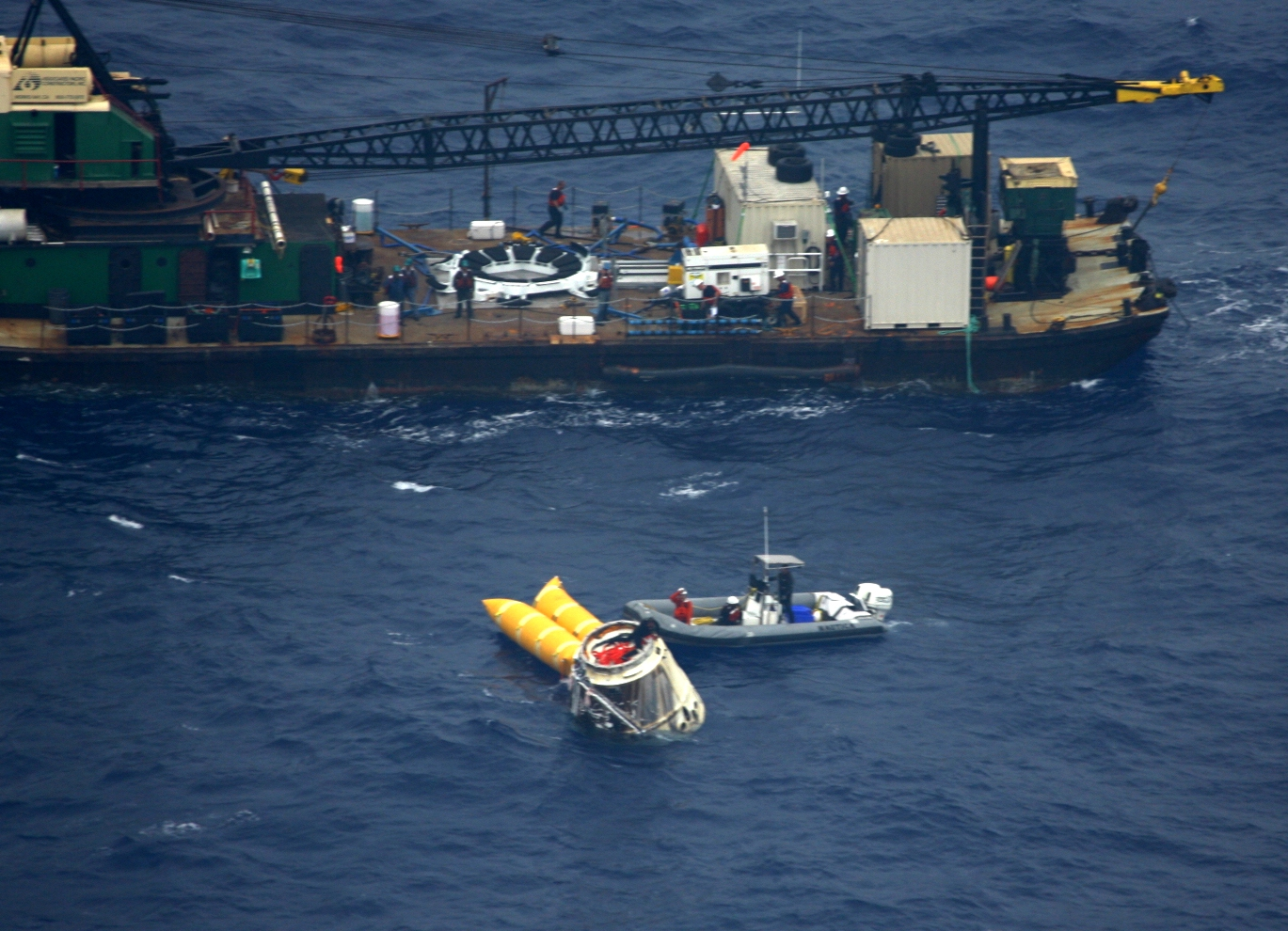
Recovery of the Dragon C2+ on May 31, 2012

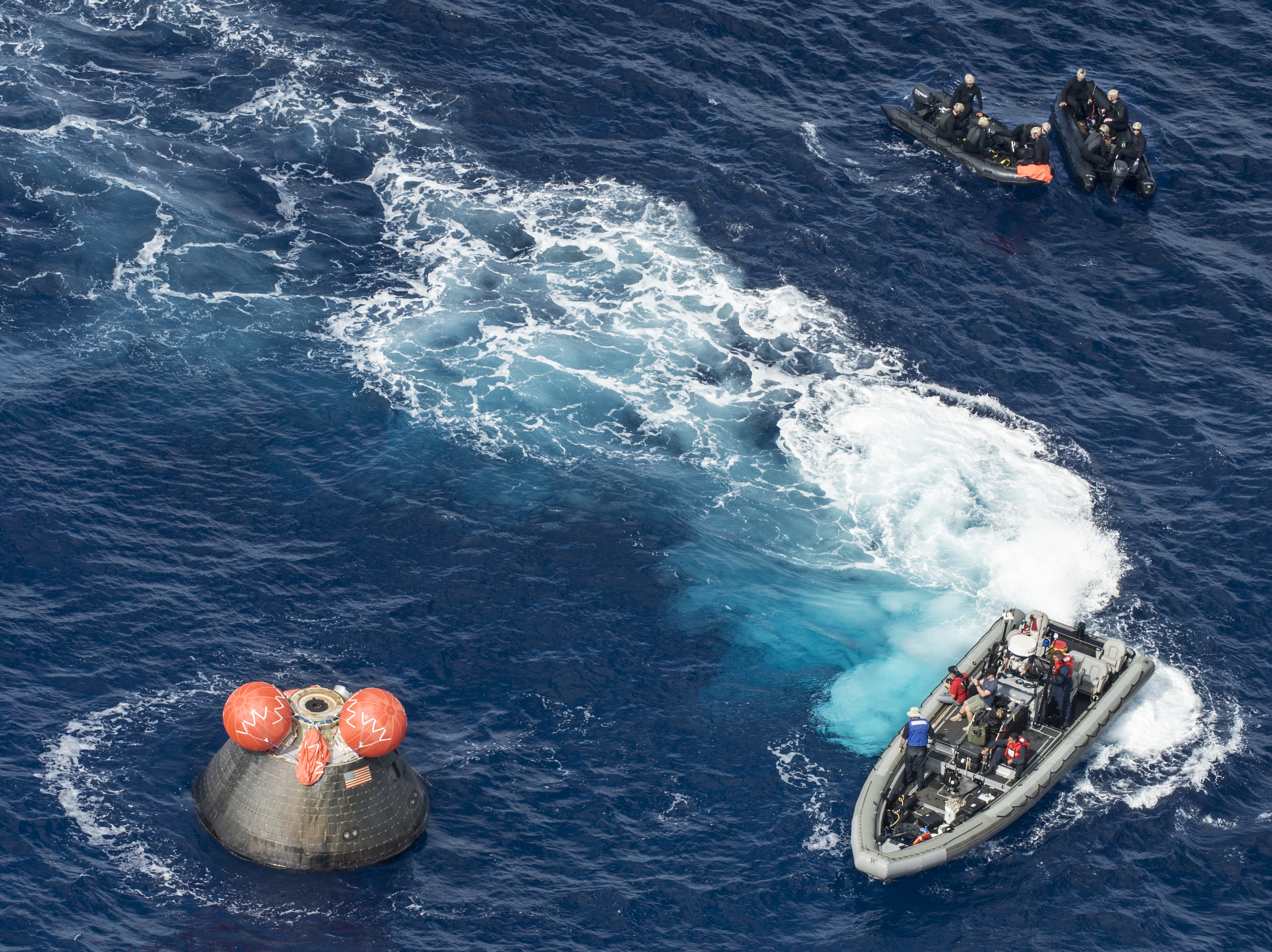
Recovery of the EFT-1 Orion, December 5, 2014

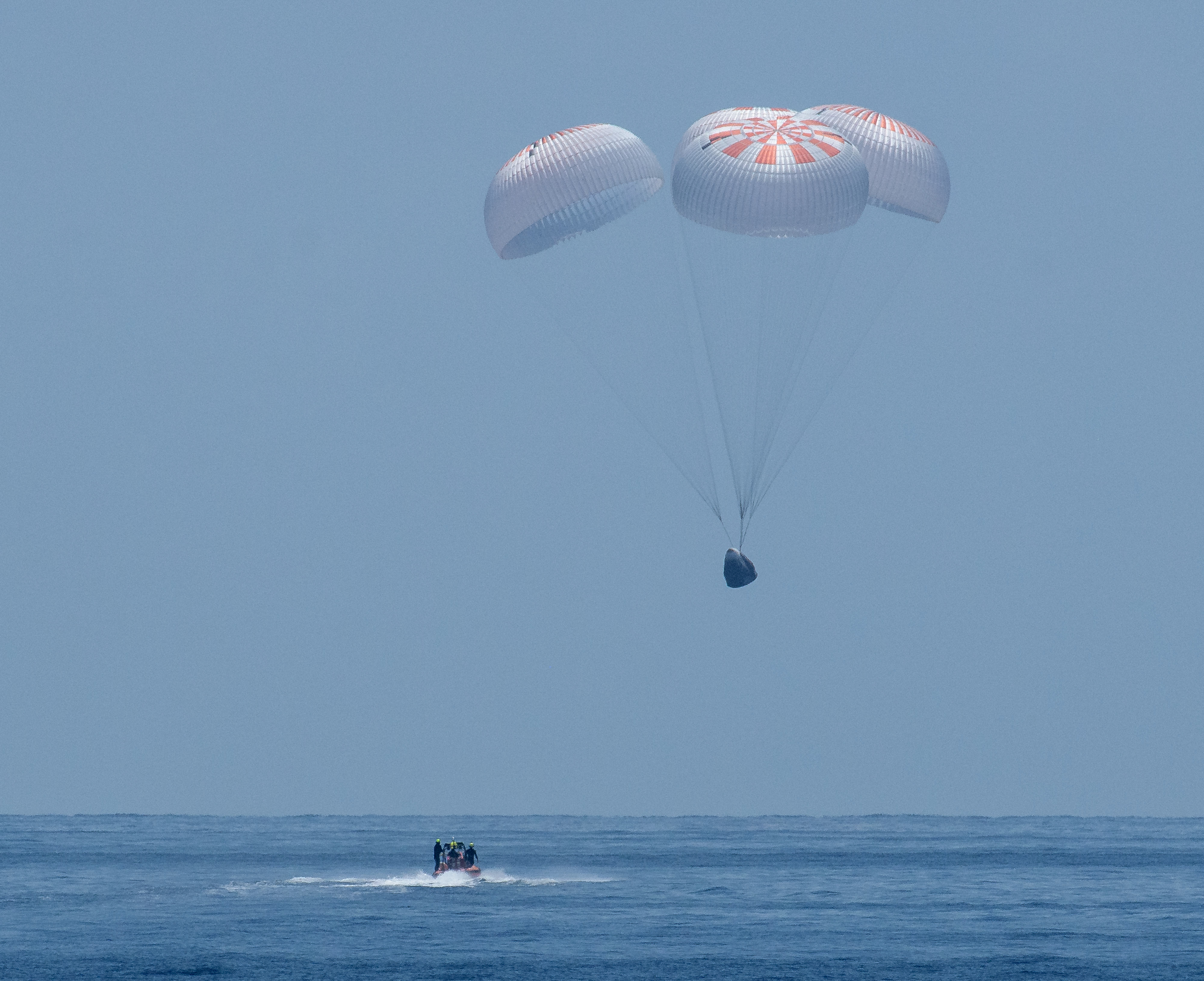
Landing of SpaceX Demo-2, 2 August 2020

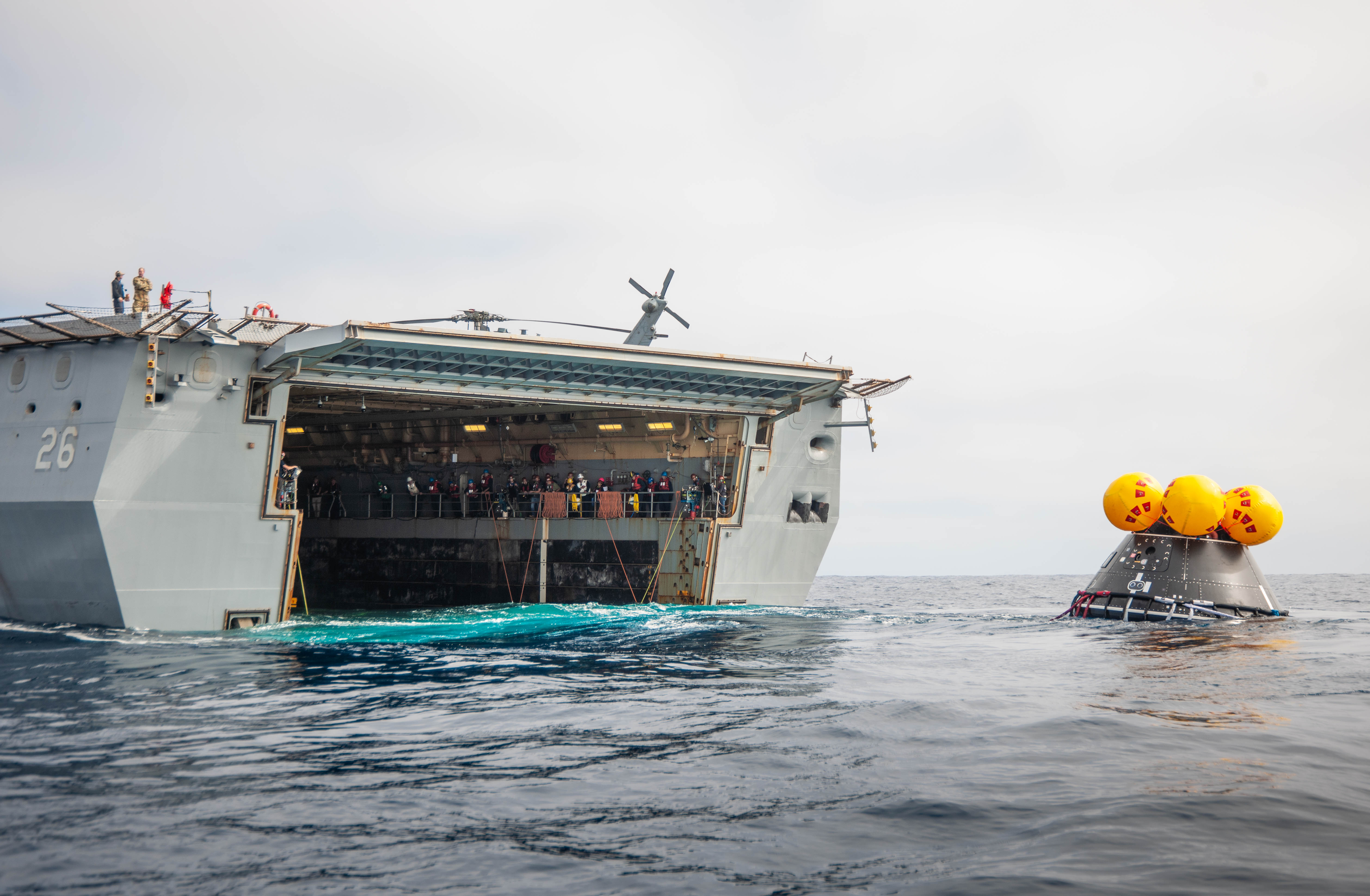
Artemis II Orion capsule well dock Underway Recovery Test 10 (URT-10)

== See also ==
- Apollo program – 1961–1972 American crewed lunar exploration program
- Apollo–Soyuz Test Project – First international crewed spaceflight mission
- Helicopter 66 – Individual United States Navy helicopter flown in support of NASA
- Project Gemini – 1961–1966 US human spaceflight program
- Project Mercury – Initial American crewed spaceflight program (1958–1963)
- Skylab – First space station launched and operated by NASA (1973–1979)
- SpaceX Dragon 1 – Partially reusable cargo space capsule
- SpaceX Dragon 2 – 2020s class of partially reusable spacecraft
- Water landing – Aircraft landing on a body of water
- Zond program – Series of Soviet robotic space probes launched between 1964 and 1970

== Bibliography ==
- Ezell, Linda Neumann (1988), NASA Historical Data Book (PDF), vol. II Programs and Projects 1958 - 1968 (NASA SP-4012), archived (PDF) from the original on October 9, 2022
- Ezell, Linda Neumann (1988), NASA Historical Data Book (PDF), vol. III - Programs and Projects 1969 - 1978 (SP-4012), archived (PDF) from the original on October 9, 2022
- Orloff, Richard W., Apollo By The Numbers - A Statistical Reference (NASA SP-2000-4029) (PDF), p. 143, archived (PDF) from the original on October 9, 2022
