= Retriever (disambiguation) =

A retriever is a dog that returns game to a hunter. The word may also refer to:

- Retriever (album), 2004 album by Ron Sexsmith
- Retriever Communications, a mobile communications company
- Retriever Activities Center, an arena on the campus of the University of Maryland, Baltimore County
- Retriever (Dungeons & Dragons), the Construct of Dungeons and Dragons
- Retriever, a Lycos information summarization product
- HMS Retriever, a British R-class destroyer launched in 1917
- MV Retriever, a NASA vessel
- UMBC Retrievers, the athletic program of the University of Maryland, Baltimore County
