= MV Retriever =

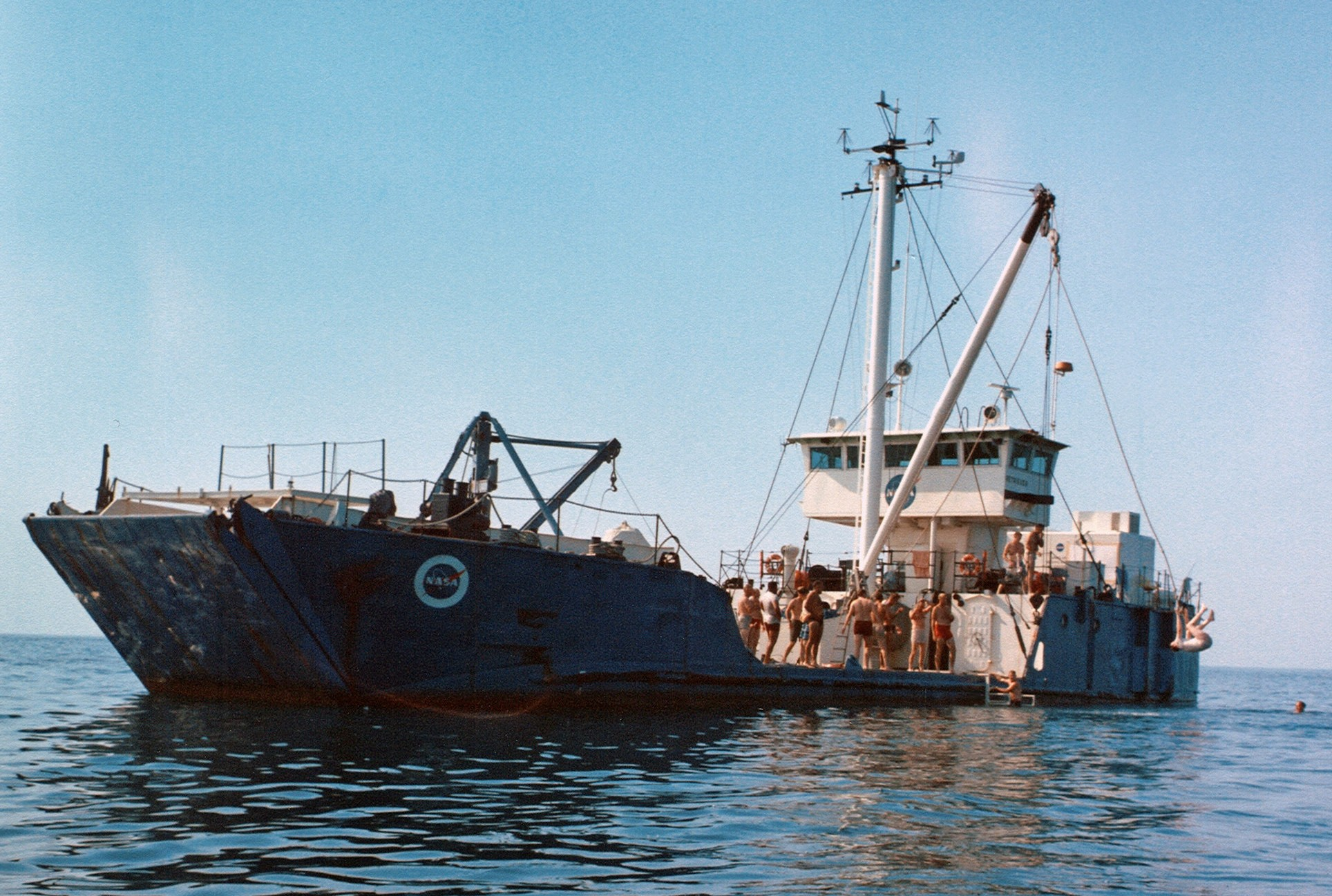
- MV Retriever in October 1966 (Apollo 1 training)

History

United States
- Name: MV Retriever
- Owner: NASA
- Operator: NASA
- Builder: Avondale Shipyards in New Orleans
- Laid down: August 1954
- Launched: 1954
- In service: 1954
- Out of service: 1972
- Fate: Transferred to the Virginia Institute of Marine Science (VIMS)

General characteristics
- Class & type: LCU-1466
- Displacement: 180 long tons (180 t); 360 long tons (370 t) (landing)
- Length: 119 ft 0 in (36.27 m)
- Beam: 34 ft 0 in (10.36 m)
- Draught: 6 ft (1.8 m) forward; 2 ft 9 in (0.84 m) aft (landing)
- Propulsion: 3 Gray Marine 225 hp (168 kW) diesel engines, triple screws
- Speed: 10 knots (19 km/h; 12 mph)
- Range: 700 mi (1,100 km)
- Capacity: 150 short tons (140 t) cargo
- Complement: 1 officer, 12 enlisted

MV Retriever was a World War II-era Landing Craft Utility transferred to NASA from the U.S. Army. It was used to train United States astronauts for post-splashdown ocean recovery operations and water egress from their command modules during the Gemini and Apollo programs from 1963 to 1972. It operated primarily in Galveston Bay and the Gulf of Mexico.

MV Retriever was one of 500 Mk V LCTs built (numbered, not named). LCU-1530 was acquired by NASA under a reimbursable loan agreement dated 4 March 1963, from the U.S. Army at Ft. Eustis, Virginia.

The sides of the vessel's midsection were cut down, a new bridge built and a hoist added for NASA use. It was under the jurisdiction of the Manned Spacecraft Center's Landing and Recovery Division, and its captains included Frank M. Gammon Sr., CWO, US Army and Dino E. Bernardi, USCG (1971–72).

In 1972, NASA transferred the MV Retriever to the Virginia Institute of Marine Science (VIMS) in Gloucester, Virginia, where it was used to support marine research in the Chesapeake Bay area until it was retired.

== Gallery ==
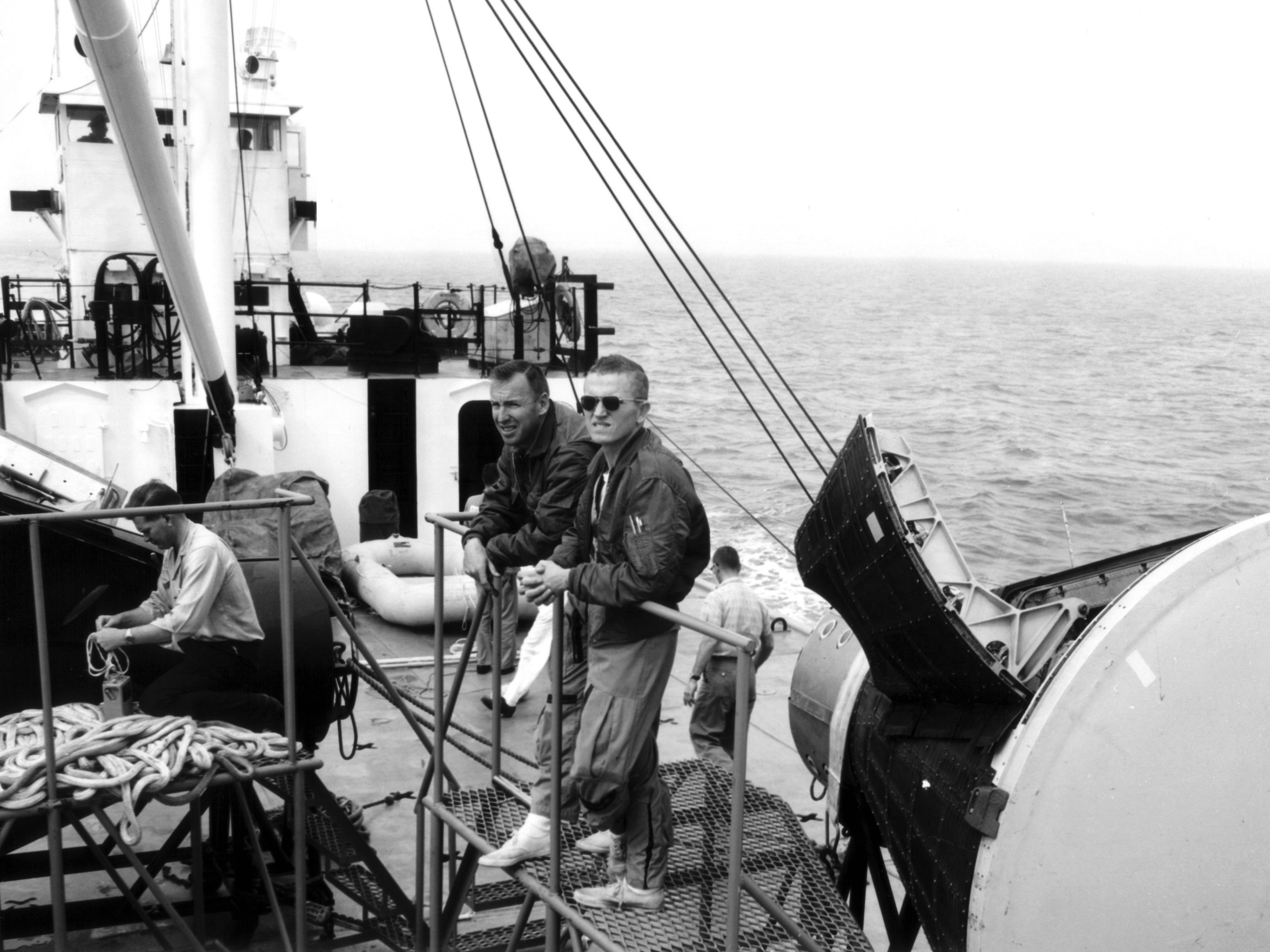
Gemini 4 backup crew training, February 25, 1965

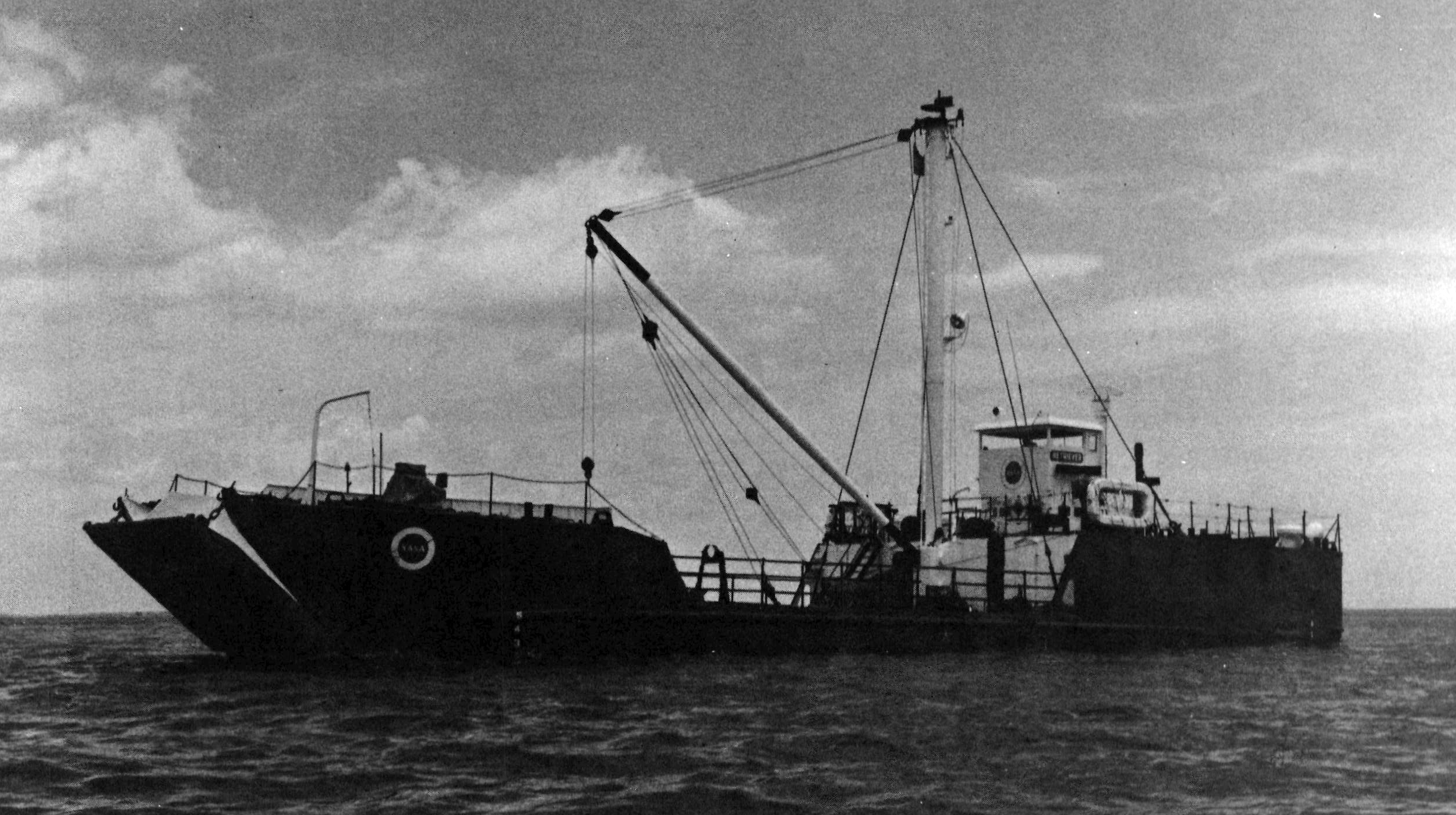
Retriever in 1963
