= Valery Rozhdestvensky =

Soviet cosmonaut (1939–2011)

- Валерий Рождественский
- Rozhdestvensky in 1981
- Born: 13 February 1939; Leningrad, Soviet Union
- Died: 31 August 2011 (aged 72)
- Occupations: Engineer, Soviet Navy
- Space career

Cosmonaut
- Time in space: 2d 00h 06m
- Selection: 1965
- Missions: Soyuz 23

Valery Ilyich Rozhdestvensky (Russian: Валерий Ильич Рождественский; 13 February 1939 – 31 August 2011) was a Soviet cosmonaut.

Rozhdestvensky was born in Leningrad and graduated from the Higher Military Engineering School of Soviet Navy in Pushkin in engineering. From 1961 to 1965 he was commander of a deepsea diving unit in the Baltic Sea War Fleet.

Rozhdestvensky was selected as a cosmonaut on 23 October 1965 and flew as Flight Engineer on Soyuz 23. After his space flight he continued to work with the space program at the Yuri Gagarin Cosmonaut Training Center. He retired on 24 June 1986 and worked with Metropolis Industries.

He was married with one child. He died on 31 August 2011 at the age of 72.

== Awards ==
- Hero of the Soviet Union
- Pilot-Cosmonaut of the USSR
- Order of Lenin
- Order for Service to the Homeland in the Armed Forces of the USSR 3rd class
- Medal "For Merit in Space Exploration"
