= Blue Origin NS-33 =

2025 sub-orbital human spaceflight

- Mission type: Sub-orbital human spaceflight
- Mission duration: 10 minutes, 14 seconds
- Apogee: 106 km (66 mi)

Spacecraft properties
- Spacecraft: RSS Kármán Line
- Manufacturer: Blue Origin

Crew
- Crew size: 6
- Members: Allie Kuehner; Carl Kuehner; Leland Larson; Freddie Rescigno, Jr.; Owolabi Salis; James (Jim) Sitkin

Start of mission
- Launch date: 29 June 2025, 14:39:56 UTC (10:39 a.m. Eastern)
- Rocket: New Shepard (NS5)
- Launch site: Corn Ranch, LS-1
- Contractor: Blue Origin

End of mission
- Landing date: 29 June 2025, 14:50:10 UTC
- Landing site: Corn Ranch
- Blue Origin NS-33 mission patch New Shepard flights

Blue Origin NS-33 was a sub-orbital spaceflight operated by Blue Origin as part of its New Shepard space tourism program. The flight launched from Launch Site One in West Texas on June 29, 2025, at 15:40 UTC (10:40 a.m. Eastern), after launch attempts on June 21 and June 22 were scrubbed due to high winds and cloud cover, respectively. The mission lasted approximately 10 minutes, carrying six passengers to an apogee of about 105 km (65 mi), crossing the Kármán line, the FAI-recognized boundary of space.

The booster performed a powered landing approximately 7.5 minutes after liftoff, with the capsule landing under parachutes about three minutes later, within a few hundred meters of the booster. This mission marked the 13th human flight and the 33rd overall flight for the New Shepard program, and was the third crewed New Shepard flight in two and a half months, following NS-31 on April 14 and NS-32 on May 31.

== Passengers ==
The flight's passengers included conservationist Allie Kuehner, real estate developer Carl Kuehner, philanthropist and former bus company executive Leland Larson, entrepreneur Freddie Rescigno, Jr., attorney, retired politician and financial consultant Owolabi Salis, and retired labor attorney James (Jim) Sitkin. Allie and Carl Kuehner were the second married couple to fly together on a New Shepard mission, following Marc and Sharon Hagle on NS-20 and NS-28. Owolabi Salis, a Nigerian-America base lawyer is the first Nigerian to go to space.

Position	Passenger
Tourist	(United States) James (Jim) Sitkin; First spaceflight
Tourist	(United States) Leland Larson; First spaceflight
Tourist	(Nigeria) Owolabi Salis; First spaceflight
Tourist	(United States) Freddie Rescigno, Jr. First spaceflight
Tourist	(United States) Allie Kuehner; First spaceflight
Tourist	(United States) Carl Kuehner; First spaceflight
