= Blue Origin NS-15 =

2021 American uncrewed sub-orbital spaceflight

- Mission type: Sub-orbital spaceflight, flight test
- Mission duration: 10 minutes, 10 seconds
- Apogee: 107 km (66 mi)

Spacecraft properties
- Spacecraft: RSS First Step
- Manufacturer: Blue Origin

Start of mission
- Launch date: April 14, 2021, 11:50 am CDT (16:50 UTC)
- Rocket: New Shepard (NS4)
- Launch site: Corn Ranch, LS-1
- Contractor: Blue Origin

End of mission
- Landing date: April 14, 2021, 12:00:10 pm CDT (17:00:10 UTC)
- Landing site: Corn Ranch
- Blue Origin NS-15 mission patch New Shepard flights

Blue Origin NS-15 was a sub-orbital spaceflight of Blue Origin's New Shepard rocket, which launched on April 14, 2021. It was New Shepards 2nd flight in 2021 and Blue Origin's 15th overall flight to go into space.

== Flight ==
The vehicle lifted off at 11:50 am CDT (16:50 UTC) on April 14, 2021, from Launch Site 1 (LS-1) at Blue Origins' Corn Ranch launch site in Texas, United States. Main Engine Cutoff (MECO) occurred at T+2 minutes 23 seconds into the flight. At T+2:44, the capsule separated from the booster, from which point it began to experience Zero G, until T+5:35, giving the payloads 2 minutes and 51 seconds of Zero G for data gathering. RSS First Step passed the Karman Line at T+3 minutes 32 seconds after launch, until T+4:41, spending a total of 1 minute, 9 seconds in space. The capsule reached apogee at T+4:07, reaching an altitude of 351,221 feet (107,052 meters), while the booster reached an apogee of 350,840 feet (106,936 meters). The booster deployed its fins during descent, before reigniting its single BE-3 engine, coming to a near-hover and touching down at T+7 minutes 24 seconds into the flight on Blue Origin's North Landing Pad, ~3.3 km (~2 miles) away from the launch site. At 12:00:10 pm CDT (17:00:10 UTC) the capsule landed at the Corn Ranch site, 10 minutes, 10 seconds after liftoff. The booster supporting this mission was New Shepard Booster 3 (NS3), a booster specifically dedicated to cargo missions. This was its 7th total flight with a 183-day turnaround time, it was paired with the RSS First Step capsule on top for this flight.

== Payload ==
Unlike other New Shepard cargo flights, NS-15 did not carry science experiments, as the flight was a test to prepare for carrying humans. The only payloads on board were a mannequin, dubbed "Mannequin Skywalker", which was outfitted with various sensors to monitor the environment inside the capsule and the effects on the body. The other payload was 25,000 postcards from around the world as part of the "Postcards to Space" program developed by Club for the Future, a Blue Origin non-profit company.
