= Blue Origin NS-25 =

2024 private crewed sub-orbital spaceflight

- Mission type: Sub-orbital human spaceflight
- Mission duration: 9 minutes, 53 seconds
- Apogee: 107 km (66 mi)

Spacecraft properties
- Spacecraft: RSS First Step
- Manufacturer: Blue Origin

Crew
- Crew size: 6
- Members: Mason Angel; Sylvain Chiron; Ed Dwight; Kenneth Hess; Carol Schaller; Gopichand Thotakura

Start of mission
- Launch date: May 19, 2024, 9:35:09 am CDT (14:35:09 UTC)
- Rocket: New Shepard (NS4)
- Launch site: Corn Ranch, LS-1
- Contractor: Blue Origin

End of mission
- Landing date: May 19, 2024, 9:45:02 am CDT (14:45:02 UTC)
- Landing site: Corn Ranch
- Blue Origin NS-25 mission patch New Shepard flights

Blue Origin NS-25 was a sub-orbital spaceflight mission, operated by Blue Origin, which was launched on May 19, 2024, using the New Shepard rocket.

NS-25 was the first New Shepard flight to carry humans since NS-22 in August 2022. The New Shepard fleet was grounded following a September 2022 engine failure on a cargo mission. The vehicle resumed flight in December 2023.

NS-25 carried six passengers to a maximum altitude of 107 km (66 mi). At T+03:12, the passengers experienced weightlessness, and at T+03:31, the capsule passed the Kármán line. The booster landed seven minutes after launch, while the capsule, deploying only two of its three parachutes, touched down ten minutes after liftoff. Launch commentators assured that the capsule is designed to land safely with only two parachutes.

== Passengers ==
| Position | Passenger |
|---|---|
| Tourist | (United States) Kenneth Hess; First spaceflight |
| Tourist | (United States) Carol Schaller; First spaceflight |
| Tourist | (France) Sylvain Chiron; First spaceflight |
| Tourist | (United States) Ed Dwight; First spaceflight |
| Tourist | (India) Gopichand Thotakura; First spaceflight |
| Tourist | (United States) Mason Angel; First spaceflight |

Ed Dwight is often cited as the first African-American astronaut candidate. He made it to the second round of a 1961 Air Force program from which NASA selected astronauts, but was not selected. When he eventually flew as a space tourist on the Blue Origin suborbital flight at age 90 years, 253 days, he became the oldest person to reach space.

Gopichand Thotakura became just the second Indian citizen to go to space, and the first to do so on a suborbital mission and as a tourist. A graduate of Embry–Riddle Aeronautical University, who had founded a pilot training program and an air ambulance service, used his spot on NS-25 to advocate for more female pilot schools in India.

Mason Angel is a Venture Capitalist who, through his firm Industrious Ventures, has heavily invested in both commercial and national security space startups. He is a member of the board of directors of Space For Humanity, Stoke Space, Xona Space, and Lunar Outpost.

Sylvain Chiron is the founder of Brasserie du Mont-Blanc, a major french brewery, that had at age 16, attempted to pursue a career as an astronaut before ultimately becoming a pilot for the French Air Force.
