= RSS First Step =

Blue Origin New Shepard capsule

- Type: Space capsule
- Class: New Shepard crew capsule
- Owner: Blue Origin
- Manufacturer: Blue Origin

Specifications
- Rocket: New Shepard

History
- Location: Van Horn, Texas
- First flight: 14 January 2021; Blue Origin NS-14
- Last flight: Active
- Flights: 16

New Shepard crew capsules

RSS First Step (Reusable Space Ship First Step) is a New Shepard space capsule, built and operated by American spaceflight company Blue Origin. It is the third New Shepard capsule to fly to space, and the first to fly passengers. Its first flight was the NS-14 mission, which reached an altitude of 107 km (66 mi) on 14 January 2021.

== History ==
RSS First Step is the third New Shepard capsule built by Blue Origin, and the first designed to carry passengers. It flew to space for the first time on 14 January 2021, during the NS-14 spaceflight. NS-14 also served as the maiden flight of the NS4 propulsion module. The following flight, NS-15, which was also flown uncrewed by First Step and NS4, tested boarding and deboarding in what Blue Origin called an "astronaut operational exercise."

First Step flew Blue Origin's first crewed flight on 20 July 2021, carrying founder Jeff Bezos and three other passengers to space. This made Texas the fourth state to launch humans into space, after Florida, California, and New Mexico. As of November 2022, it has flown five subsequent crewed spaceflights, carrying a total of 31 people into space, including one (Evan Dick) twice.

The New Shepard fleet was grounded from September 2022 until December 2023 due to a failure during the NS-23 mission. The capsule used during the mission, RSS H.G. Wells, managed to abort successfully, while the booster was destroyed. The next mission NS-24 (uncrewed) and the next crewed mission NS-25 took place following an investigation.

== Flights ==
| Mission | Launch date (UTC) | Landing date (UTC) | Crew | Duration | Remarks | Outcome |
|---|---|---|---|---|---|---|
| NS-14 | 14 January 2021 | 14 January 2021 | Uncrewed | ~10 minutes | Uncrewed test flight. Maiden flight of NS4 propulsion module. | Success |
| NS-15 | 14 April 2021 | 14 April 2021 | Uncrewed | ~10 minutes | Uncrewed test flight. Passenger process test conducted. Four Blue Origin employees serve as stand-in passengers. | Success |
| NS-16 | 20 July 2021, 13:11 | 20 July 2021, 13:21 | (United States) Jeff Bezos; (United States) Mark Bezos; (United States) Wally Funk; (Netherlands) Oliver Daemen | 10 minutes, 18 seconds | First crewed flight of the New Shepard vehicle and first crewed spaceflight from Texas. Carried Blue Origin founder Jeff Bezos and three other passengers. | Success |
| NS-18 | 13 October 2021, 14:49 | 13 October 2021, 14:59 | (United States) Audrey Powers; (Australia) Chris Boshuizen; (United States) Glen de Vries; (Canada) William Shatner | 10 minutes, 17 seconds | Space tourism mission. Second crewed flight of New Shepard. Carried actor William Shatner and three other paying passengers. | Success |
| NS-19 | 11 December 2021, 15:00 | 11 December 2021, 15:10 | (United States) Laura Shepard Churchley; (United States) Michael Strahan; (United States) Dylan Taylor; (United States) Evan Dick; (United States) Lane Bess; (United States) Cameron Bess | 10 minutes, 13 seconds | Space tourism mission. Third crewed flight of New Shepard. First fully crewed New Shepard spaceflight. Carried Laura Shepard Churchley, the daughter of Alan Shepard, for whom the vehicle is named after, football player and Good Morning America host Michael Strahan, and four other paying passengers. | Success |
| NS-20 | 31 March 2022, 13:57 | 31 March 2022, 14:07 | (United States) Marty Allen; (United States) Sharon Hagle; (United States) Marc Hagle; (United States) Jim Kitchen; (United States) George Nield; (United States) Gary Lai | 10 minutes, 4 seconds | Space tourism mission. Fourth crewed flight of New Shepard. Comedian Pete Davidson was originally expected to be on board, but was unable to fly due to a launch date change. Davidson was replaced by New Shepard chief architect Gary Lai. Five other paying passengers were on board. | Success |
| NS-21 | 4 June 2022, 13:25 | 4 June 2022, 13:35 | (United States) Evan Dick; (United States) Katya Echazarreta; (United Kingdom) Hamish Harding; (Brazil) Victor Correa Hespanha; (United States) Jaison Robinson; (United States) Victor Vescovo | 10 minutes, 5 seconds | Space tourism mission. Fifth crewed flight of New Shepard. Crew included NS-19 crew member Evan Dick, and undersea explorer Victor Vescovo. | Success |
| NS-22 | 4 August 2022, 13:56 | 4 August 2022, 14:06 | (United States) Coby Cotton; (Portugal) Mário Ferreira; (United States) Vanessa O'Brian; (United States) Clint Kelly III; (Egypt) Sara Sabry; (United States) Steve Young | 10 minutes, 22 seconds | Space tourism mission. Sixth crewed flight of New Shepard. Crew included first Portuguese person and first Egyptian person in space. | Success |
| NS-25 | 19 May 2024, 14:35 | 19 May 2024, 14:45 | (United States) Kenneth Hess; (France) Sylvain Chiron; (United States) Mason Angel; (United States) Ed Dwight; (United States) Carol Schaller; (India) Gopi Thotakura | 9 minutes, 53 seconds | Space tourism mission. Seventh crewed flight of New Shepard. Crew included Ed Dwight, the oldest person to reach space. | Success |
| NS-26 | 29 August 2024, 13:07 | 29 August 2024, 13:17 | (United Kingdom) (Singapore) Nicolina Elrick; (United States) Rob Ferl; (Ukraine) Eugene Grin; (Iran) (United States) Eiman Jahangir; (United States) Karsen Kitchen; (United States) (Israel) Ephraim Rabin | 10 minutes, 8 seconds | Space tourism mission. Eight crewed flight of New Shepard. Crew included Karsen Kitchen, the youngest woman to cross the Kármán line (100 km) at 21 years old. | Success |
| NS-28 | 22 November 2024, 15:30 | 22 November 2024, 15:40 | (United States) Emily Calandrelli; (United States) Sharon Hagle (2); (United States) Marc Hagle (2); (United States) Austin Litteral; (United States) J. D. Russell; James (J.D.) Russell; (Canada) Henry (Hank) Wolfond | 10 minutes, 8 seconds | Space tourism mission. Ninth crewed flight of New Shepard. | Success |
| NS-30 | 25 February 2025, 15:49 | 25 February 2025, 15:59 | (United States) Lane Bess (2); (Spain) Jesús Calleja; (India) (United States) Tushar Shah; (United States) Dr. Richard Scott; (Australia) Elaine Chia Hyde; (Australia) Russell Wilson | 10 minutes, 8 seconds | Space tourism mission. Tenth crewed flight of New Shepard. | Success |
| NS-32 | 31 May 2025, 13:39 | 31 May 2025, 13:49 | (United States) Paul Jeris; (Canada) Jesse Williams; (Puerto Rico); Aymette (Amy) Medina Jorge; (United States) Dr. Gretchen Green; (Panama) Jaime Alemán; (New Zealand) Mark Rocket | 10 minutes, 7 seconds | Space tourism mission. 12th crewed flight of New Shepard. | Success |
| NS-34 | 3 August 2025, 12:42 | 3 August 2025, 12:52 | (United States) Arvinder (Arvi) Singh Bahal; (Turkey) Gökhan Erdem; (Puerto Rico) Deborah Martorell; (United Kingdom) Lionel Pitchford; (United States) James (J.D.) Russell; (Saint Kitts and Nevis) Justin Sun | 10 minutes, 14 seconds | Space tourism mission. 14th crewed flight of New Shepard. | Success |
| NS-36 | 8 October 2025, 13:40 | 8 October 2025, 13:50 | (United States) Clint Kelly III; (United States) Aaron Newman; (United States) Jeff Elgin; (Ukraine) Vitalii Ostrovsky; (Kazakhstan) Danna Karagussova; (United States) William H. Lewis | 10 minutes, 21 seconds | Space tourism mission. 15th crewed flight of New Shepard. | Success |
| NS-38 | 22 January 2026, 16:25 | 22 January 2026, 16:35 | Tim Drexler; Linda Edwards; Alain Fernandez; Alberto Gutiérrez; Jim Hendren; Laura Stiles | 10 minutes, 12 seconds | Space tourism mission. 17th crewed flight of New Shepard. | Success |
