= John Z. Kiss =

American space plant biologist

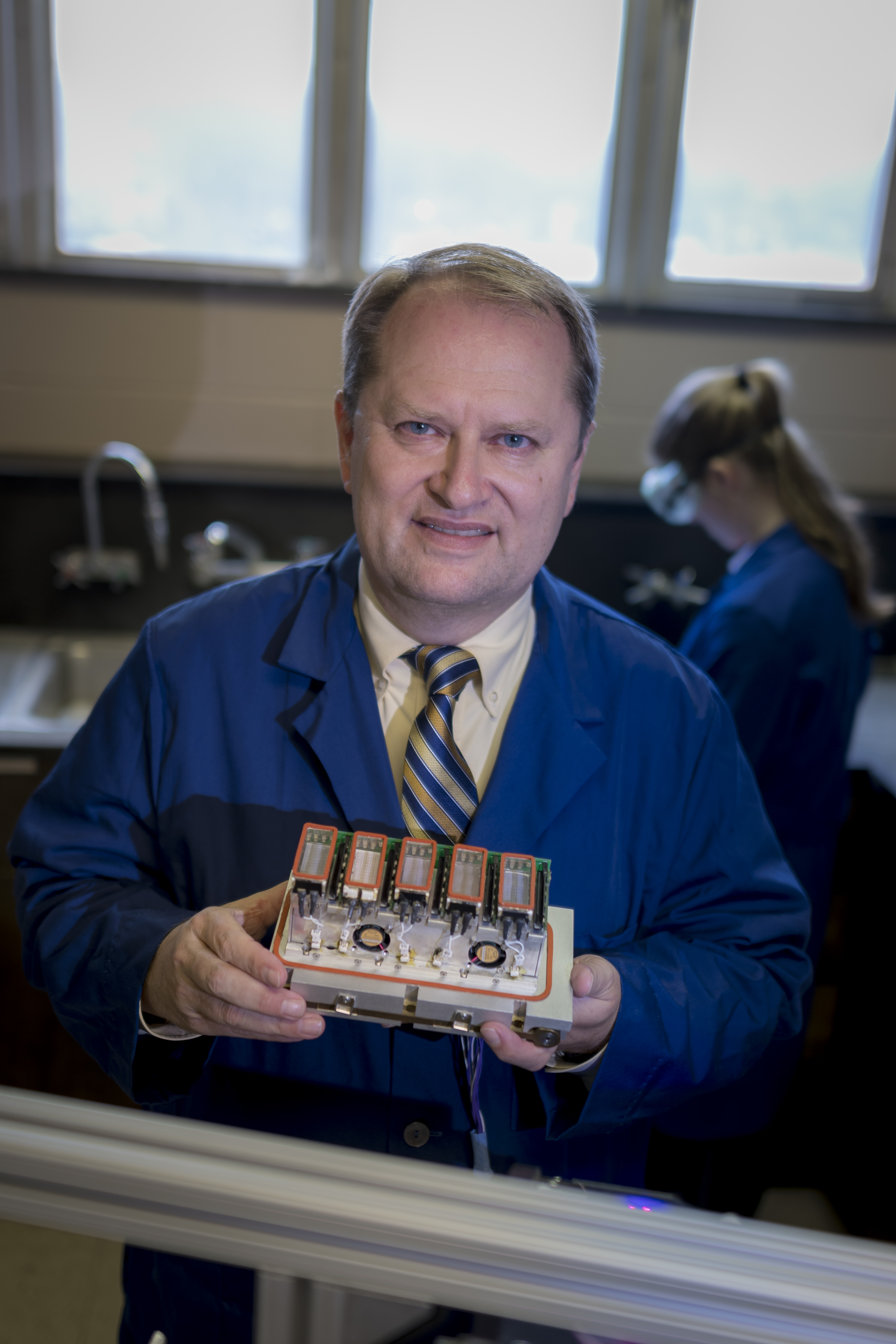
- Born: Kiss János Zoltán; 1960 (age 65–66); Szeged, Hungary
- Education: Georgetown University (BS); Rutgers University (PhD)
- Known for: Tropisms, botany, spaceflight research
- Spouse: Helen Kiss
- Awards: International Cooperation Medal, COSPAR (2021); Donald R. Kaplan Memorial Lecture Award, Botanical Society of America (2019); Founder’s Award, American Society for Gravitational & Space Research (2017); NASA Outstanding Public Leadership Medal (2014); Benjamin Harrison Medallion (2012)
- Scientific career
- Fields: Biology, botany, higher education
- Workplaces: Hofstra University; Miami University; University of Mississippi; UNC Greensboro; Florida Institute of Technology

John Z. Kiss (born 1960) is an American biologist known for his work on the gravitational and space biology of plants. Kiss is senior vice president for academic affairs and provost at the Florida Institute of Technology. Previously, he was dean of the College of Arts & Sciences at the University of North Carolina at Greensboro. He has also served as dean of the Graduate School at the University of Mississippi, and distinguished professor and chair of the botany department at Miami University. He has worked with NASA since 1987 and served as principal investigator on nine spaceflight experiments on the Space Shuttle, the former Russian space station Mir, and on the International Space Station. His research focuses on the sensory physiology of plants in space. He received the NASA Outstanding Public Leadership Medal in 2014. In 2021, Asteroid Kiss 8267 was named in his honor, a recognition that coincided with his receipt of the 2021 COSPAR International Cooperation Medal. His international collaboration on a spaceflight project with NASA and the European Space Agency has led to the discovery of novel sensory mechanisms in plants.

== Education ==
Kiss received his Bachelor of Science degree in biology from Georgetown University. and a Ph.D. in botany and plant physiology from Rutgers University in 1987. His doctoral work focused on biosynthesis of the storage carbohydrate paramylon in the alga Euglena. From 1987 to 1990 Kiss conducted post-doctoral work on gravitropism in plants at Ohio State University, where he was first introduced to NASA-related research. His first funded project, on gravity perception and response mechanisms, was as a NASA research associate at the University of Colorado at Boulder from 1990 to 1991.

== Personal life ==
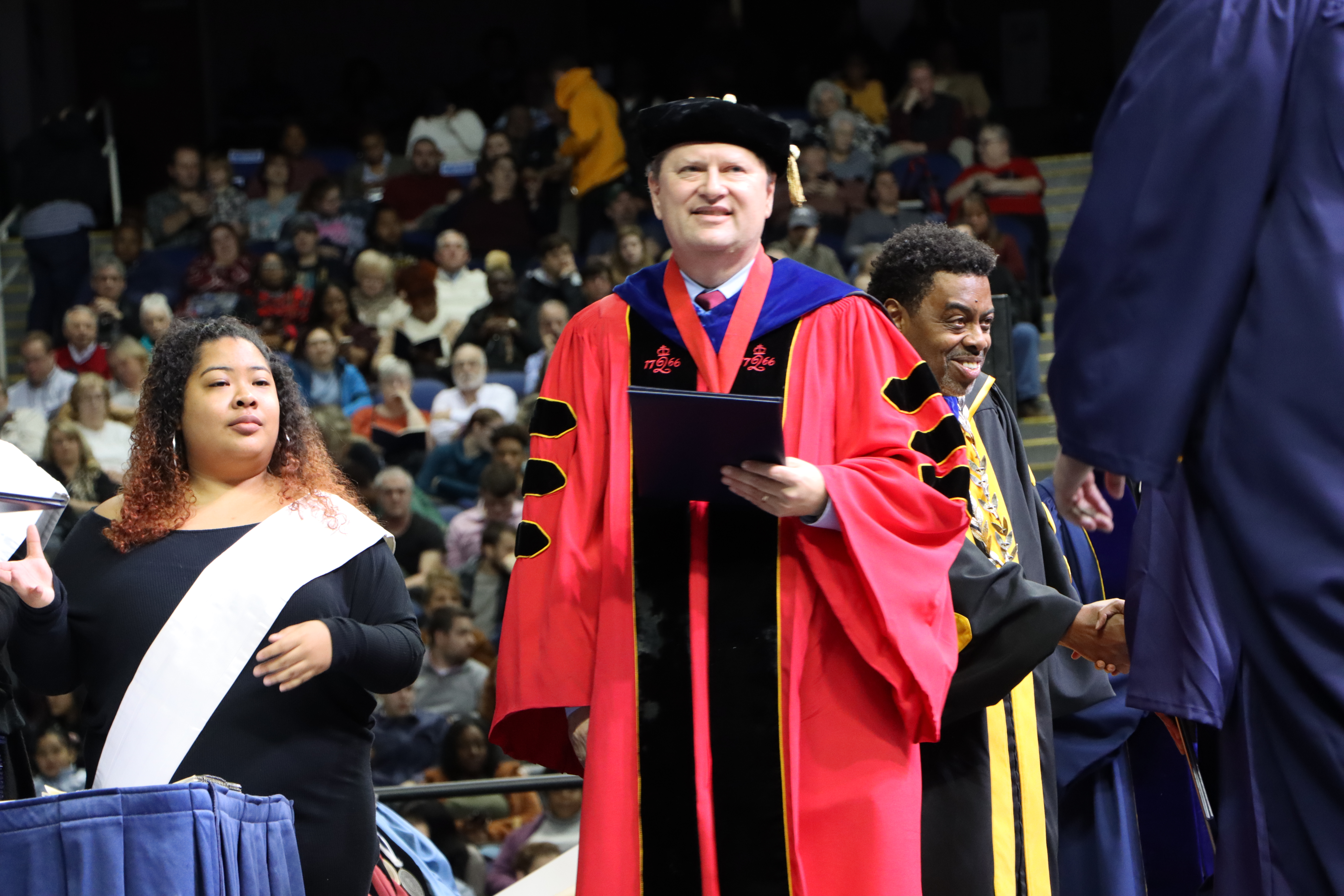
Dean Kiss at a UNC Greensboro commencement ceremony, 2019

Kiss is married to Helen Guiragossian Kiss, who also received her Ph.D. from Rutgers University and works in higher education research. They have one son, Stephen Vahe Kiss.

== Academic career ==
Kiss’ first tenure-track appointment was as an assistant professor at Hofstra University from 1991 to 1993. From 1993 to 2012, he worked at Miami University, becoming a University Distinguished Professor in 2011. The following year, Kiss received the Benjamin Harrison Medallion, the highest recognition by Miami University for “extraordinary contributions related to teaching, research, and service”. He has had faculty appointments as professor of biology at the University of Mississippi (2012–16) and the University of North Carolina Greensboro (2016–2024) and had an active research laboratory while serving as dean at both universities.

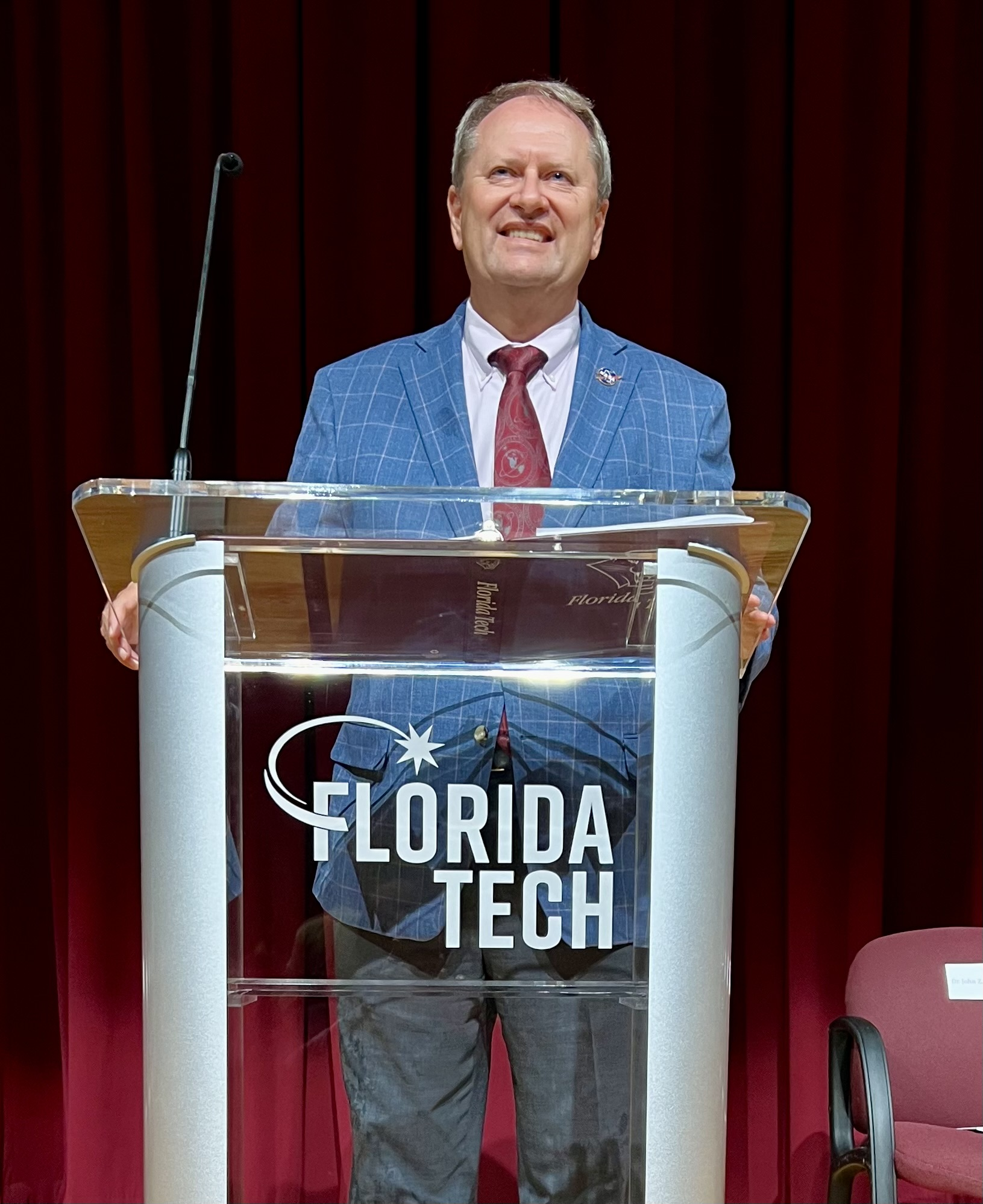
Kiss addresses university faculty at annual meeting in 2024.

His higher education leadership and academic research continues as provost and senior vice president of academic affairs at Florida Institute of Technology.

== Research ==
Kiss' research focuses on plants in space, specifically how gravity and light responses influence each other in plants. His work seeks to understand the cellular signaling mechanisms involved in plant tropisms—directed plant movement and growth in response to external stimuli. Early in his career, Kiss focused on the cellular mechanisms that mediate gravitropism. In addition, he is interested in how plants adapt to weightlessness and low-gravity environments, which is important for determining the ability of plants to provide a complete, sustainable, and dependable means for human life support in space.

Kiss was the principal investigator or co-investigator on nine spaceflight projects on the Space Shuttle, Mir, the International Space Station, and the Blue Origin New Shepard vehicle. His major collaborators on these space projects included Richard E. Edelmann from Miami University and F. Javier Medina from Centro de Investigaciones Biológicas (CSIC) in Spain. This spaceflight research contributed to the discovery of a novel red-light sensing mechanism involved in phototropism of flowering plants. Kiss also was one of the first scientists to study plant behavior at fractional or reduced gravity on the ISS. Kiss and his coworkers have contributed toward understanding the effects of microgravity/reduced gravity on transcription and gene expression in plants.

== Outreach ==
In 2019, Kiss gave a TEDx talk on the importance of plants for a human mission to Mars. In 2020, he was interviewed on the Interplanetary Podcast and the Orbital Mechanics Podcast to discuss his work as a plant space biologist. In 2025, Kiss was interviewed on the WMFE-FM Are We There Yet? podcast to discuss the Blue Origin experiment.

== Spaceflight missions ==
Summary of the spaceflight projects flown on vehicles in low Earth orbit with John Z. Kiss serving as the principal investigator or co-investigator:

Project Title	Year	Topic	Facility	Launched	Performed	Returned
PREPLASTID	1997	Gravity perception	Biorack-Spacehab	STS-81	STS-81	STS-81
PLASTID	1997	Gravity perception	Biorack-Spacehab	STS-84	STS-84	STS-84
TROPI-1	2006–07	Tropisms; microgravity	EMCS-ISS	STS-121, STS-115	Expedition 14	STS-116, STS-117, STS-120
TROPI-2	2010	Tropisms; reduced gravity	EMCS-ISS	STS-130	Expedition 22	STS-131
BRIC-16	2010	Plant morphology; gene profiling	BRIC-Space Shuttle Middeck	STS-130	STS-130	STS-130
Seedling Growth-1	2013–14	Phototropism; cell cycle; gene profiling	EMCS-ISS	SpX-2	Expedition 35	SpX-3
Seedling Growth-2	2014–15	Phototropism; cell cycle; gene profiling	EMCS-ISS	SpX-4	Expedition 41	SpX-5
Seedling Growth-3	2017	Phototropism; cell cycle; gene profiling; cell localization	EMCS-ISS	SpX-11	Expedition 52	SpX-11
Fluid Dynamics at Lunar Gravity (FD@LG)	2025	Fluid Dynamics	Blue Origin New Shepard	NS-29	NS-29	NS-29
