= RSS Kármán Line =

Blue Origin New Shepard capsule

- Type: Space capsule
- Class: New Shepard crew capsule
- Owner: Blue Origin
- Manufacturer: Blue Origin

Specifications
- Rocket: New Shepard

History
- Location: Van Horn, Texas
- First flight: 23 October 2024; Blue Origin NS-27
- Last flight: Active
- Flights: 4

New Shepard crew capsules

RSS Kármán Line (Reusable Space Ship Kármán Line) is a New Shepard space capsule, built and operated by American spaceflight company Blue Origin. It is the fourth New Shepard capsule to fly to space, and the second to fly passengers, after RSS First Step. The capsule's first uncrewed flight was the NS-27 mission on 23 October 2024, which was also the maiden flight of New Shepard booster NS5.

== History ==
RSS Kármán Line, the fourth New Shepard capsule, was built by Blue Origin to "better meet growing customer demand" for New Shepard flights. The spacecraft is named after the Kármán line, an altitude of 100 km (62 mi) and the conventional definition of the edge of space, which the capsule crosses at the apogee of its sub-orbital spaceflight, itself named after Hungarian-American mathematician, aerospace engineer and physicist Theodore von Kármán. The capsule first flew on the uncrewed NS-27 verification mission, which launched on 23 October 2024 carrying twelve customer payloads, after issues pushed back the launch from 7 October 2024.

The first crewed flight of the capsule was NS-31, which was the first all-female crew since Valentina Tereshkova's solo 1963 flight on Vostok 6.

== Flights ==
Mission	Launch date (UTC)	Landing date (UTC)	Crew	Duration	Remarks	Outcome
NS-27	23 October 2024	23 October 2024	Uncrewed	~10 minutes	Uncrewed test flight. Maiden flight of NS5 propulsion module.	Success
NS-31	14 April 2025	14 April 2025	(The Bahamas) Aisha Bowe, (United States) Amanda Nguyễn, (United States) Gayle King, (United States) Katy Perry, (United States) Kerianne Flynn, (United States) Lauren Sánchez	~10 minutes, 21 seconds	First crewed flight. First all female crew since Valentina Tereshkova in 1963.	Success
NS-33	29 June 2025, 14:40	29 June 2025, 14:50	(United States) Allie Kuehner, (United States) Carl Kuehner, (United States) Leland Larson, (United States) Freddie Rescigno Jr., (Nigeria) Owolabi Salis, (United States) James (Jim) Sitkin	10 minutes, 14 seconds	Space tourism mission. 13th crewed flight of New Shepard.	Success
NS-37	20 December 2025, 14:15	20 December 2025, 14:25	(Germany) Michaela "Michi" Benthaus, (United States) Joey Hyde, (Germany) (United States) Hans Koenigsmann, (United States) Neal Milch, (South Africa) Adonis Pouroulis, (United States) Jason Stansell	10 minutes, 26 seconds	Space tourism mission. 16th crewed flight of New Shepard.	Success
