= Blue Origin NS-35 =

2025 private uncrewed sub-orbital spaceflight

- Mission type: Sub-orbital human spaceflight
- Mission duration: 10 minutes, 14 seconds
- Apogee: 105 km (65 mi)

Spacecraft properties
- Spacecraft: RSS H.G. Wells
- Manufacturer: Blue Origin

Start of mission
- Launch date: September 18, 2025, 8:00 am CDT (13:00 UTC)
- Rocket: New Shepard (NS5)
- Launch site: Corn Ranch, LS-1
- Contractor: Blue Origin

End of mission
- Landing date: September 18, 2025, 8:10:14 am CDT (13:10:14 UTC)
- Landing site: Corn Ranch
- Origin NS-35 mission patch New Shepard flights

Blue Origin NS-35 was a sub-orbital cargo spaceflight mission, operated by Blue Origin which launched on September 18, 2025, using the New Shepard rocket.

The mission carried over forty payloads from NASA, commercial companies, and research institutions such as the University of Florida, Carthage College, Teledyne, and the NASA TechRise Student Challenge. It was the 12th and final mission for the RSS H.G. Wells Crew Capsule.
