= J. D. Russell =

American entrepreneur and police officer

James "J.D." Russell is an American entrepreneur, spaceflight participant, and former law enforcement officer. He founded a community management software company InfoHOA in 2018 and launched Alpha Funds, a venture capital platform focused on aerospace and frontier technologies in 2025. In November 2024, he flew aboard Blue Origin’s New Shepard NS-28 mission, becoming one of the first retired U.S. police officers to reach space and the 670th person to cross the Karman Line on the List of Space Travelers by First Flight. He flew a second mission in August 2025 on Blue Origin NS-34.

== Early life and education ==
Russell was born at Davis–Monthan Air Force Base in Tucson, Arizona. As a teenager, he grew up in St. Mary's County, Maryland, and joined the Civil Air Patrol and earned the General Billy Mitchell Award.

== Career ==
During college, Russell entered law enforcement, serving first as a police officer in Maryland, and then as a federal Marine, Fish and Wildlife law enforcement game warden responsible for resource protection patrols.

Leaving police work, he moved into property services entrepreneurship. By 2015, he founded HPS and began acquiring management companies throughout the United States. In 2017 founded InfoHOA, a software-centered homeowners'-association management firm. In 2025 he had fully exited both firms.

Blue Origin announced on November 15, 2024 that Russell would join five crewmates on mission NS-28 aboard the RSS First Steps for the 8th human flight of the New Shepard Program. The flight also included Emily Dawn Calandrelli. The vehicle lifted off from West Texas at Launch Site One, also known as Corn Ranch, on November 22, 2024 and, after crossing the Kármán line (about 100 km). The flight made Russell the 670th person to enter space on the List of Space Travelers by First Flight.

On August 3, 2025 Russell completed a second New Shepard mission with Blue Origin on NS-34 aboard the RSS First Steps for the 14th human flight of the New Sheppard Program. The crew included crypto pioneer and TRON founder Justin Sun. The mission was named "OneEarth" and included an internationally diverse crew with members for Hong Kong, India, Puerto Rico, Turkey, the United Kingdom, and Russell from the United States.

Drawing on his space flight profile, Russell launched Alpha Funds in June 2025. The venture capital vehicle has announced a flagship project, Alpha Aerospace, aimed at early-stage propulsion and advanced manufacturing startups.

Russell regularly speaks at various space related events including the Silicon Valley Space Week, MilSat Symposium, and the Latin American Business Council Russell also serves on the Reuters Space Advisory Board.

== Philanthropy ==
Russell founded the Victoria Russell Foundation, named for his late daughter, to promote children's literacy and to support families of first responders. The nonprofit partners with Dolly Parton's Imagination Library to distribute free books to children under five. The foundation currently supports two libraries, the Imagination Library of Harford County and the Imagination Library of St. Mary's County.

Russell also serves as a board member and treasurer for Space for Humanity, a Citizen Space Agency, founded by Voyager Technologies founder and CEO Dylan Taylor, that has sent seven private citizen astronauts into space, including nobel prize lariat nominee Amanda Nguyen.

== Awards ==
- Gen. Billy Mitchell Award (Civil Air Patrol cadet honor).
