= Blue Origin NS-17 =

2021 American uncrewed sub-orbital spaceflight

- Mission type: Sub-orbital spaceflight
- Mission duration: 10 minutes, 15 seconds
- Apogee: 105.9 km (65.8 mi)

Spacecraft properties
- Spacecraft: RSS H. G. Wells
- Manufacturer: Blue Origin

Start of mission
- Launch date: 26 August 2021, 9:31 am CDT (14:31 UTC)
- Rocket: New Shepard (NS3)
- Launch site: Corn Ranch, LS-1
- Contractor: Blue Origin

End of mission
- Landing date: 26 August 2021, 9:41:15 am CDT (14:41:15 UTC)
- Landing site: Corn Ranch
- Blue Origin NS-17 mission patch New Shepard flights

Blue Origin NS-17 was an sub-orbital spaceflight cargo mission of Blue Origin's New Shepard rocket, which launched on 26 August 2021. It was New Shepards 4th flight in 2021. It was also Blue Origin's 17th overall flight to go into space.

== Flight ==
The vehicle lifted off at 14:31 UTC on 26 August 2021, from Launch Site 1 (LS-1) at Blue Origins' Corn Ranch launch site in Texas, United States. Main Engine Cutoff (MECO) occurred at T+2 minutes 24 seconds into the flight. At T+2:43, the capsule separated from the booster, at which point it began to experience Zero G, until T+5:33, giving the payloads 2 minutes and 50 seconds of uninterrupted Zero G. RSS H. G. Wells passed the Karman Line at T+3 minutes 30 seconds after launch, until T+4:39, spending a total of 1 minute, 9 seconds in space. The capsule reached apogee at T+4:06, reaching an altitude of 347,430 feet (105,896 meters), while the booster reached an apogee of 347,032 feet (105,775 meters). The booster deployed its ring and wedge fins during descent, before reigniting its single BE-3 engine, coming to a near-hover and touching down at T+7 minutes 27 seconds into the flight on Blue Origin's North Landing Pad, ~3.3 km (~2 miles) away from the launch site. At 09:41:15 CDT (14:41:15 UTC) the capsule landed at the Corn Ranch site, 10 minutes, 15 seconds after liftoff. The booster supporting this mission was New Shepard Booster 3 (NS3), a booster specifically dedicated to cargo missions. This was its 8th total flight with a 317-day turnaround time, it was paired with the RSS H. G. Wells capsule on top for this flight.

== Payload ==
There were 20 payloads on this mission, from NASA and commercial companies. These included a NASA lunar landing technology demonstration, which was placed on the exterior of the booster, 18 commercial payloads inside the capsule, of which 11 were supported by NASA, and an art installation on the exterior of the capsule. The capsule also carried thousands of postcards from the "Postcards to Space" program, run by the Club for the Future organization, a Blue Origin nonprofit.

Payload	Operator	Description
The Model Propellant Gauging Experiment	Carthage College	Tests a new approach to measuring propellant levels in spacecraft in the environment of space.
OSCAR	NASA Kennedy Space Center	Tests how common spaceflight waste products can be reused.
Liquid Acquisition Device (LAD-3)	Southwest Research Institute	Demonstrates how liquid/vapor interfaces behave in microgravity. Applications include cryogenic propellant storage and management.
Biological Imaging in Support of Suborbital Science	University of Florida	Tests an improved version of the BISS system, including autofocus and improved resolution.
Safe and Precise Landing Integrated Capabilities Evolution (SPLICE) (aka Deorbit, Descent and Landing "DDL" Sensor Demonstration)	NASA	Tests precision landing capabilities for future moon landings. On this flight, a camera and a Doppler LIDAR, along with a high-performance computer were tested. Previously flown on Blue Origin NS-13.
