= Laura Stiles =

American aerospace engineer (born 1986)

- Born: Laura Ann Stiles; April 14, 1986 (age 40); Prairie Village, Kansas
- Occupation: Aerospace engineer
- Known for: Blue Origin NS-38

Academic background
- Education: University of Kansas (BS); University of Colorado, Boulder (MS, PhD)
- Thesis: Electrostatic inflation of membrane space structures (2013)
- Doctoral advisor: Hanspeter Schaub

Academic work
- Institutions: Blue Origin
- Main interests: Human spaceflight
- Space career

Commercial Astronaut
- Time in space: 10 minutes 12 seconds
- Mission: Blue Origin NS-38

Laura Ann Stiles (born April 14, 1986) is an American aerospace engineer. She was the director of New Shepard flight operations and astronaut training at Blue Origin until 2026.

== Biography ==
Stiles was born in Prairie Village, Kansas in 1986 to Brenda and Mark Stiles. She studied engineering physics at the University of Kansas, doing research under Michael Murray and Alice Bean. As an undergraduate, she worked on the formation flying dynamics of the New Worlds Observer telescope at NASA Goddard Space Flight Center in 2007. She also worked at CERN's Large Hadron Collider, designing the light injection system on the Zero Degree Calorimeter for the Compact Muon Solenoid (CMS) experiment. Stiles graduated in 2008.

She attended the University of Colorado, Boulder and studied aerospace engineering, astrodynamics, and satellite navigation. As a graduate student, she worked on CubeSat deployable reflectors at the Air Force Research Laboratory in 2009. Under Hanspeter Schaub, she researched electrostatic inflation of space stations, graduating with a master's in 2011 and doctorate in 2013.

In 2013, Stiles joined American private aerospace company Blue Origin. Initially an engineer on the New Shepard capsule parachute system, she became the lead for New Shepard launch operations in 2018. She served as a flight controller for more than twelve sub-orbital launches. In April 2022, Stiles became crew member 7 for New Shepard.

On January 21, 2026, Stiles flew to an altitude of 107 km on New Shepard 4 as a crew member on Blue Origin NS-38. She became the twenty-first person from the University of Colorado to fly to space beyond the Kármán line.

== Personal life ==
Stiles has been a skydiving instructor since 2011. She competed nationally and holds 2 World Records in large-formation flying. She holds a patent for the design of a deployable shell with wrapped gores.

== See also ==
- Hanspeter Schaub
- Blue Origin
- List of astronauts educated at the University of Colorado Boulder
