= Blue Origin NS-26 =

2024 private crewed sub-orbital spaceflight

- Mission type: Sub-orbital human spaceflight
- Mission duration: 10 minutes, 8 seconds
- Apogee: 105 km (65 mi)

Spacecraft properties
- Spacecraft: RSS First Step
- Manufacturer: Blue Origin

Crew
- Crew size: 6
- Members: Ephraim Rabin; Nicolina Elrick; Eugene Grin; Rob Ferl; Karsen Kitchen; Eiman Jahangir

Start of mission
- Launch date: August 29, 2024, 8:07:03 am CDT (13:07:03 UTC)
- Rocket: New Shepard (NS4)
- Launch site: Corn Ranch, LS-1
- Contractor: Blue Origin

End of mission
- Landing date: August 29, 2024, 8:17:11 am CDT (13:17:11 UTC)
- Landing site: Corn Ranch
- Blue Origin NS-26 mission patch New Shepard flights

Blue Origin NS-26 was a sub-orbital spaceflight mission, operated by Blue Origin, launched on August 29, 2024, using the New Shepard rocket.

== Passengers ==
Position	Passenger
Tourist	(United States) (Israel) Ephraim Rabin; First spaceflight
Tourist	(United Kingdom) (Singapore) Nicolina Elrick; First spaceflight
Tourist	(Ukraine) Eugene Grin; First spaceflight
Scientist	(United States) Rob Ferl; First spaceflight
Tourist	(United States) Karsen Kitchen; First spaceflight
Tourist	(Iran) (United States) Eiman Jahangir; First spaceflight

=== Details ===
The flight's passengers included NASA-funded scientist Rob Ferl who is a professor at the University of Florida. During the flight, he performed experiments studying the change of gene expression in one type of plant when the plant was exposed to microgravity and other different phases of flight. Professor Ferl was the first NASA-funded researcher flying aboard New Shepard (or indeed aboard any of the commercial suborbital space vehicles of the 21st century). His flight and experiments were funded by NASA's Flight Opportunities program.

Nicolina Elrick is an entrepreneur. She is a British citizen from Scotland and also a permanent resident of Singapore, and intends to become a Singapore citizen.

Eiman Jahangir's flight was sponsored by the cryptocurrency spaceflight accelerator organization MoonDAO. Before and after his flight he participated in two science research studies: Vanderbilt’s Clonal Hematopoiesis and Inflammation in the Vasculature (CHIVE) registry and biorepository, and the Space Omics and Medical Atlas (SOMA) study at Cornell University.

Karsen Kitchen became the youngest woman and youngest American to cross the Kármán line (100 km) at 21 years old. Anastatia Mayers was at the time the youngest woman to fly to space (above 50 miles altitude, US definition of space) and remained so after Karsen Kitchen's flight.
