= Blue Origin NS-27 =

2024 private uncrewed sub-orbital spaceflight

- Mission type: Sub-orbital human spaceflight
- Mission duration: 10 minutes, 4 seconds
- Apogee: 101 km (63 mi)

Spacecraft properties
- Spacecraft: RSS Kármán Line
- Manufacturer: Blue Origin

Start of mission
- Launch date: October 23, 2024, 10:26:02 am CDT (15:26:02 UTC)
- Rocket: New Shepard (NS5)
- Launch site: Corn Ranch, LS-1
- Contractor: Blue Origin

End of mission
- Landing date: October 23, 2024, 10:36:06 am CDT (15:36:06 UTC)
- Landing site: Corn Ranch
- Blue Origin NS-27 mission patch New Shepard flights

Blue Origin NS-27 was a sub-orbital cargo spaceflight mission, operated by Blue Origin, launched on October 23, 2024 using the New Shepard rocket. Previously, an October 7 launch attempt was called off after rocket issues and a subsequent attempt on October 13 foiled by a GPS issue.

== Details ==
The mission debuted the second human-rated New Shepard capsule, RSS Kármán Line and a new booster, NS5. Twelve payloads were flown, including two LIDAR sensors for Blue Origin's Lunar Permanence program and a reproduction of the black monolith from 2001: A Space Odyssey. Five payloads were on the booster and seven inside the capsule.
