= Blue Origin Goddard =

Rocket

Blue Origin Goddard is the name of the first development vehicle in Blue Origin's New Shepard program, which flew for the first time on November 13, 2006. Named after rocketry pioneer Robert H. Goddard, the vehicle is a subscale demonstrator and flew up to a height of about 85 m (279 ft) during its initial flight. The private spacecraft venture is being funded by the billionaire founder Jeff Bezos.

== Overview ==
The Goddard rocket used 9 BE-1 engines, and is a single stage sub-orbital test vehicle. A video, filmed on November 13, 2006, from the Corn Ranch spaceport shows the first craft to launch under the New Shepard program. The vehicle climbed for approximately 10 seconds, reaching a height of roughly 85 m (279 ft) before starting to descend, and making a controlled landing back on its landing legs approximately 25 seconds after take-off.

This flight marked the first time the company's founder, Jeff Bezos, broke his silence on the work of the space company. On the company's website, Bezos said: "We're working, patiently and step-by-step, to lower the cost of spaceflight [...] Accomplishing this mission will take a long time, and we're working on it methodically." Bezos founded Blue Origin in 2000 with the intention of developing a vertical take-off and landing vehicle, able to carry passengers to the edge of space. This would eventually come in the form of the New Shepard rocket, which made its debut flight in 2015. Then on July 20, 2021, New Shepard flew its first crewed flight which included Bezos as one of the crew members.

The vehicle made three flights. The second flight took place on March 22, 2007, and its third and final flight on April 19, 2007.

== See also ==
- CORONA
- Kankoh-maru
- Lunar Lander Challenge
- Project VR-190
- Project Morpheus NASA program to continue developing ALHAT and Q landers
- Reusable Vehicle Testing program by JAXA
- SpaceShipTwo
- SpaceX reusable launch system development program
- XCOR Lynx
- Zarya
