= Blue Origin NS-36 =

2025 sub-orbital human spaceflight

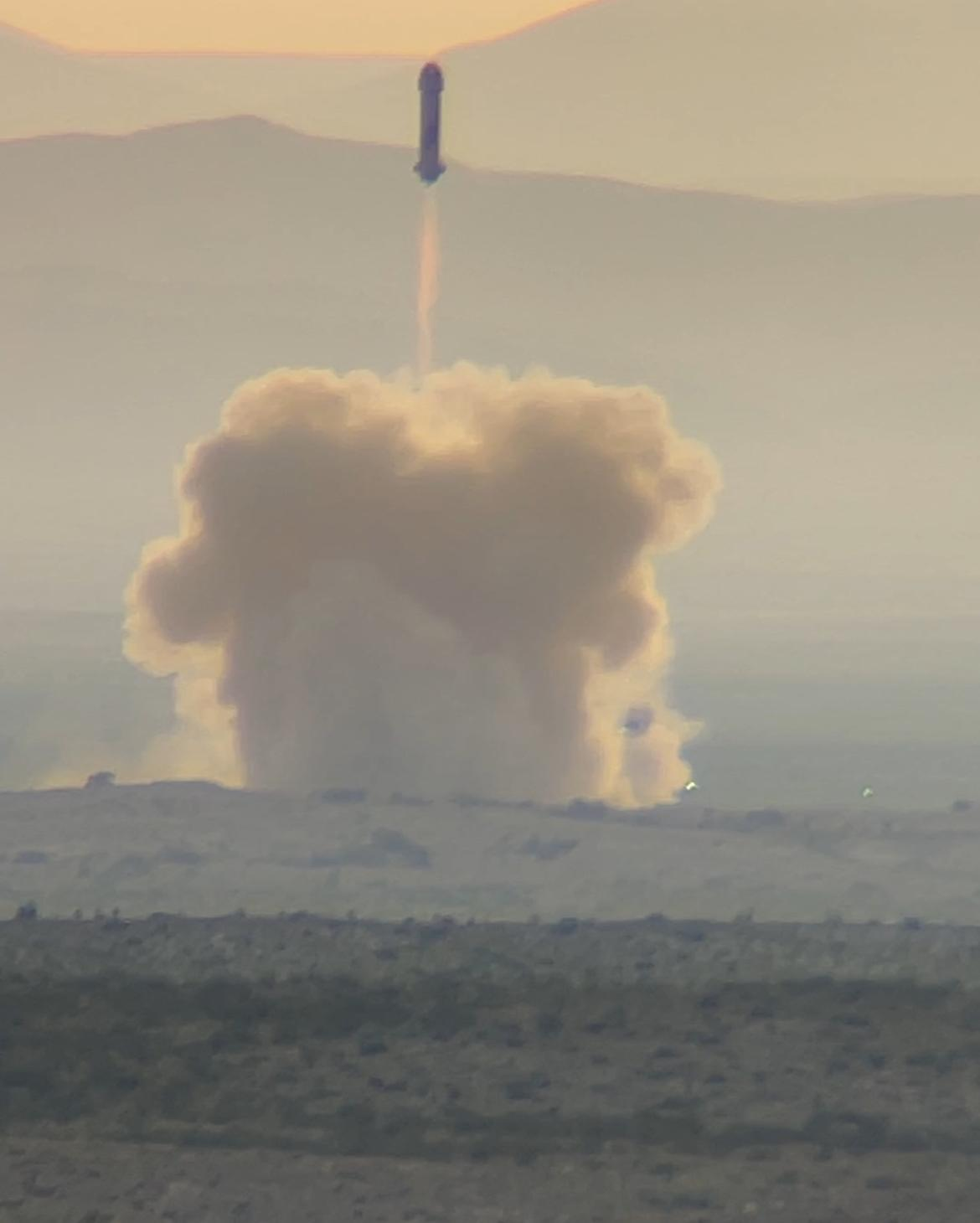
- Launch of NS-36
- Mission type: Sub-orbital human spaceflight
- Mission duration: 10 minutes, 21 seconds
- Apogee: 107 km (66 mi)

Spacecraft properties
- Spacecraft: RSS First Step
- Manufacturer: Blue Origin

Crew
- Crew size: 6
- Members: Jeff Elgin; Danna Karagussova; Clint Kelly III; Aaron Charles Newman; Vitalii Ostrovsky; William H. Lewis

Start of mission
- Launch date: October 8, 2025, 13:40:27 UTC
- Rocket: New Shepard (NS4)
- Launch site: Corn Ranch, LS‑1
- Contractor: Blue Origin

End of mission
- Landing date: October 8, 2025, 13:50:48 UTC
- Landing site: Corn Ranch
- Blue Origin NS-36 mission patch New Shepard flights

Blue Origin NS‑36 was a sub-orbital spaceflight operated by Blue Origin as part of its New Shepard space tourism program. The flight launched from Launch Site One (Corn Ranch) in West Texas on October 8, 2025, at 13:40 UTC (09:40 a.m. Eastern). The launch window opened at about 8:30 AM CDT (13:30 UTC).

This mission represents the 15th human flight and the 36th overall flight of the New Shepard program.

== Passengers ==
The flight's passengers include an executive in the franchise industry Jeff Elgin, an entrepreneur with experience in media, distribution, and events Danna Karagussova, an electrical engineer with a Bachelor of Science from Duke University and a PhD from the University of Michigan, who led government and industry R&D in computer science and robotics Clint Kelly III (Second Flight to Space, First in NS-22), a serial entrepreneur and explorer Aaron C. Newman, a Ukrainian businessman, hotel and real estate investor, systems analyst, web developer, relentless globetrotter Vitalii Ostrovsky, and William Lewis, who asked to remain anonymous until after the flight.

Position	Passenger
Tourist / Research Subject	(United States) Aaron Newman; First spaceflight
Tourist	(United States) Jeff Elgin; First spaceflight
Tourist	(United States) Clint Kelly III; Second spaceflight
Tourist	(Ukraine) Vitalii Ostrovsky; First spaceflight
Tourist	(Kazakhstan) Danna Karagussova; First spaceflight
Tourist	(United States) William H. Lewis; First spaceflight

== Science ==
In collaboration with Utah State University led by PI Chris Dakin, Ph.D., Aaron Newman took part in a study focused on human adaptation to spaceflight, with an emphasis on vestibular function and motion sickness.
