= Blue Origin NS-34 =

2025 sub-orbital human spaceflight

- Mission type: Sub-orbital human spaceflight
- Mission duration: 10 minutes, 12 seconds
- Apogee: 105 km (65 mi)

Spacecraft properties
- Spacecraft: RSS First Step
- Manufacturer: Blue Origin

Crew
- Crew size: 6
- Members: Arvinder (Arvi) Singh Bahal; Gökhan Erdem; Deborah Martorell; Lionel Pitchford; James (J.D.) Russell; Justin Sun

Start of mission
- Launch date: August 3, 2025, 12:42:16 UTC
- Rocket: New Shepard (NS4)
- Launch site: Corn Ranch, LS‑1
- Contractor: Blue Origin

End of mission
- Landing date: August 3, 2025, 12:52 UTC
- Landing site: Corn Ranch
- Blue Origin NS-34 mission patch New Shepard flights

Blue Origin NS‑34 was a sub-orbital spaceflight operated by Blue Origin as part of its New Shepard space tourism program. The flight launched from Launch Site One (Corn Ranch) in West Texas on August 3, 2025, at 12:42 UTC (08:42 a.m. Eastern). The launch window opened at about 7:30 AM CDT (12:30 UTC).

This mission represents the 14th human flight and the 34th overall flight of the New Shepard program.

== Passengers ==
The flight's passengers include world traveler and real estate investor Arvinder (Arvi) Singh Bahal, Turkish entrepreneur and photographer Gökhan Erdem, Emmy-winning meteorologist Deborah Martorell, humanitarian educator Lionel Pitchford, entrepreneur and returning space tourist James (J.D.) Russell, and crypto pioneer and TRON founder Justin Sun.

Position	Passenger
Tourist	(United States) J. D. Russell; Second spaceflight
Tourist	(United Kingdom) Lionel Pitchford; First spaceflight
Tourist	(Turkey) Gökhan Erdem; First spaceflight
Tourist	(Saint Kitts and Nevis) Justin Sun; First spaceflight
Tourist	(United States) Arvinder (Arvi) Singh Bahal; First spaceflight
Tourist	(Puerto Rico) Deborah Martorell; First spaceflight
