= Blue Origin NS-28 =

2024 private crewed sub-orbital spaceflight

- Mission type: Sub-orbital human spaceflight
- Mission duration: 10 minutes, 14 seconds
- Apogee: 107 km (66 mi)

Spacecraft properties
- Spacecraft: RSS First Step
- Manufacturer: Blue Origin

Crew
- Crew size: 6
- Members: Emily Calandrelli; Sharon Hagle; Marc Hagle; Austin Litteral; James Russell; Henry Wolfond

Start of mission
- Launch date: November 22, 2024, 9:30 am CST (15:30 UTC)
- Rocket: New Shepard (NS4)
- Launch site: Corn Ranch, LS-1
- Contractor: Blue Origin

End of mission
- Landing date: November 22, 2024, 9:40:14 am CST (15:40:14 UTC)
- Landing site: Corn Ranch
- Blue Origin NS-28 mission patch New Shepard flights

Blue Origin NS-28 was a sub-orbital spaceflight mission, operated by Blue Origin, which launched on November 22, 2024, using the New Shepard rocket.

== Passengers ==
Position	Passenger
Tourist	(United States) Austin Litteral; First spaceflight
Tourist	(United States) Marc Hagle; Second spaceflight
Tourist	(United States) Sharon Hagle; Second spaceflight
Tourist	(Canada) Henry Wolfond; First spaceflight
Tourist	(United States) J. D. Russell; First spaceflight
Tourist	(United States) Emily Calandrelli; First spaceflight

=== Details ===
The flight's passengers include Emily Calandrelli, a science communicator and host of Emily's Wonder Lab, Marc and Sharon Hagle, who were flying on their second New Shepard flight (the first being NS-20), Austin Litteral, who won his seat as part of a giveaway, James (J.D.) Russell and Henry (Hank) Wolfond.
