= Blue Origin NS-38 =

2026 sub-orbital human spaceflight

- Mission type: Sub-orbital human spaceflight
- Mission duration: 10 minutes, 12 seconds
- Apogee: 106 km (66 mi)

Spacecraft properties
- Spacecraft: RSS First Step
- Manufacturer: Blue Origin

Crew
- Crew size: 6
- Members: Tim Drexler; Linda Edwards; Alain Fernandez; Alberto Gutiérrez; Jim Hendren; Laura Stiles

Start of mission
- Launch date: 21 January 2026, 16:25:35 UTC
- Rocket: New Shepard (NS4)
- Launch site: Corn Ranch, West Texas
- Contractor: Blue Origin

End of mission
- Landing date: 21 January 2026, 16:35:47 UTC
- Landing site: Corn Ranch
- Blue Origin NS-38 mission patch New Shepard flights

Blue Origin NS-38 was a sub-orbital spaceflight operated by Blue Origin as part of its New Shepard space tourism program. The mission launched from Launch Site One in West Texas on January 21, 2026, with the exact liftoff time determined by the launch window. The live webcast began roughly 40 minutes before launch. The flight was expected to last approximately 10–12 minutes, carrying six passengers to an apogee above the Kármán line, the internationally recognized boundary of space.

The crew includes aerospace engineer Laura Stiles, who is director of New Shepard flight operations and astronaut training, business executive Tim Drexler, gynecologist Linda Edwards, real estate developer Alain Fernandez, traveler Alberto Gutiérrez, and Arkansas senator and retired F-15 pilot Col Jim Hendren.

The patch was released two days before the flight and features an F-15, symbolizing Hendren's F-15 Eagle, two Diamond DA42s, symbolizing Gutiérrez's and Drexler's love of flying, people in the windows to symbolize the crew, the Kármán line to represent Drexler's ambition for space, a beacon of light to represent Fernandez's motto, and a stethoscope and female gender symbol to represent Edwards's medical career.

NS-38 was the last flight before Blue Origin announced a two-year pause in New Shepard flights.

== Crew ==
| Position | Passenger |
|---|---|
| Tourist | (United States) Jim Hendren; First spaceflight |
| Tourist | (United States) Tim Drexler; First spaceflight |
| Tourist | (United States) Linda Edwards; First spaceflight |
| Tourist | (Spain) Alberto Gutiérrez; First spaceflight |
| Tourist | (France) Alain Fernandez; First spaceflight |
| Tourist | (United States) Laura Stiles; First spaceflight |
