= Blue Origin NS-29 =

2025 private uncrewed sub-orbital spaceflight

- Mission type: Sub-orbital human spaceflight
- Mission duration: 10 minutes, 6 seconds
- Apogee: 105 km (65 mi)

Spacecraft properties
- Spacecraft: RSS H.G. Wells
- Manufacturer: Blue Origin

Start of mission
- Launch date: February 4, 2025, 10:00 am CST (16:00 UTC)
- Rocket: New Shepard (NS5)
- Launch site: Corn Ranch, LS-1
- Contractor: Blue Origin

End of mission
- Landing date: February 4, 2025, 10:10:06 am CST (16:10:06 UTC)
- Landing site: Corn Ranch
- Blue Origin NS-29 mission patch New Shepard flights

Blue Origin NS-29 was a sub-orbital cargo spaceflight mission, operated by Blue Origin which launched on February 4, 2025 using the New Shepard rocket. The first launch attempt on January 28, 2025 scrubbed due to inclement weather and an avionics issue on the booster.

The mission aimed to simulate lunar gravity on behalf of NASA, by inducing artificial gravity through spinning the New Shepard capsule at 11 rpm using the spacecraft's reaction control system. The mission carried thirty payloads, provided by institutions such as Purdue University, Honeybee Robotics, Jet Propulsion Laboratory and Glenn Research Center, which investigated phenomena such as fluid management, combustion and formation of bubbles under lunar gravity.
