= Blue Origin NS-24 =

2023 American uncrewed sub-orbital spaceflight

- Mission type: Sub-orbital spaceflight
- Mission duration: 10 minutes, 13 seconds
- Apogee: 107 km (66 mi)

Spacecraft properties
- Spacecraft: RSS H. G. Wells
- Manufacturer: Blue Origin

Start of mission
- Launch date: December 19, 2023, 10:42:28 am CST (16:42:28 UTC)
- Rocket: New Shepard (NS4)
- Launch site: Corn Ranch, LS-1
- Contractor: Blue Origin

End of mission
- Landing date: December 19, 2023, 10:52:41 am CST (16:52:41 UTC)
- Landing site: Corn Ranch
- Blue Origin NS-24 mission patch New Shepard flights

Blue Origin NS-24 was a sub-orbital cargo spaceflight mission of Blue Origin's New Shepard rocket, which launched on December 19, 2023. It was New Shepard's first flight in over a year since the failure of Blue Origin NS-23.

== Flight ==
The vehicle lifted off at 16:42:28 UTC on December 19, 2023, from LS-1 at Blue Origin's Corn Ranch launch site in Texas, United States. There were no issues during the flight, like there were on Blue Origin NS-23. Main Engine Cutoff (MECO) occurred at T+02:25. The capsule reached apogee at T+04:07, reaching an altitude of 351,247 feet (107,060 meters), while the booster reached an apogee of 350,855 feet (106,940 meters). The booster touched down successfully at T+07:27 on the North Landing Pad. At 10:52:41 am CST (16:52:41 UTC), the capsule landed at the Corn Ranch site, 10 minutes and 13 seconds after liftoff. The booster supporting this mission was New Shepard Booster 4 (NS4), and this was its 9th total flight with a 502-day turnaround time, while the capsule on top was the RSS H. G. Wells.

== Payload ==
There were 33 payloads on this mission from NASA, academia, research institutions and commercial companies. This flight brought the total number of payloads flown on the New Shepard vehicle to 150. There were also 38,000 postcards from students across the world, provided by the Club for the Future organization, a Blue Origin nonprofit, as part of its "Postcards to Space" program. According to Blue Origin, more than half the payloads on NS-24 were developed and flown with support from NASA. One of the payloads flown was a prototype of the EagleCam CubeSat that flew on the IM-1 mission to the Moon.
