= Blue Origin NS-32 =

2025 sub-orbital human spaceflight

- Mission type: Sub-orbital human spaceflight
- Mission duration: 10 minutes, 7 seconds
- Apogee: 104 km (65 mi)

Spacecraft properties
- Spacecraft: RSS First Step
- Manufacturer: Blue Origin

Crew
- Crew size: 6
- Members: Aymette Medina Jorge; Gretchen Green; Jaime Alemán; Jesse Williams; Mark Rocket; Paul Jeris

Start of mission
- Launch date: May 31, 2025, 13:39:11 UTC (8:39 am CDT)
- Rocket: New Shepard (NS4)
- Launch site: Corn Ranch, LS-1
- Contractor: Blue Origin

End of mission
- Landing date: May 31, 2025, 13:49:18 UTC (8:49 am CDT)
- Landing site: Corn Ranch
- Blue Origin NS-32 mission patch New Shepard flights

Blue Origin NS-32 was a sub-orbital spaceflight operated by Blue Origin as part of its New Shepard space tourism program. The flight took place on May 31, 2025, launching from Launch Site One in West Texas at 8:39 am CDT (13:39:11 UTC). The mission lasted 10 minutes and 7 seconds, carrying six passengers to an apogee of about 104 km (65 mi), crossing the Kármán line, the FAI-recognized boundary of space.

This mission marked the 12th human flight and the 32nd overall flight for the New Shepard program.

== Passengers ==
The flight included K-12 STEM teacher Aymette Medina Jorge, radiologist Dr. Gretchen Green, former Panamanian ambassador Jaime Alemán, businessman Jesse Williams, aerospace executive Mark Rocket, and entrepreneur Paul Jeris.

Position	Passenger
Tourist	(United States) Gretchen Green; First spaceflight
Tourist	(United States) Paul Jeris; First spaceflight
Tourist	(Canada) Jesse Williams; First spaceflight
Tourist	(Panama) Jaime Alemán; First spaceflight
Tourist	(Puerto Rico) Amy Medina Jorge; First spaceflight
Tourist	(New Zealand) Mark Rocket; First spaceflight

== Mission ==
The NS-32 mission was part of Blue Origin's New Shepard space tourism program, which uses a remotely piloted rocket to propel a crew capsule into sub-orbital space. The flight launched from Launch Site One southeast of El Paso, Texas, on May 31, 2025, with the launch window opening at 8:30 am CDT (13:30:00 UTC). The live webcast on BlueOrigin.com begun at 8:00 am CDT (T−30 minutes). The capsule was expected to reach an apogee of approximately 107 km (66 mi), allowing passengers to experience a few minutes of weightlessness before descending back to Earth in the Chihuahuan Desert.

The mission patch incorporated symbols representing the crew's backgrounds: a microchip, gears, and Pi symbol for Aymette Medina Jorge's STEM advocacy; a caduceus for Dr. Gretchen Green's radiology career; planets for Paul Jeris' passion for space exploration; a kea parrot for Mark Rocket's New Zealand heritage; and bike gears and Mt. Rainier for Jesse Williams' outdoor pursuits. Jaime Alemán, the first Central American to visit all 193 UN member states, aims to complete the "Grand Chelem" of travel (all UN countries, both poles, and space) with this flight.

Aymette Medina Jorge, a STEM teacher from Galveston, Texas, lead space experiments and Zero-Gravity projects, with her flight sponsored by Mexican company Farmacias Similares to promote Hispanic STEM representation. Dr. Gretchen Green was a radiologist specializing in women's imaging, turned explorer. Paul Jeris, from Put-in-Bay, Ohio, was an entrepreneur whose flight was celebrated with a public watch party at Mr. Ed's.

== Reception ==
The NS-32 mission garnered attention for its diverse crew, including the first New Zealander, Mark Rocket, and the first Panamanian, Jaime Alemán, to fly with Blue Origin. The mission followed the controversial NS-31 flight, which faced criticism for its framing as a feminist milestone and its timing amid economic concerns. The inclusion of STEM educator Aymette Medina Jorge was highlighted as a positive step for inspiring underrepresented communities in science.
