= Blue Origin NS-23 =

Aborted 2022 American uncrewed sub-orbital spaceflight

- Mission type: Sub-orbital spaceflight
- Mission duration: ~5 minutes, 30 seconds
- Apogee: Capsule: 11.4 km (7.1 mi)

Spacecraft properties
- Spacecraft: RSS H. G. Wells
- Manufacturer: Blue Origin

Start of mission
- Launch date: September 12, 2022, 9:27 am CDT (14:27 UTC)
- Rocket: New Shepard (NS3)
- Launch site: Corn Ranch, LS-1
- Contractor: Blue Origin

End of mission
- Destroyed: Tail 3 booster
- Landing date: Capsule: c. September 12, 2022, 9:32:30 am CDT (14:32:30 UTC)
- Landing site: Corn Ranch
- Blue Origin NS-23 mission patch New Shepard flights

Blue Origin NS-23 was a sub-orbital cargo spaceflight mission of Blue Origin's New Shepard rocket, New Shepard Booster 3 (NS3), which launched on September 12, 2022. The booster failed during max q about a minute after launch, triggering the launch escape system which removed the capsule from the booster. The capsule landed successfully, while the booster was destroyed upon impact with the ground.

== Flight ==
The flight involved the capsule RSS H. G. Wells and the propulsion module Tail 3, forming the New Shepard stack. The vehicle was originally intended to launch on August 31 but was grounded by bad weather, first to September 1 and then to September 12.

On September 12, the vehicle lifted off as expected but one minute and four seconds into the flight at an altitude of approximately 8 km (5.0 mi), as the rocket was reaching its maximum dynamic pressure, booster one failed and yellow flames could be seen coming from it. As the rocket begun to tilt the launch escape system was triggered by the booster failure, pushing the capsule away from the booster. The capsule reached an altitude of more than 11 km (7 mi), before successfully deploying its parachutes and landing; the booster impacted in a hazard zone and was destroyed. The flight had no humans aboard, but the same booster design is used on Blue Origin's commercial flights carrying passengers.

As the launch escape system was triggered Blue Origin's live launch commentary went silent, before saying "It appears we've experienced an anomaly with today's flight. This wasn't planned". Blue Origin later tweeted "Booster failure on today's uncrewed flight. Escape system performed as designed".

The flight was the first complete mission failure of the New Shepard vehicle, and the second in-flight anomaly after NS-1, where the booster crashed upon landing, with the capsule landing safely. This was the fourth time the abort motor has been used, and only time outside of testing. The three previous times were a pad abort test, an in flight abort test at max q (NS-6), and an in flight test at high altitude (NS-9).

== Payload ==
NS-23 was the twenty-third flight of the New Shepard vehicle, and the first time the vehicle failed to reach outer space as expected. On board were thirty-six payloads, including eighteen funded by NASA's Flight Opportunities program. Blue Origin expects that the majority of the payloads survived due to the backup safety systems, although two payloads attached to the outside of the booster, including JANUS-APL, are predicted to have been destroyed.

Payload	Operator	Description
AMPES	Infinity Fuel Cell and NASA	Demonstrate the operation of hydrogen fuel cells in microgravity.
Biological Imaging in Support of Suborbital Science	University of Florida	Tests an improved version of the BISS system, including autofocus and improved resolution.
ASSET-1	Honeybee Robotics	Study the strength of regolith under different gravity conditions.
Wings of Steel	NeoCity Academy	Test the effects of gravity on ultrasonic waves.
WAX CASTING	MIT Media Lab	Test how propellants can be fabricated in space.
ENGARTBOX	Anatolia College and Olympiaspace	Attempts to produce a painting in microgravity.
CFOSS	NASA Armstrong Flight Research Center	Test of a space-rated fiber optic sensing system.
JANUS-APL	Johns Hopkins University Applied Physics Laboratory	Mounted outside the capsule to monitor conditions in the atmosphere.
T-2 Mission Arroway	Titan Space Technologies	Test of a sensor-monitoring AI
VARD	Creare, LLC and Dartmouth College	Test a sensor that monitors the volume of liquid in a flexible bladder in microgravity

== Investigation ==
In March 2023, Blue Origin released the findings in the NS-23 failure investigation. The investigation took over six months with little information released publicly during that time. It found that failure in the BE-3PM caused the accident. The engine failure was as a result of higher than expected temperatures due to design changes prior to the accident flight.

Blue Origin stated that it plans to make structural changes to its BE-3 engine in order to withstand higher temperatures, and is targeting a return to flight before the end of 2023.

== Response ==
The Federal Aviation Administration grounded the New Shepard vehicles while it conducts an investigation into "whether any system, process, or procedure related to the mishap affected public safety", noting that the investigation is standard procedure. The chairman of the United States House Science Subcommittee on Space and Aeronautics, Don Beyer, issued a statement, saying that it was a "compelling reminder of the risks of spaceflight".

The incident was expected to cause scheduling delays for Blue Origin, as engineers attempted to identify the cause of the failure and correct it; the New Shepard class was not permitted to fly again until NS24 after the FAA had signed off on their findings.

On September 15, leaders of the United States House Science Subcommittee on Space and Aeronautics called for more transparency from the FAA due to the lack of details regarding the abort. As New Shepard flies humans, the accident would have endangered lives had there been passengers on board. The request for transparency included keeping members of the subcommittee up to date with the investigation, the root cause of the accident once it was determined, and actions to address the cause.

== See also ==
- Soyuz 18a
- Soyuz T-10a
- STS-51-F
- STS-51-L
- Soyuz MS-10
