= Alice Bean =

American physicist

Academic background
- Education: University of California, Irvine; Carnegie Mellon University

Academic work
- Discipline: Physicist
- Sub-discipline: Particle physics
- Institutions: University of Kansas

Alice Louise Bean is an American physicist whose research concerns particle physics, and particularly particles beyond those predicted from the standard model of particle physics. She is a distinguished professor of physics at the University of Kansas.

== Education and career ==
Bean earned bachelor's degrees in Physics, as well as Information and Computer Science, at the University of California, Irvine. She earned an MS and PhD in physics from Carnegie Mellon University. After a postdoctoral research appointment at the University of California, Santa Barbara, she joined the faculty of the University of Kansas in 1993, with a research focus in experimental particle physics.

Bean’s early career work focused on studies of b and c quarks. She helped lead tracking detector development for the D0 collaboration at the Fermi National Accelerator Laboratory, and helped develop the silicon particle detectors for the Compact Muon Solenoid collaboration at the Large Hadron Collider. Her research interests include analysis of top quarks with the Higgs boson, and searching for compressed scenario supersymmetric particle decays with small candidate mass differences. She was a member of the collaboration that experimentally discovered the Higgs Boson. In addition, she contributed to development of radio detectors deployed at the South Pole in search of ultra-high energy neutrino decays.

Her outreach activity includes work on climate change issues with the Office of Religion and Global Affairs of the U.S. Department of State. Bean helped create, and serves as the Project Director and Lead Content Advisor for, a multimedia education project called Quarked!. The content is focused on nanoscale and particle physics concepts for young children.

== Recognition ==
Bean was appointed a fellow of the American Physical Society in 2011 for her contributions to silicon detectors, heavy quark physics, and Quarked!. She has won the University of Kansas Henry E. Gould award for distinguished service to undergraduate engineering education and in 2007 she was awarded the Wally and Marie Steeples faculty award for Outstanding Service to the People of Kansas.
