= New Shepard =

Rocket developed by Blue Origin

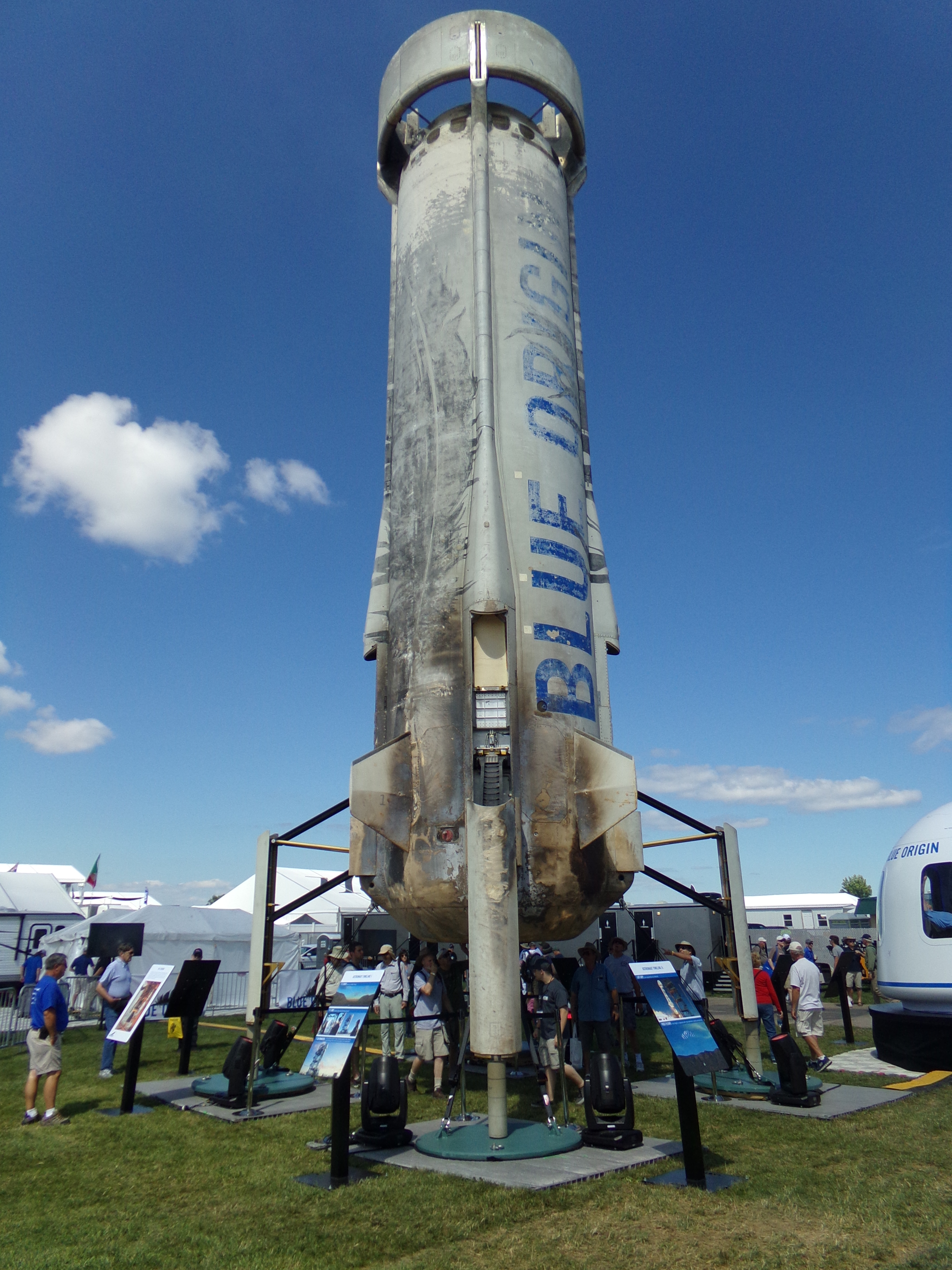
- New Shepard rocket on display at EAA AirVenture Oshkosh in 2017
- Function: Launching tourists and cargo on a suborbital trajectory
- Manufacturer: Blue Origin
- Country of origin: United States of America

Size
- Height: 19.2 m (63 ft)
- Diameter: 3.8 m (12.5 ft)
- Mass: 35,000 kg (77,000 lb)
- Stages: 1

Launch history
- Status: Paused
- Launch sites: Launch Site One
- Total launches: 38
- Success(es): 37
- Failure: 1
- Landings: 36
- First flight: April 29, 2015; 11 years ago
- Last flight: January 22, 2026

Single stage
- Powered by: 1 × BE-3
- Maximum thrust: 490 kN (110,000 lbf)
- Burn time: 141 seconds
- Propellant: LH_{2} / LOX

New Shepard is a fully reusable sub-orbital launch vehicle developed for space tourism by Blue Origin. The vehicle is named after Alan Shepard, for being the first American to travel into space, also being the fifth person to walk on the Moon. The vehicle is capable of vertical takeoff and landings. Additionally, it is also capable of carrying humans and customer payloads into a sub-orbital trajectory.

New Shepard consists of a launch rocket and a crew capsule. The capsule can be configured to house up to six passengers, cargo, or a combination of both. The launch rocket is powered by one BE-3PM engine, which sends the capsule above the Kármán line, where passengers and cargo can experience a few minutes of weightlessness before the capsule returns to Earth.

The launch vehicle is designed to be fully reusable, with the capsule returning to Earth via three parachutes and a solid rocket motor. The rocket lands vertically on a landing pad 3.2 km north of the launch pad. The company has successfully launched and landed the New Shepard launch vehicle 36 times with 1 partial failure deemed successful and 1 failure. The launch vehicle has a length of 19.2 meters (63 ft), a diameter of 3.8 meters (12 ft) and a launch mass of 35,000 kilograms (77,000 lb). The BE-3PM engine produces 490 kilonewtons (110,000 lb_{f}) of thrust at liftoff.

On January 30, 2026, Blue Origin announced further New Shepard launches would be paused for at least two years to allow the company to shift resources to their Blue Moon series of landers in support of the Artemis Program.

== History ==
Timeline of SpaceShipOne, SpaceShipTwo, CSXT and New Shepard sub-orbital flights. Where booster and capsule achieved different altitudes, the higher is plotted. In the SVG file, hover over a point to show details.

The first development vehicle of the New Shepard development program was a sub-scale demonstration vehicle named Goddard that was built in 2006 following earlier engine development efforts by Blue Origin. Goddard was assembled at the Blue Origin facility in Kent, Washington, United States and made its first flight on November 13, 2006. A second test flight was scheduled for December 2, but never took place.

According to Federal Aviation Administration (FAA) records, two further flights were performed by Goddard. Blue Engine 1, or BE-1, was the first rocket engine developed by Blue Origin and was used in the company's Goddard development vehicle. On the path to developing the New Shepard launch vehicle, a crew capsule was also needed, and design was begun on a space capsule in the early 2000s. One development milestone along the way became public. On October 19, 2012, Blue Origin conducted a successful pad escape of a full-scale suborbital crew capsule at its West Texas launch site. For the test, the capsule fired its pusher escape motor and launched from a launch vehicle simulator. The Crew Capsule traveled to an altitude of 703 m (2,307 ft) under active thrust vector control before descending safely by parachute to a soft landing 500 m (1,630 ft) downrange.

In April 2015, Blue Origin announced that they had completed acceptance testing of the BE-3PM engine that would power the New Shepard launch vehicle. The company also announced that they intended to begin flight testing of the New Shepard later in 2015, with initial flights occurring as frequently as monthly, with "a series of dozens of flights over the extent of the sub-orbital test program [taking] a couple of years to complete". The same month, the FAA announced that the regulatory paperwork for the test program had already been filed and approved, and test flights were expected to begin before mid-May 2015. By February 2016, three New Shepard vehicles had been built. The first was lost in a test in April 2015, the second had flown twice (see below), and the third was completing manufacture at the Blue Origin factory in Kent, Washington, United States. In 2016, the Blue Origin team were awarded the Collier Trophy for demonstrating rocket reusability with the New Shepard human spaceflight vehicle.

On July 20, 2021, the company successfully completed its first crewed mission, Blue Origin NS-16, into space using its New Shepard launch vehicle, carrying passengers Jeff Bezos, his brother Mark Bezos, Wally Funk, and Oliver Daemen. The flight was approximately 10 minutes and crossed the Kármán line. New Shepard performed six crewed flights between July 2021 and August 2022, taking a mix of sponsored celebrities such as Wally Funk, William Shatner as well as paying customers. New Shepard ticket sales brought in $50 million through June 2022. The second and third crewed missions of New Shepard took place in October and December 2021. The fourth crewed flight happened in March 2022. On June 4, 2022, New Shepard completed its fifth crewed mission launch and the sixth crewed flight took place on August 4, 2022. In September 2022, an uncrewed mission of the New Shepard had an anomaly due to a failure of the BE-3PM main engine. The launch escape system triggered and the capsule landed safely. The remaining New Shepard launch vehicles were grounded pending an FAA investigation into the incident. After a six-month investigation, Blue Origin pinpointed the cause of the anomaly as a thermal-structure failure of the BE-3PM engine nozzle caused a thrust misalignment that triggered the capsule's emergency escape system to activate. Blue Origin said in its press release that New Shepard flights would resume as soon as possible.

As of June 2022, the company had generated more than $100M from the New Shepard space tourism program.

The return to flight mission happened on December 19, 2023.

On February 4, 2025, an uncrewed New Shepard rocket was launched. The NS-29 mission was intended to launch about 30 moon-related technologies.

On April 14, 2025, Blue Origin completed a successful sub-orbital crewed mission of six women aboard its Blue Origin NS-31 as part of the New Shepard Program. Passengers included Gayle King, Katy Perry, Amanda Nguyen, Aisha Bowe, Lauren Sanchez, and Kerianne Flynn. The flight reached a peak altitude of 106 km and lasted 10 minutes and 21 seconds.

On January 30, 2026, Blue Origin announced further New Shepard launches would be paused for at least two years to allow the company to shift resources to their Blue Moon series of landers in support of the Artemis Program.

== New Shepard vehicles ==
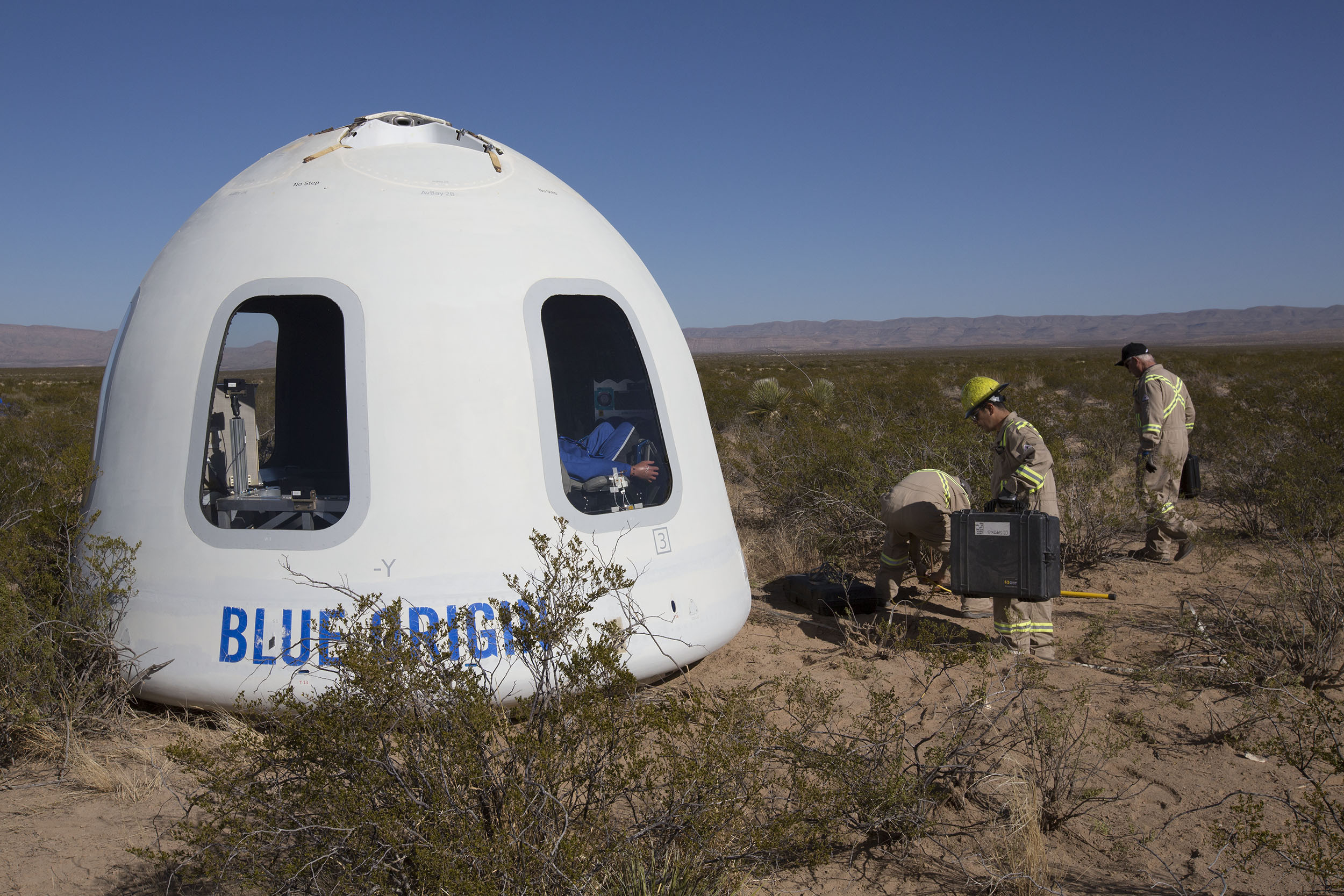
The New Shepard Crew Capsule after a successful sub-orbital space flight.

=== New Shepard propulsion modules ===
As of 2024, there have been five propulsion modules built. They are NS1, NS2, NS3, NS4, and NS5. At the time of the program being paused in 2026, there were four new propulsion modules under construction (NS6, NS7, NS8, and NS9), three of which were expected to fly in 2026.

==== New Shepard 1 ====
The first flight of the full-scale New Shepard vehicle was NS1, also called "Tail 1" and was conducted on April 29, 2015, during which an altitude of 93.5 km (58.1 mi) was attained. While the test flight itself was deemed a success, and the capsule was successfully recovered via parachute landing, the rocket crash landed and was not recovered due to a failure of hydraulic pressure in the vehicle control system during descent. The capsule was called RSS Jules Verne.

==== New Shepard 2 ====
The New Shepard 2 (NS2), also called "Tail 2", flight test article propulsion module made five successful flights in 2015 and 2016, being retired after its fifth flight in October 2016.

==== New Shepard 3 ====
New Shepard 3 (NS3), also called "Tail 3", along with capsule RSS H. G. Wells, was modified for increased reusability and improved thermal protection; it included a redesigned propulsion module and the inclusion of new access panels for more rapid servicing and improved thermal protection. NS3 was the third propulsion module built. It was completed and shipped to the launch site by September 2017, although parts of it had been built as early as March 2016. Flight tests began in 2017 and continued into 2019. The new Crew Capsule 2.0, featuring windows, was integrated to the NS3. NS3 was only ever used to fly cargo; no passengers were carried (as was originally planned for NS3).

Its initial flight test occurred on December 12, 2017. This was the first flight flown under the regulatory regime of a launch license granted by the FAA. Previous test flights had flown under an experimental permit, which did not allow Blue Origin to carry cargo for which it was paid for commercially. This made the flight of NS3 the first revenue flight for payloads, and it carried 12 experiments on the flight, as well as a test dummy given the moniker "Mannequin Skywalker".

Since the maiden flight, "Blue Origin has been making updates to the vehicle ... intended primarily to improve operability rather than performance or reliability. Those upgrades took longer than expected" leading to a several-month gap in test flights. The second test flight took place on April 29, 2018. The 10th overall New Shepard flight, and the fourth NS3 flight, had originally been planned for December 2018, but was delayed due to "ground infrastructure issues". Following a diagnostics of the initial issue, Blue Origin rescheduled the launch for early 2019, after discovering "additional systems" that needed repairs as well. The flight launched on January 23, 2019, and successfully flew to space with a maximum altitude of 106.9 km (66.4 mi). It has been used to test SPLICE ("Safe and Precise Landing – Integrated Capabilities Evolution"), a NASA lunar landing technology demonstration, on two separate flights in October 2020 (NS-13) and August 2021 (NS-17).

New Shepard 3 rocket was destroyed during the NS-23 mission once it impacted the ground on September 12, 2022, after a rocket engine anomaly led to the activation of the in-flight abort system. The capsule made a successful landing under parachutes. This was the ninth flight of NS3, and the flight was not carrying any people on board.

==== New Shepard 4 ====
New Shepard 4 (NS4), also called "Tail 4", which flies with capsule RSS First Step, was the fourth propulsion module to be built and the first to carry human passengers. Bezos himself was a passenger. The vehicle was manufactured in 2018 and moved to the Blue Origin West Texas launch facility in December 2019. The uncrewed maiden launch of NS4 occurred on January 14, 2021. NS4 was successfully launched on July 20, 2021, with four passengers; Jeff Bezos was aboard this maiden crewed flight. On October 13, 2021, NS4 successfully launched and landed, carrying four passengers, including notable passenger William Shatner. On December 11, 2021, Blue Origin NS-19 successfully launched into space. This was the first time New Shepard carried six passengers, the full design passenger complement. In October 2024, National Air and Space Museum announced that Blue Origin will donate NS4 in future to be displayed in the museum.

==== New Shepard 5 ====
New Shepard 5 (NS5), also called "Tail 5", which flies with capsule RSS Kármán Line, is Blue Origin's second crew-rated propulsion module. Manufactured to meet growing demand for New Shepard flights, it debuted on the NS-27 uncrewed flight, which flew on October 23, 2024, following aborted launch attempts on October 7, 2024, and October 13, 2024.

=== New Shepard capsules ===
As of 2025, four New Shepard capsules have been constructed. They are RSS Jules Verne, RSS H. G. Wells, RSS First Step, and RSS Kármán Line. RSS H. G. Wells was retired from service after its twelfth flight. At the time of the program being paused in 2026, there were two new unnamed capsules under construction.

=== Boosters destroyed, retired and active ===
S/N	Launches	Launch date (UTC)	Turnaround time	Mission	Launch	Landing	Status
NS1	1	29 April 2015	—N/a	Blue Origin NS-1	Success	Failure	Destroyed
NS2	5	23 November 2015	—N/a	Blue Origin NS-2	Success	Success	Retired
NS2	5	22 January 2016	60 days	Blue Origin NS-3	Success	Success	Retired
NS2	5	2 April 2016	71 days	Blue Origin NS-4	Success	Success	Retired
NS2	5	19 June 2016	78 days	Blue Origin NS-5	Success	Success	Retired
NS2	5	5 October 2016	108 days	Blue Origin NS-6	Success	Success	Retired
NS3	9	12 December 2017	—N/a	Blue Origin NS-7	Success	Success	Destroyed
NS3	9	29 April 2018	138 days	Blue Origin NS-8	Success	Success	Destroyed
NS3	9	18 July 2018	80 days	Blue Origin NS-9	Success	Success	Destroyed
NS3	9	23 January 2019	189 days	Blue Origin NS-10	Success	Success	Destroyed
NS3	9	2 May 2019	99 days	Blue Origin NS-11	Success	Success	Destroyed
NS3	9	11 December 2019	223 days	Blue Origin NS-12	Success	Success	Destroyed
NS3	9	13 October 2020	307 days	Blue Origin NS-13	Success	Success	Destroyed
NS3	9	26 August 2021	317 days	Blue Origin NS-17	Success	Success	Destroyed
NS3	9	12 September 2022	382 days	Blue Origin NS-23	Failure	Failure	Destroyed
NS4	17	14 January 2021	—N/a	Blue Origin NS-14	Success	Success	Active
NS4	17	14 April 2021	90 days	Blue Origin NS-15	Success	Success	Active
NS4	17	20 July 2021	97 days	Blue Origin NS-16	Success	Success	Active
NS4	17	13 October 2021	85 days	Blue Origin NS-18	Success	Success	Active
NS4	17	11 December 2021	59 days	Blue Origin NS-19	Success	Success	Active
NS4	17	31 March 2022	110 days	Blue Origin NS-20	Success	Success	Active
NS4	17	4 June 2022	65 days	Blue Origin NS-21	Success	Success	Active
NS4	17	4 August 2022	61 days	Blue Origin NS-22	Success	Success	Active
NS4	17	19 December 2023	502 days	Blue Origin NS-24	Success	Success	Active
NS4	17	19 May 2024	152 days	Blue Origin NS-25	Success	Success	Active
NS4	17	29 August 2024	102 days	Blue Origin NS-26	Success	Success	Active
NS4	17	22 November 2024	85 days	Blue Origin NS-28	Success	Success	Active
NS4	17	25 February 2025	95 days	Blue Origin NS-30	Success	Success	Active
NS4	17	31 May 2025	95 days	Blue Origin NS-32	Success	Success	Active
NS4	17	3 August 2025	64 days	Blue Origin NS-34	Success	Success	Active
NS4	17	8 October 2025	66 days	Blue Origin NS-36	Success	Success	Active
NS4	17	22 January 2026	106 days	Blue Origin NS-38	Success	Success	Active
NS5	6	23 October 2024	—N/a	Blue Origin NS-27	Success	Success	Active
NS5	6	4 February 2025	104 days	Blue Origin NS-29	Success	Success	Active
NS5	6	14 April 2025	69 days	Blue Origin NS-31	Success	Success	Active
NS5	6	29 June 2025	76 days	Blue Origin NS-33	Success	Success	Active
NS5	6	18 September 2025	81 days	Blue Origin NS-35	Success	Success	Active
NS5	6	20 December 2025	93 days	Blue Origin NS-37	Success	Success	Active

== Flight statistics ==
=== Launch payload ===
- Uncrewed
- Crewed

=== Capsule used ===
- RSS Jules Verne
- RSS H. G. Wells
- RSS First Step
- RSS Kármán Line

=== Launch outcomes ===
- Failure
- Partial failure
- Success
- Scheduled

=== Landing outcomes ===
- Failure
- Success

=== Flight list ===
Launch No.	Date	Vehicle	Apogee	Passengers	Outcome	Notes
0	October 19, 2012	N/A; RSS Jules Verne	0.7 km (0.4369 mi)	—N/a	Success	Pad abort test of the New Shepard capsule.
1	April 29, 2015	NS1; RSS Jules Verne	93.5 km (58.1 mi)	—N/a	Partial success	Capsule recovered, rocket crashed on landing. Blue Origin deemed mission successful.
2	November 23, 2015; 17:21	NS2.1; RSS Jules Verne	100.5 km (62.5 mi)	—N/a	Success	Sub-orbital spaceflight and landing.
3	January 22, 2016	NS2.2; RSS Jules Verne	101.7 km (63.2 mi)	—N/a	Success	Sub-orbital spaceflight and landing of a reused rocket.
4	April 2, 2016; 15:18	NS2.3; RSS Jules Verne	103.4 km (64.2 mi)	—N/a	Success	Sub-orbital spaceflight and landing of a reused rocket.
5	June 19, 2016; 14:36	NS2.4; RSS Jules Verne	101.0 km (62.8 mi)	—N/a	Success	Sub-orbital spaceflight and landing of a reused rocket: the fourth launch and landing of the same rocket. Blue Origin published a live webcast of the takeoff and landing.
6	October 5, 2016; 15:36	NS2.5; RSS Jules Verne	Rocket: 93.7 km (58.2 mi); Capsule: 7.1 km (4.4 mi)	—N/a	Success	Sub-orbital spaceflight and landing of a reused rocket. Successful test of the in-flight abort system. The fifth and final launch and landing of the same rocket (NS2).
7	December 12, 2017; 16:59	NS3.1; RSS H. G. Wells	Rocket: 98.2 km (61.0 mi); Capsule: 98.3 km (61.1 mi)	—N/a	Success	Flight to just under 100 km and landing. The first launch of NS3 and a new Crew Capsule 2.0.
8	April 29, 2018; 17:06	NS3.2; RSS H. G. Wells	107.0 km (66.5 mi)	—N/a	Success	Sub-orbital spaceflight and landing of a reused rocket.
9	July 18, 2018; 15:11	NS3.3; RSS H. G. Wells	118.8 km (73.8 mi)	—N/a	Success	Sub-orbital spaceflight and landing of a reused rocket, with capsule carrying a mannequin. Successful test of the in-flight abort system at high altitude. Flight duration was 11 minutes.
10	January 23, 2019; 14:05	NS3.4; RSS H. G. Wells	c. 106.9 km (66.4 mi)	—N/a	Success	Sub-orbital flight, delayed from December 18, 2018. Eight NASA research and technology payloads were flown.
11	May 2, 2019; 13:34	NS3.5; RSS H. G. Wells	c. 105.5 km (65.5 mi)	—N/a	Success	Sub-orbital flight. Maximum Ascent Velocity: 3,568 km/h (2,217 mph), duration: 10 minutes, 10 seconds. Payload: 38 microgravity research payloads (nine sponsored by NASA).
12	December 11, 2019; 17:53	NS3.6; RSS H. G. Wells	c. 104.5 km (64.9 mi)	—N/a	Success	Sub-orbital flight, Payload: Multiple commercial, research (8 sponsored by NASA) and educational payloads, including postcards from Club for the Future. The sixth launch and landing of the same rocket.
13	October 13, 2020; 13:37	NS3.7; RSS H. G. Wells	c. 107.0 km (66.5 mi)	—N/a	Success	7th flight of the same capsule/rocket. Onboard 12 payloads include Space Lab Technologies, Southwest Research Institute, postcards and seeds for Club for the Future, and multiple payloads for NASA including SPLICE to test future lunar landing technologies in support of the Artemis program.
14	January 14, 2021; 16:57	NS4.1; RSS First Step	Rocket: 106.9 km (66.5 mi); Capsule: 107.1 km (66.5 mi)	—N/a	Success	Qualification flight for NS4 rocket and capsule and maiden flight for NS4
15	April 14, 2021; 16:51	NS4.2; RSS First Step	Rocket: 106.9 km (66.4 mi); Capsule: 107.1 km (66.5 mi)	—N/a	Success	Second flight of NS4, first preflight human passenger process test where Blue Origin conducted an "Astronaut Rehearsal". Gary Lai, Susan Knapp, Clay Mowry, and Audrey Powers, all Blue Origin personnel, were "stand-in astronauts". Lai and Powers briefly entered the capsule during the test.
16	July 20, 2021; 13:12	NS4.3; RSS First Step	Rocket: 105.8 km (65.8 mi); Capsule: 107.0 km (66.5 mi)	Jeff Bezos; Mark Bezos; Wally Funk; Oliver Daemen	Success	First flight of New Shepard with passengers.
17	August 25, 2021; 14:31	NS3.8; RSS H. G. Wells	Rocket: 105.8 km (65.7 mi); Capsule: 105.9 km (65.8 mi)	—N/a	Success	Payload mission consisting of 18 commercial payloads inside the capsule, a NASA lunar landing technology demonstration installed on the exterior of the rocket and an art installation installed on the exterior of the capsule.
18	October 13, 2021; 14:49	NS4.4; RSS First Step	Rocket: 106.9 km (66.4 mi); Capsule: 107.0 km (66.5 mi)	Chris Boshuizen; Glen de Vries; William Shatner; Audrey Powers	Success	
19	December 11, 2021; 10:50	NS4.5; RSS First Step	Rocket: 106.9 km (66.4 mi); Capsule: 107.1 km (66.5 mi)	Lane Bess; Cameron Bess; Evan Dick; Laura Shepard Churchley; Michael Strahan; Dylan Taylor	Success	
20	March 31, 2022; 13:57	NS4.6; RSS First Step	Rocket: 107.0 km (66.5 mi); Capsule: 107.1 km (66.5 mi)	Marty Allen; Sharon Hagle; Marc Hagle; Jim Kitchen; George Nield; Gary Lai	Success	
21	June 4, 2022; 13:25	NS4.7; RSS First Step	Rocket: 106.9 km (66.4 mi); Capsule: 107.0 km (66.5 mi)	Evan Dick; Katya Echazarreta; Hamish Harding; Victor Correa Hespanha; Jaison Robinson; Victor Vescovo	Success	
22	August 4, 2022; 13:56	NS4.8; RSS First Step	Rocket: 106.9 km (66.5 mi); Capsule: 107.1 km (66.5 mi)	Coby Cotton; Mário Ferreira; Vanessa O'Brien; Clint Kelly III; Sara Sabry; Steve Young	Success	
23	September 12, 2022; 14:27	NS3.9; RSS H. G. Wells	11.4 km (7.1 mi)	—N/a	Failure	Research mission with 36 commercial payloads on board including two on the exterior of the rocket. The spacecraft's launch escape system activated after the rocket's BE-3 main engine failed around a minute after liftoff leading to a loss of control. The capsule was safely recovered whilst the rocket was lost as it impacted on ground.
24	December 1, 2023; 16:43	NS4.9; RSS H. G. Wells	Rocket: 106.9 km (66.4 mi); Capsule: 107.1 km (66.5 mi)	—N/a	Success	Successful Return to Flight mission following failure of NS-23 more than a year prior. 33 payloads and 38,000 Club for the Future postcards from students around the world.
25	May 19, 2024; 13:30	NS4.10; RSS First Step	c. 106 km	Kenneth Hess; Sylvain Chiron; Mason Angel; Ed Dwight; Carol Schaller; Gopi Thotakura	Success	
26	August 29, 2024; 13:07	NS4.11; RSS First Step	Capsule: 105.3 km (65.4 mi)	Ephraim Rabin; Nicolina Elrick; Eugene Grin; Rob Ferl; Karsen Kitchen; Eiman Jahangir	Success	
27	October 23, 2024; 15:27	NS5.1; RSS Kármán Line	Capsule: 101 km (63 mi)	—N/a	Success	First flight of Propulsion Module NS5 and capsule RSS Kármán Line. 12 payloads and tens of thousands of Club for the Future postcards.
28	November 22, 2024; 15:30	NS4.12; RSS First Step	Capsule 107.08 km (66.54 mi)	Emily Calandrelli; Sharon Hagle; Marc Hagle; Austin Litteral; James "J.D." Russell; Henry Wolfond	Success	
29	February 4, 2025; 16:00	NS5.2; RSS H. G. Wells	Rocket: 105.3 km (65.4 mi); Capsule: 105.3 km (65.5 mi)	—N/a	Success	Research mission on behalf of NASA, simulated lunar gravity by spinning the capsule at 11 rpm using the spacecraft's reaction control system. 30 payloads, 29 internal and one external.
30	February 25, 2025; 15:49	NS4.13; RSS First Step	Rocket: 106.5 km (66.2 mi); Capsule: 106.4 km (66.1 mi)	Lane Bess; Jesús Calleja; Tushar Shah; Richard Scott; Elaine Chia Hyde; Russell Wilson	Success	
31	April 14, 2025; 13:30	NS5.3; RSS Kármán Line	Rocket: 106.7 km (66.3 mi); Capsule: 106.8 km (66.4 mi)	Aisha Bowe; Amanda Nguyen; Gayle King; Katy Perry; Kerianne Flynn; Lauren Sánchez	Success	First spaceflight with an all-female crew since Vostok 6 in 1963.
32	May 31, 2025; 13:39	NS4.14; RSS First Step	Rocket: 104.7 km (65.1 mi); Capsule: 104.8 km (65.1 mi)	Aymette Medina Jorge; Gretchen Green; Jaime Alemán; Jesse Williams; Mark Rocket; Paul Jeris	Success	
33	June 29, 2025; 14:40	NS5.4; RSS Kármán Line	Rocket: 106.2 km (66.0 mi); Capsule: 106.3 km (66.0 mi)	Allie Kuehner; Carl Kuehner; Leland Larson; Freddie Rescigno, Jr.; Owolabi Salis; James Sitkins	Success	
34	August 3, 2025; 12:42	NS4.15; RSS First Step	Rocket: 106.8 km (66.4 mi); Capsule: 106.9 km (66.4 mi)	Arvi Bahal; Gökhan Erdem; Deborah Martorell; Lionel Pitchford; J. D. Russell; Justin Sun	Success	
35	September 18, 2025; 13:00	NS5.5; RSS H. G. Wells	Rocket: 105.2 km (65.4 mi); Capsule: 105.3 km (65.4 mi)	—N/a	Success	Uncrewed flight that flew more than 40 scientific and research payloads to space and back. These payloads include 24 experiments from NASA’s TechRise Student Challenge, and payloads for Johns Hopkins Applied Physics Laboratory, University, College, Teledyne, Space Lab Technologies, and Teachers in Space, among others. Final flight for RSS H. G. Wells.
36	October 8, 2025; 13:40	NS4.16; RSS First Step	Rocket: 106.7 km (66.3 mi); Capsule: 106.8 km (66.4 mi)	Jeff Elgin; Danna Karagussova; Clint Kelly III; Aaron Newman; Vitalii Ostrovsky; William H. Lewis	Success	
37	December 20, 2025; 14:15	NS5.6; RSS Karman Line	Rocket: 106.7 km (66.3 mi); Capsule: 106.8 km (66.4 mi)	Michaela Benthaus; Joey Hyde; Hans Koenigsmann; Neal Milch; Adonis Pouroulis; Jason Stansell	Success	First flight to carry a wheelchair user into space, with Benthaus onboard.
38	January 22, 2026; 16:25	NS4.17; RSS First Step	Rocket: 106.7 km (66.3 mi); Capsule: 106.8 km (66.4 mi)	Tim Drexler; Linda Edwards; Alain Fernandez; Alberto Gutiérrez; Jim Hendren; Laura Stiles	Success	Originally planned to fly with Andrew Yaffe onboard, who was replaced by Stiles due to illness.

=== Multiple fliers ===
==== Two flights ====
- Evan Dick — NS-19 and NS-21
- Lane Bess — NS-19 and NS-30
- Marc Hagle — NS-20 and NS-28
- Sharon Hagle — NS-20 and NS-28
- J. D. Russell — NS-28 and NS-34
- Clint Kelly III — NS-22 and NS-36

== Design ==
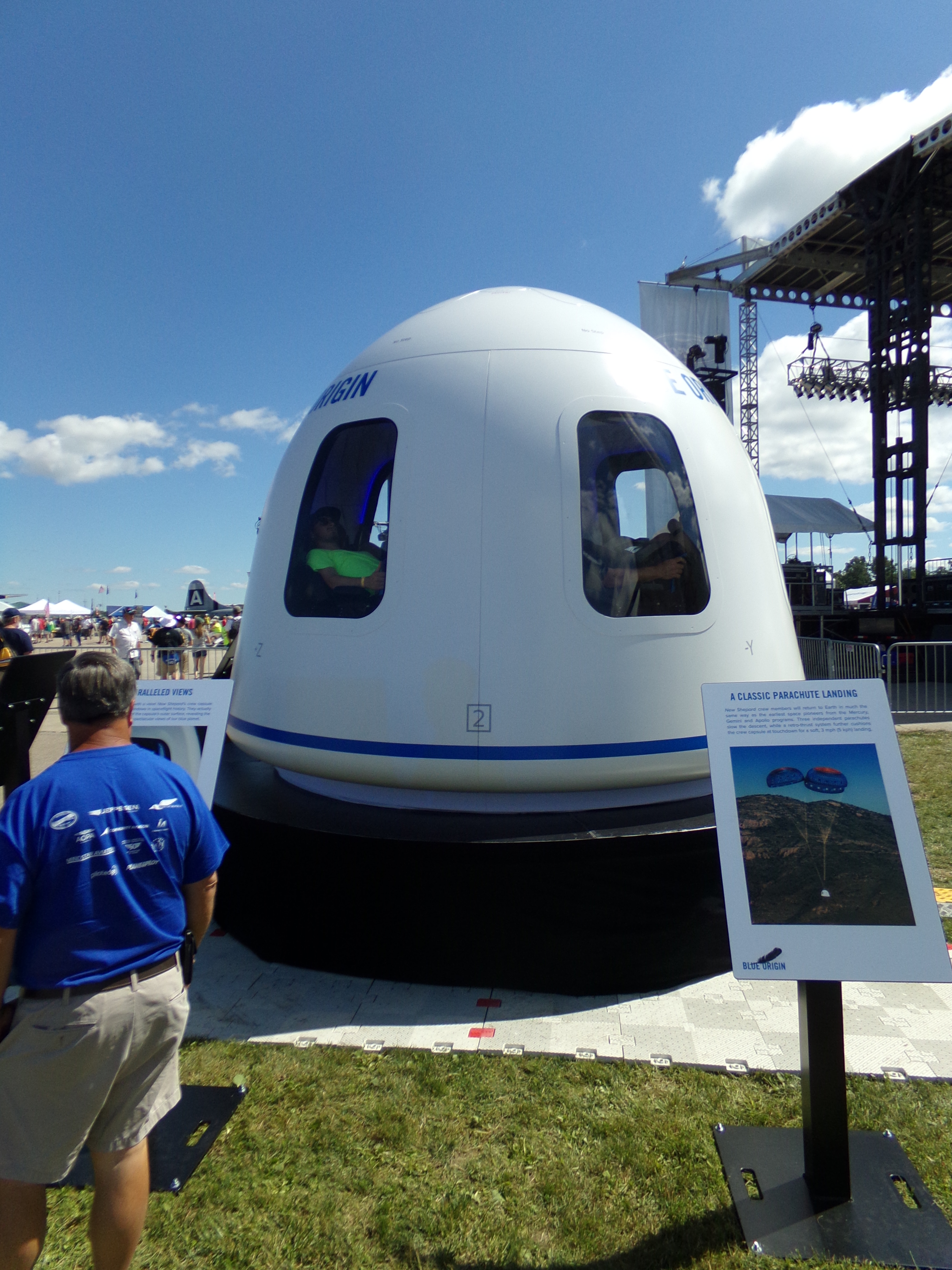
Mock-up of the New Shepard capsule at the EAA AirVenture Oshkosh in 2017

New Shepard is a fully reusable, vertical takeoff, vertical landing (VTVL) space vehicle composed of two principal parts: a pressurized crew capsule and a launch rocket that Blue Origin often calls a booster or propulsion module. The New Shepard is controlled entirely by on-board computers, without ground control or a human pilot.

=== Launch rocket ===
The launch rocket is powered by one BE-3PM engine with thrust vector control, fueled by liquid oxygen and liquid hydrogen. Aft fins stabilize the rocket during ascent, steer it back to the landing pad during descent, and guide it effectively at speeds up to Mach 3. Ring and wedge fins near the top of the rocket provide aerodynamic stability and reduce fuel consumption during descent. Drag brakes are also deployed during descent to increase drag and reduce speed. The gimbaling engine nozzle and aft fins work together to steer the rocket, both using hydraulic actuators.

=== Crew capsule ===
The New Shepard crew capsule is a pressurized crew capsule designed to carry up to six people. It supports a "full-envelope" launch escape system that can separate the capsule from the launch rocket at any point during ascent. The Crew Capsule Escape Solid Rocket Motor (CCE-SRM) is sourced from Aerojet Rocketdyne. The interior volume of the capsule is 15 cubic meters (530 ft^{3}), containing 6 windows, 6 reclined seats, and handholds for ease of movement in zero-g. At the center of the capsule is a cylinder housing the crew escape system. After separation from the launch rocket, three parachutes deploy for a soft landing. In the event of a parachute failure, the capsule can still land safely with one of three parachutes deployed. Before touchdown, a retro-thrust system at the bottom of the capsule expels nitrogen gas to slow the landing to approximately 3.2 km/h (2 mph). Additionally, a crushable ring, 14 centimeters (5.5 inches) high, compresses upon impact on the underside of the capsule and acts as a decelerator to absorb g-forces.

== Flight profile ==
Following horizontal rollout atop a trailer and being raised vertical in the early morning hours before launch, as well as tests of the wedge fins, aft fins, drag brakes, and a landing gear system (LGS) check on the pad, New Shepard is launched 48 kilometres (30 mi; 26 nmi) north of Van Horn, Texas, at Launch Site One (LS1), and conducts a powered flight for about 110 seconds, up to an altitude of 40 km (25 mi; 22 nmi), in the morning or early afternoon.

The rocket and capsule separate approximately 15 seconds after MECO, then continue coasting upwards due to their momentum, reaching an apogee just above the Kármán Line at 100 km (62 mi; 54 nmi; 330,000 ft). As the rocket descends, its wedge fins and drag brakes deploy and the engines restart as onboard computers autonomously bring the rocket for a vertical landing at the landing pad 3.24 km (2.01 mi; 1.75 nmi; 10,600 ft) north of the launch site, where it deploys its four landing legs. The crew capsule descends afterward under three parachutes. The crew capsule can also separate in case of a vehicle malfunction or other emergency using a pusher solid rocket motor. Capsule touchdown also includes the use of a nitrogen gas retro-thrust system and crushable ring. The total flight duration of the rocket is over 7 minutes, while the total flight time for the capsule is around 10 minutes.

== NASA suborbital research payloads ==
As of March 2011, Blue Origin had submitted the New Shepard reusable launch vehicle for use as an uncrewed rocket for NASA's suborbital reusable launch vehicle (sRLV) solicitation under NASA's Flight Opportunities Program. Blue Origin projects 100 km (62 mi) altitude in flights of approximately ten minutes duration, while carrying an 11.3 kg (25 lb) research payload. By March 2016, Blue Origin noted that they are "due to start flying unaccompanied scientific payloads later [in 2016]." On April 29, 2018, during its eighth flight New Shepard carried the Schmitt Space Communicator SC-1x, a three-pound device developed by Solstar that launched the first commercial Wi-Fi hotspot service in space and sent the first commercial Twitter message from space. NASA provided a part of the $2 million project's funding as a part of its Flight Opportunities program.

On 12 September 2022, 18 NASA payloads were flying on NS-23 when an in-flight failure of the rocket's main engine caused an emergency ejection of the payload capsule. The payload capsule landed safely and was recovered whilst the rocket was lost.

=== Involvement with NASA Commercial Crew Development Program ===
Blue Origin received US$3.7 million in Commercial Crew Development (CCDev) phase 1 to advance several development objectives of its innovative "pusher" Launch Abort System (LAS) and composite pressure vessel.

In February 2011, with the end of the second ground test nearly complete, the company completed all work envisioned under the phase 1 contract for the pusher escape system. They also "completed work on the other aspect of its award, risk reduction work on a composite pressure vessel" for the vehicle.
