= Wally Funk =

American aviator and Mercury 13 astronaut (1939–2026)

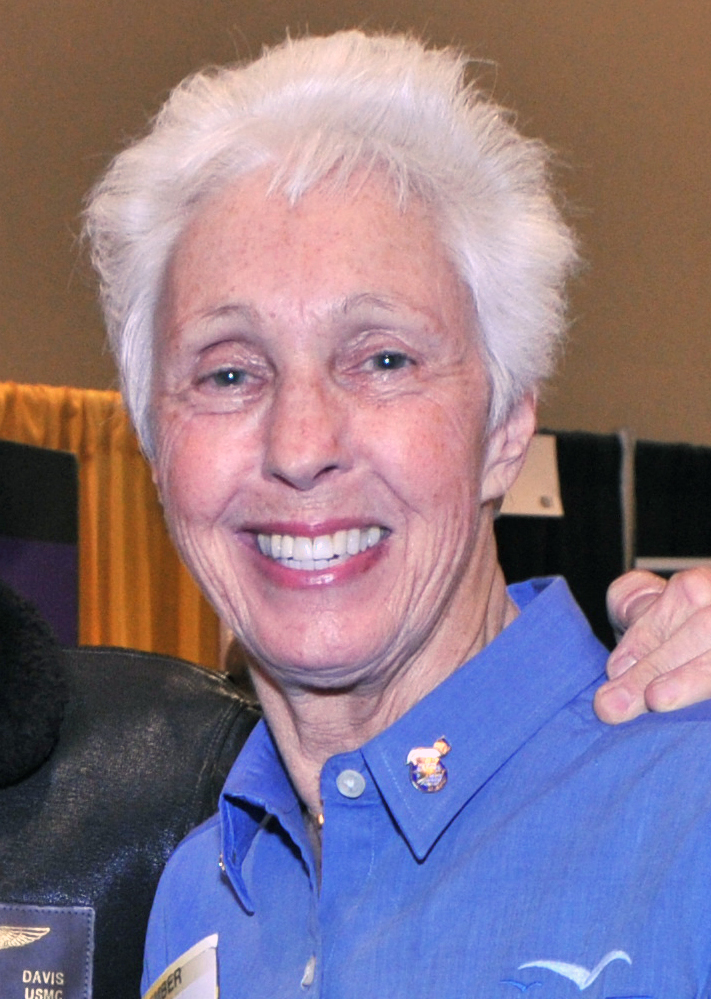
- Funk in 2012
- Born: February 1, 1939; Las Vegas, New Mexico, U.S.
- Died: July 8, 2026 (aged 87); Grapevine, Texas, U.S.
- Education: Stephens College Oklahoma State University
- Known for: First female FAA and NTSB inspector; one of the Mercury 13; oldest woman to fly in space
- Space career

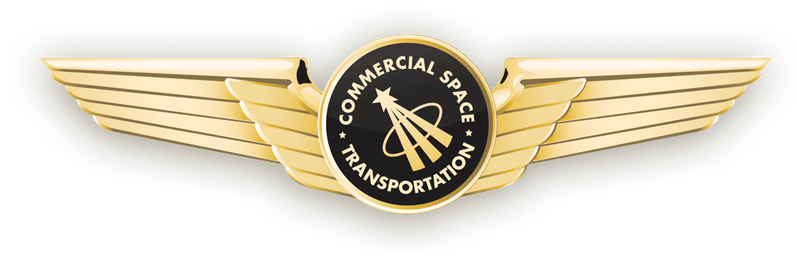
Commercial Astronaut
- Flight time: 10 minutes, 18 seconds
- Missions: NS-16

Mary Wallace Funk (February 1, 1939 – July 8, 2026) was an American aviator, commercial astronaut, and goodwill ambassador. She was the first female air safety investigator for the National Transportation Safety Board, the first female civilian flight instructor at Fort Sill, Oklahoma, and the first female Federal Aviation Administration inspector, as well as one of the Mercury 13 group.

Funk became the oldest person to go to space on July 20, 2021, at age 82, flying on Blue Origin's New Shepard spacecraft during its suborbital flight, breaking a record held by John Glenn for 23 years. Her record would stand until later that year when William Shatner's flight took place on October 13; Shatner was age 90 at the time. As of 2026, Funk remains the oldest woman to have traveled into space.

She was the last surviving member of the Mercury 13 group. Funk was also the only one of the 13 to have traveled to space.

== Early life ==
Funk was born in Las Vegas, New Mexico, on February 1, 1939, and grew up in Taos, New Mexico. Her parents owned a variety store. The family had a collection of artwork from artists at the Taos art colony, as the artists would trade artwork to pay off their debt at the store.

As a child, Funk was captivated by planes. When she was one year old, her parents took her to an airport near where they lived in New Mexico and she got up close to a Douglas DC-3, an early airliner. "I go right to the wheel and I try to turn the nut", she recalled in an interview. "Mother said: 'She's going to fly.'" She became interested in mechanics and built model airplanes and ships. By the time she was seven, she was making planes from balsa wood. At nine, she had her first flying lesson.

Funk was also an accomplished outdoorswoman, spending time riding her bike or her horse, skiing, hunting, and fishing. At age 14, she became an expert marksman, receiving the Distinguished Rifleman's Award. The National Rifle Association of America sent her shooting results to President Dwight Eisenhower, and he wrote back to her. At the same time she represented the southwestern United States as a Top Female Skier in Slalom and Downhill races in U.S. competitions.

== Education and flight school ==
As a high school student, Funk wanted to take courses such as mechanical drawing and auto mechanics, but because she was a girl, she was permitted to take only courses such as home economics. Frustrated, Funk left high school early at the age of 16 and entered Stephens College in Columbia, Missouri. Funk became a member of the "Flying Susies" and rated first in her class of 24 fliers. She graduated in 1958 with her pilot's license and an Associate of Arts degree.

Funk moved on to complete a Bachelor of Science degree in Secondary Education at Oklahoma State University. While at OSU, Funk was a member of Alpha Chi Omega, Gamma Epsilon chapter. Funk was drawn to OSU primarily by its famous "Flying Aggies" program. At OSU, Funk earned a large number of aviation certificates and ratings, including her Commercial, Single-engine Land, Multi-engine Land, Single-engine Sea, Instrument, Flight Instructor's, and all Ground Instructor's ratings. Funk was elected as an officer of the "Flying Aggies" and flew for them in the International Collegiate Air Meets. She received the "Outstanding Female Pilot" trophy, the "Flying Aggie Top Pilot", and the "Alfred Alder Memorial Trophy" two years in a row.

== Aviation career ==
At 20 years old, Funk became a professional aviator. Her first job was at Fort Sill, Oklahoma, as a civilian flight instructor of noncommissioned and commissioned officers of the United States Army. Funk was the first female flight instructor at a U.S. military base. In the fall of 1961, she accepted a job as a certified flight instructor, charter, and chief pilot with an aviation company in Hawthorne, California.

Funk earned her Airline Transport Rating in 1968, the 58th woman in the U.S. to do so. She applied to three commercial airlines but, like other qualified female pilots, was turned away because of her sex.

In 1971, Funk earned the rating of flight inspector from the Federal Aviation Administration (FAA), becoming the first woman to complete the FAA's General Aviation Operations Inspector Academy course, which includes Pilot Certification and Flight Testing procedures, handling accidents, and violations. She worked for four years with the FAA as a field examiner, the first woman to do so. In 1973 she was promoted to FAA SWAP (Systems Worthiness Analysis Program) as a specialist, the first woman in the United States to hold this position. In late November 1973, Funk again entered the FAA Academy to take courses involving air-taxi, charter, and aviation rental businesses.

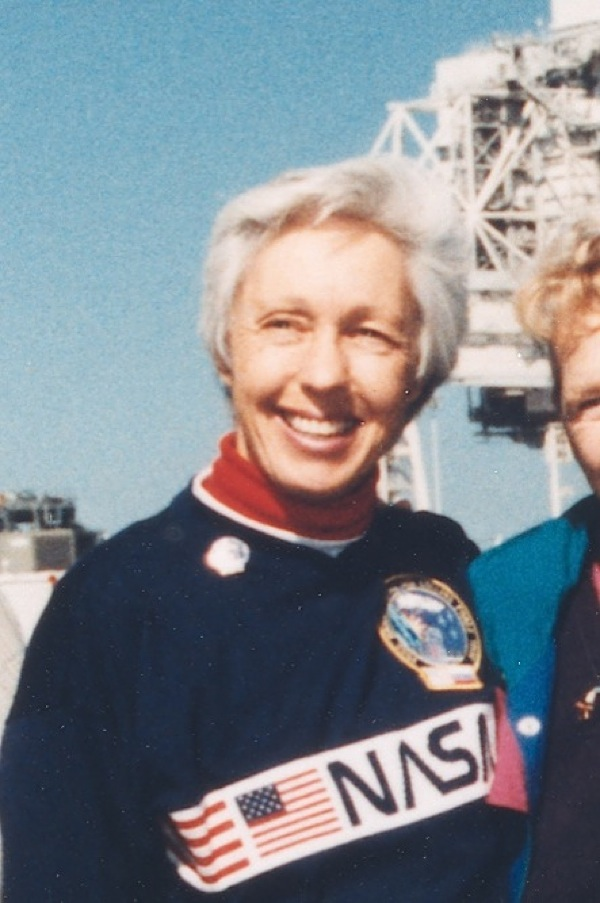
Funk in 1995

In 1974, Funk was hired by the National Transportation Safety Board (NTSB) as its first female Air Safety Investigator. Funk investigated 450 accidents, ranging from a probable mob hit to a fatal crash at a mortuary. She made the discovery that people who die in small-plane crashes often have their jewelry, shoes, and clothes stripped off by the impact. Funk was featured in the Mayday episode "Blind Spot" concerning the crash of Pacific Southwest Airlines Flight 182 in 1978 over San Diego.

Concurrently, Funk participated in many air races. She placed eighth in the Powder Puff Derby's 25th Annual Race, sixth in the Pacific Air Race, and eighth in the Palms to Pines Air Race. On August 16, 1975, she placed second in the Palms to Pines All Women Air Race from Santa Monica, California, to Independence, Oregon. On October 4, 1975, flying her red and white Citabria, Funk won the Pacific Air Race from San Diego, California, to Santa Rosa, California, against 80 participating competitors.

Funk retired from her post as an Air Safety Investigator in 1985 after serving for 11 years. Funk was then appointed an FAA Safety Counselor and became a renowned pilot trainer and speaker on aviation safety. In 1986, she was the key speaker for the U.S. at The World Aviation Education and Safety Congress. In 1987, Funk was appointed Chief Pilot at Emery Aviation College, Greeley, Colorado, overseeing the entire flight programs for 100 students from Private to Multi-engine flight Instructor and Helicopter ratings.

Funk was chief pilot for five aviation schools across the country. As a professional Flight Instructor she soloed more than 700 students and put through 3,000 Private, Commercial, Multi-engine, Seaplane, Glider, Instrument, CFI, Al, and Air Transport Pilots.

== Space career ==
=== Mercury 13 ===
In February 1961, Funk volunteered for the "Women in Space" Program. The program was run by William Randolph Lovelace, although it lacked official government sponsorship. Funk contacted Lovelace and detailed her experience and achievements. Despite having been younger than the recruiting age range of 25–40, Funk was invited to take part. Twenty-five women were invited, nineteen enrolled, and thirteen graduated, including Funk, who at 21 was the youngest. On some tests, she scored better than John Glenn. The media dubbed the group the "Mercury 13", a reference to the Mercury 7.

Like the other participants in the program, Funk was put through rigorous physical and mental testing. In one test, volunteers were placed in sensory deprivation tanks. Funk was in the tank, without hallucinating, for 10 hours and 35 minutes, a record. She passed her tests and was qualified to go into space. Her score was the third best in the Mercury 13 program. Despite this, the program was canceled before the women were to undergo their last test.

After the Mercury 13 program was canceled, Funk became a goodwill ambassador.

=== Later career ===
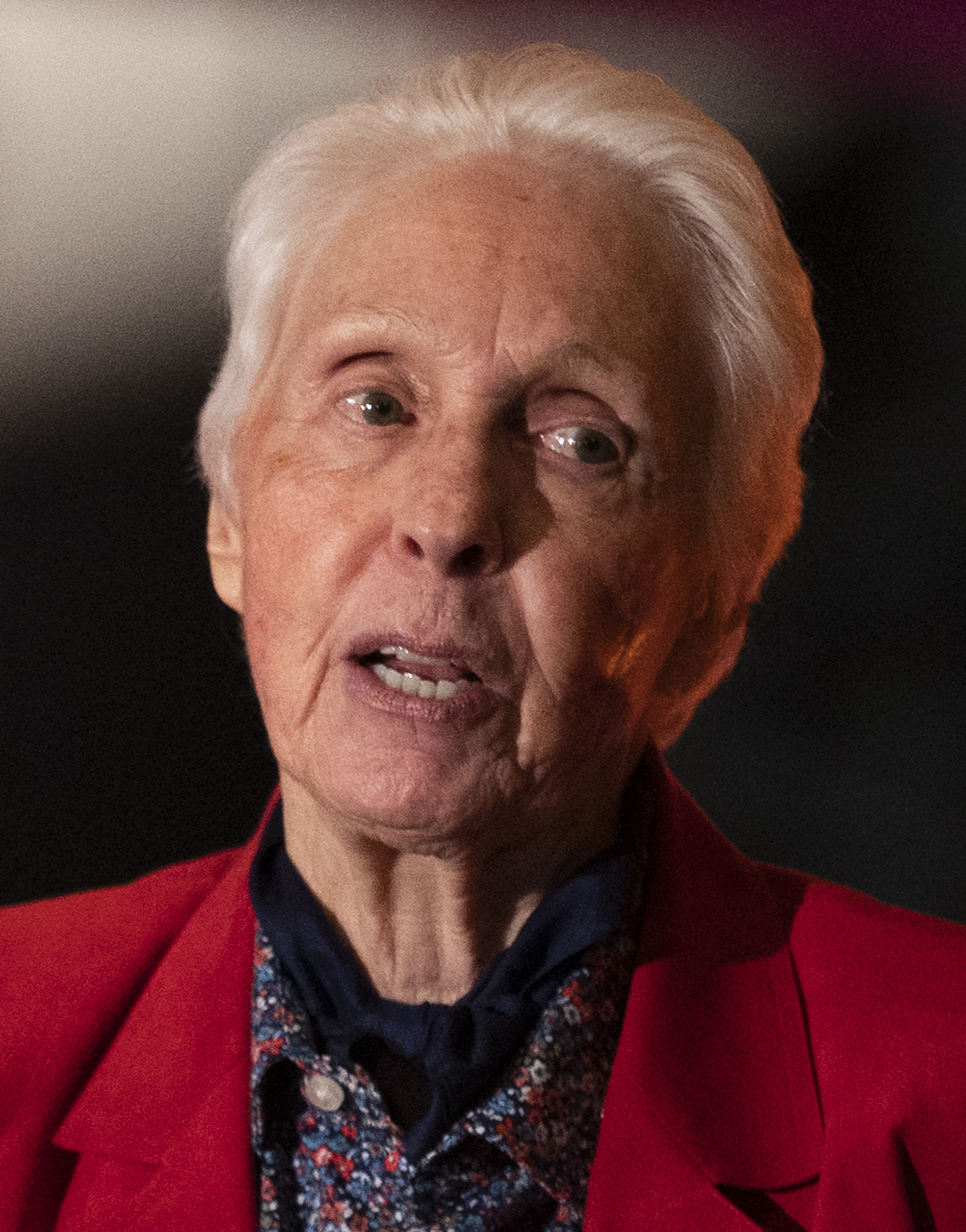
Funk in 2022

Funk continued to dream of going to space. When NASA finally began accepting women in the late 1970s, Funk applied three times. Despite her credentials, she was turned down for not having an engineering degree or a background as a test pilot.

In 1995, Lt. Col. Eileen Collins became the first woman to pilot a Space Shuttle into space; Funk was too old to qualify to become a Space Shuttle pilot by the time Collins became one. Funk and six other members of the Mercury 13 were invited guests of Collins at the launch, and NASA gave them a behind-the-scenes VIP tour of the Kennedy Space Center complex.

In 2012, she put money down to be one of the first people to fly into space via Virgin Galactic. The money for the flight came from Funk's own book and film royalties and family money.

In July 2020 Funk published a memoir, Higher Faster Longer – My Life in Aviation and My Quest for Space Flight with author Loretta Hall.

=== 2021 suborbital space flight ===
On July 1, 2021, Blue Origin announced that Funk would fly as one of four passengers on the first New Shepard flight on July 20, 2021. The flight included Jeff Bezos, his brother Mark, and 18-year-old Oliver Daemen from the Netherlands, who became the youngest ever person in space during the flight. Funk, at age 82, became the oldest person to fly to space, exceeding John Glenn's record at the age of 77 in 1998 aboard STS-95. Her record was surpassed later that year by William Shatner, who flew aboard Blue Origin NS-18 at the age of 90.

== Personal life and death ==
Funk lived in Grapevine, Texas. She enjoyed sports and restoring antique automobiles, with a collection that included a 1951 Hooper Silver Wraith. She had over 18,600 flight hours, and as of June 2019 flew each Saturday as an instructor.

Wally Funk died at her home in Grapevine, on July 8, 2026, at the age of 87.

== In popular culture ==
- The Flight of Wally Funk is a 2001 album by Australian rock band Spiderbait. It peaked at number 34 on the ARIA charts.
- Wally Funk is the title of the 11th track on Pleasure Seekers, the 2022 album by The Electric Swing Circus.

== Awards and honors ==
- In 1964, Funk became the youngest woman in the history of Stephens College to receive the Alumna Achievement Award, honored in recognition for her work in aviation.
- In 1965, Funk was selected as one of the Outstanding Young Women in America, "in recognition of her outstanding ability, accomplishments and service to her community, country and profession".
- In 2012, she filmed her life story for the Traveling Space Museum.
- In 2017, Wally Funk's name was inscribed on the Smithsonian National Air and Space Museum's Wall of Honor "in recognition of your contribution to our aviation and exploration heritage".
- In 2022, Funk was awarded the R.A."Bob" Hoover trophy by the Aircraft Owners and Pilots Association, for exhibiting “the airmanship, leadership, mentorship, and passion for aviation” that Hoover exemplified, as well as for having a “distinguished career as a pilot and aviation advocate while also serving as a source of inspiration and encouragement for current and prospective aviators.”
- Also in 2022, the Smithsonian's National Air and Space Museum awarded its Michael Collins Trophy to Funk for Lifetime Achievement.
- Funk is listed in Who's Who in Aviation.
