= Oliver Daemen =

Dutch space tourist

- Born: 20 August 2002 (age 23); Oisterwijk, Netherlands
- Known for: Being the youngest person to fly in space
- Space career

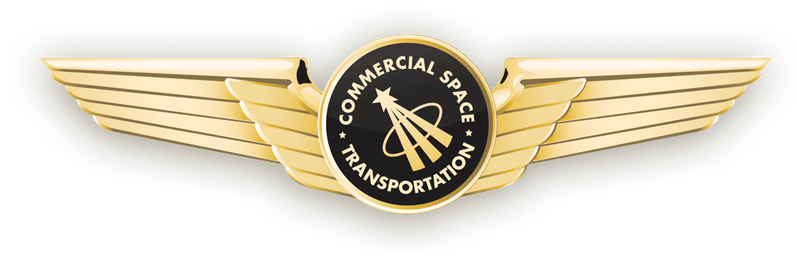
Space Tourist
- Flight time: 10m 18s
- Selection: Blue Origin 2021
- Missions: NS-16

Oliver Daemen (born 20 August 2002) is a Dutch space tourist who flew as part of the 20 July 2021, sub-orbital Blue Origin NS-16 spaceflight. At the time of his flight he was 18 years old, and became the youngest person and first person born in the 21st century to travel to space. He is a licensed pilot.

== Life and career ==
Oliver was born in Oisterwijk, North Brabant, Netherlands. He attended the Odulphuslyceum in Tilburg and obtained his high school diploma in 2020. He is enrolled at Utrecht University where he started his studies in Science and Innovation Management in September 2021. Oliver's father, Joes Daemen is a CEO of Somerset Capital Partners, a private equity firm in the Netherlands.

Olivers's space tourist seat on the New Shepard rocket was secured through an auction, making him Blue Origin's first customer (i.e. a person whose flight was not paid for by Blue Origin) and the 8th person to privately fund their non-professional spaceflight. Initially, cryptocurrency entrepreneur Justin Sun (who at the time remained anonymous) won the auction with a $28 million bid for the one available seat on NS-16. However, Blue Origin said Sun could not make the flight "due to scheduling conflicts". Oliver's father, Joes Daemen "had secured a seat on the second flight," said a Blue Origin spokesperson, and when Justin Sun backed out, Daemen's seat was "moved up,"

On 20 July 2021, Oliver at 18 became the youngest person to take sub-orbital first fully automated spaceflight with civilian passengers of approximately 10 minutes in duration reaching apogee 107 km (66 mi).

== See also ==
- Private spaceflight
- Anastatia Mayers
