= Corn Ranch =

Spaceport operated by Blue Origin

Launch Site One (LS1)
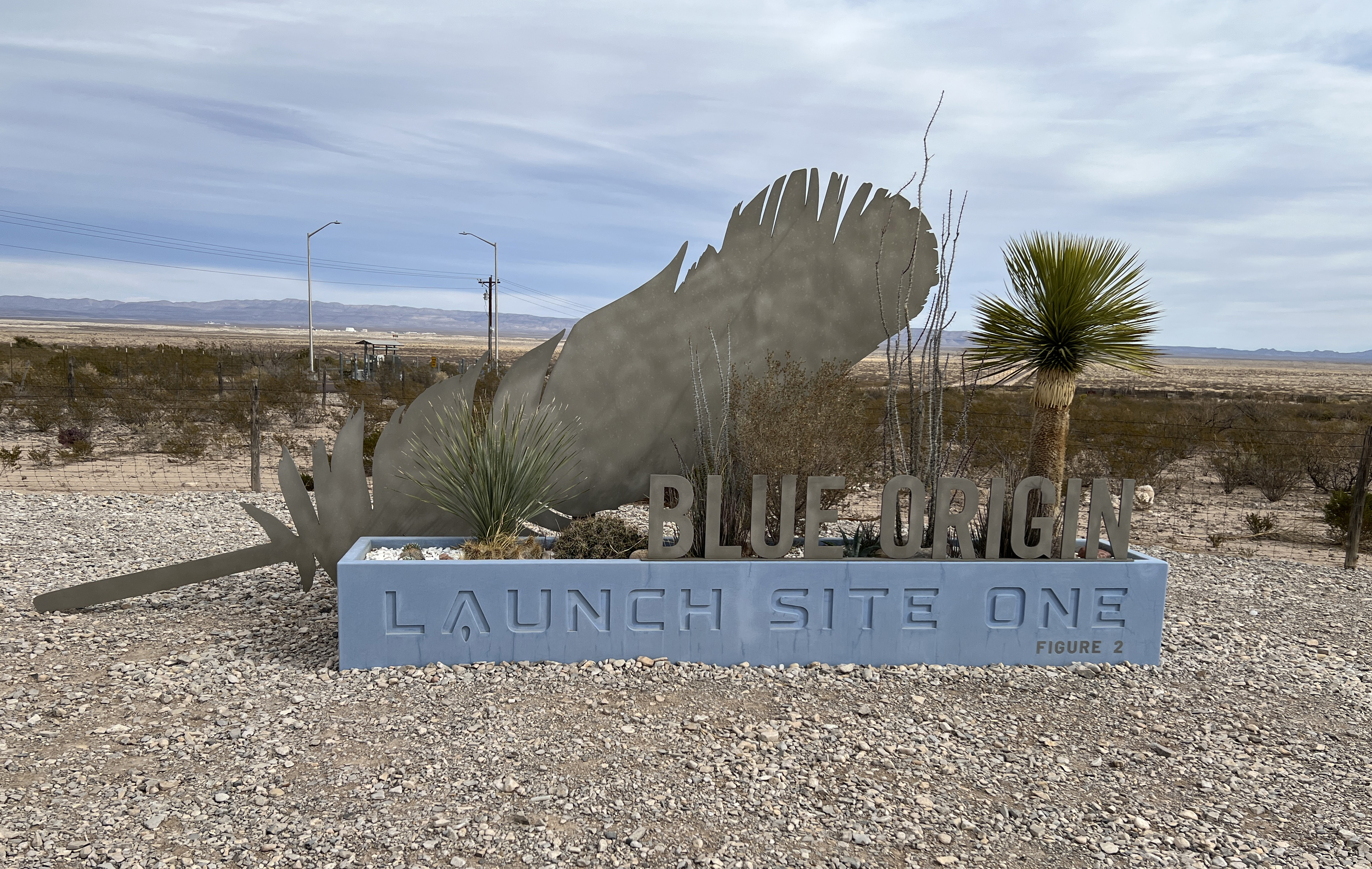
- Entrance to Launch Site One
- Interactive map of Launch Site One (LS1)
- Location: Van Horn, Texas, United States
- Established: 2004; 22 years ago
- Operator: Blue Origin
Launch history
- Status: Paused
- Launches: 41
- First launch: 13 November 2006; Blue Origin Goddard
- Last launch: 22 January 2026; Blue Origin NS-38
- Associated rockets: New Shepard (active)
Landing history
- Status: Active
- Landings: 39
- First landing: 13 November 2006; Blue Origin Goddard
- Last landing: 22 January 2026; Blue Origin NS-38
- Associated rockets: New Shepard (active)

Corn Ranch, commonly referred to as Launch Site One (LSO), is a spaceport owned and operated by Blue Origin which is located approximately 30 miles (48 km) north of the town of Van Horn, Texas, United States.

== History ==
The 165,000-acre (670 km^{2}) plot of land was purchased by Jeff Bezos in 2004.

The company uses the spaceport for testing and launch services for its New Shepard rocket. The launch site has a sub-orbital launch pad and also has a number of rocket engine test stands. The engine test cells are at the site to support the hydrolox, methalox and storable propellant engines that are used. There are three test cells for testing the methalox BE-4 engine, two of which support full-thrust and full-duration burns, and one that supports short-duration, high-pressure preburner tests. The spaceport also includes a vehicle processing facility and an astronaut training facility.

The company's first human spaceflight launched from Launch Site One (LS1) on July 20, 2021. The flight, dubbed NS-16, carried its founder Jeff Bezos, his brother Mark Bezos, test pilot and Mercury 13 member Wally Funk, and Dutchman Oliver Daemen on a suborbital flight aboard New Shepard 4.

== FAA launch license information ==
Current launch license and experimental permits from the US government Federal Aviation Administration authorize flights of New Shepard rockets. The site became active on November 13, 2006 with the goal of providing commercial tourist flights to space.

== Location ==
The launch pad is located at 31.422927°N 104.757152°W, about 1.8 mi (2.9 km) north of the check-out building. The landing pad is located at 31.4517°N 104.7628°W, about 3.8 mi (6.1 km) north of a check-out building and 2 mi (3.2 km) north of the launch pad.
