= LPV =

LPV is an acronym that may refer to:

== Groups, organizations ==
- Leaders Party of Vanuatu, a political party in Vanuatu
- Latvia First (LPV; Latvian: Latvija pirmajā vietā), a political party in Latvia
- Landschaftspflegeverband (LPV; German: Landscape Conservation Association), a German group for landscape-scale conservation
- Lycée Paul Valéry (disambiguation), which may refer to several French schools

== Transport and vehicular ==
- Localizer performance with vertical guidance, aviation
- Air Alps (ICAO airline code LPV), defunct Austrian airline
- Lunar piloted vehicle, space exploration
- Blue Origin landing platform vessels, the rocket landing vessels of Blue Origin
  - Landing Platform Vessel 1, a barge used by Blue Origin for planned rocket landings of New Glenn booster stages, beginning in 2025
  - Blue Origin LPV, the ship registry name for the Blue Origin landing platform ship from 2018 to 2020 (renamed 2020, scrapped 2022)
- Lough Patrol Vessel, a British Royal Marines vessel type; see HMS Sabre (P285)

== Science, engineering, technology ==
- Limiting pressure velocity, a term relating to tribology (the study of friction and wear)
- Long-period variable star, astronomy
- Low-pressure valve, plumbing
- Linear parameter varying, systems and control
- Light Propagation Volumes, a method for computing Global Illumination in Computer graphics
- Lopinavir (LPV), an anti-viral drug used to treat HIV
- lymphotropic polyomavirus (LPV), a type of Polyomaviridae
- Lunar PlanetVac, an instrument on the Firefly Aerospace Blue Ghost M1

== Other uses ==
- Logopedics Phoniatrics Vocology, a British Voice Association journal
- Limited Preferential Vote, a voting system used in the Politics of Papua New Guinea

== See also ==
- "LPV/r" refers to the HIV drug Lopinavir/Ritonavir (trade names: Kaletra / Aluvia)
- Blue Origin Landing Platform Vessel 1 (LPV-1), a landing platform barge for rockets
- LP5 (disambiguation)
