= List of New Glenn boosters =

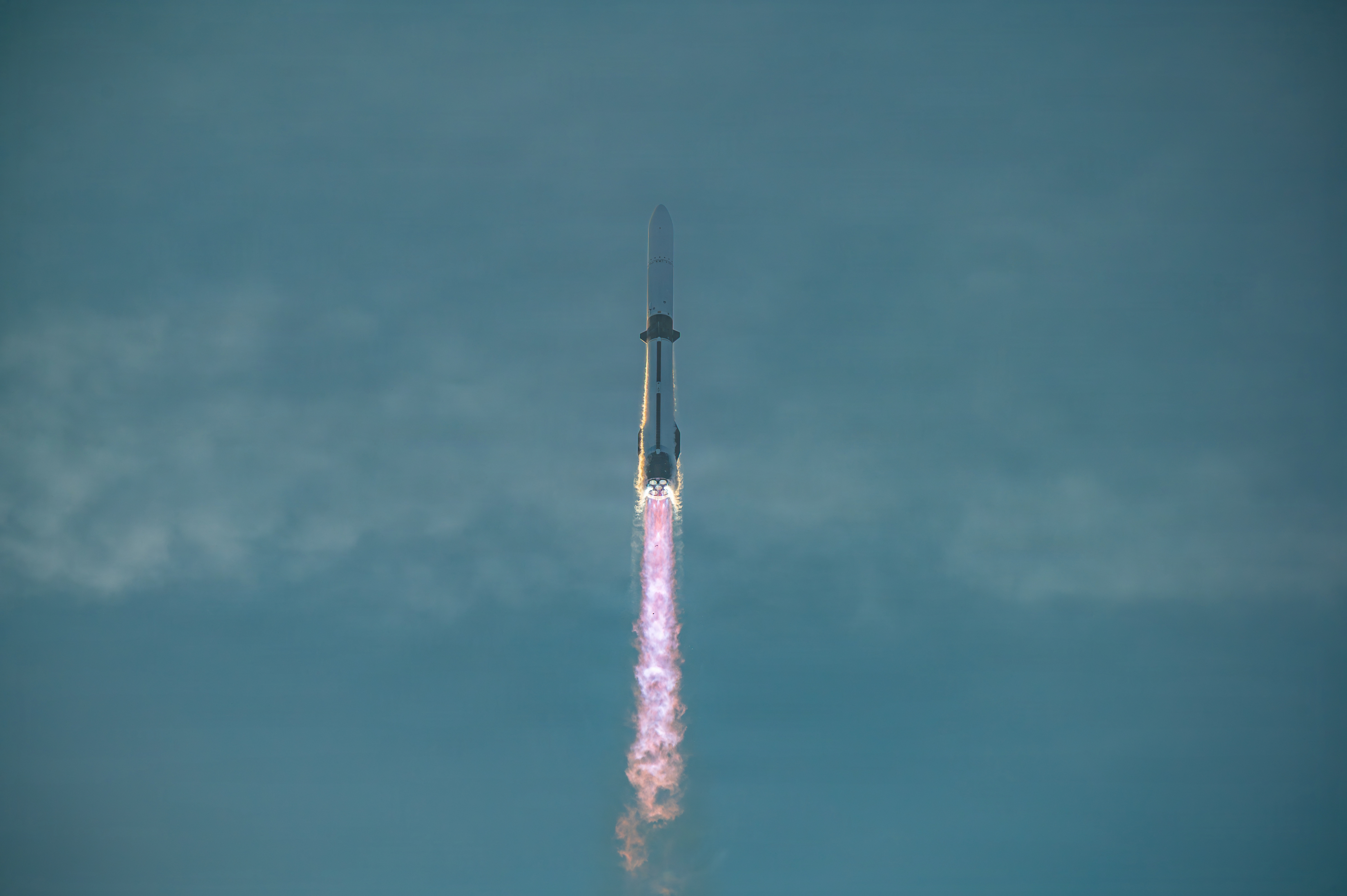
Booster 2 Never Tell Me The Odds sending BlueBird 7 into space.

New Glenn's first stage, Glenn Stage 1 or GS1, is designed to be reusable for a minimum of 25 flights, and lands vertically, a technology previously developed by Blue Origin and tested in 2015–2016 on its New Shepard suborbital launch vehicle.

The GS1 stands 57.5 m (189 ft) tall, and is 7 m (23 ft) across. The second stage (GS2), which is 26.6 m (87 ft) tall and is also 7 m (23 ft) across. GS2 is expendable. Both stages use orthogrid aluminum tanks with welded aluminum domes and common bulkheads, as well as autogenous pressurization.

The first stage is powered by seven BE-4 methane/oxygen engines—designed and manufactured by Blue Origin—producing 17,000 kN (3,800,000 lb_{f}) of liftoff thrust. The BE-4 engines are arranged with one in the center, and an external ring of the remaining six. The center BE-4 and two opposing engines from the outer ring (the engines in line with the strakes) can gimbal and relight for reentry and landing burns.

The New Glenn second stage is powered by two restart BE-3U vacuum optimized engines, also designed and manufactured by Blue Origin, using hydrogen/oxygen as propellants.

The GS1 first flew on the first New Glenn flight, NG-1. The booster on this flight, GS1-1, failed during the entry burn. The first time a GS1 propulsively landed was on NG-2, with GS1-2. GS1-2 was reused and reflown on NG-3. GS1-3, at the time fully completed and flight worthy, exploded during a pre-flight static fire and was lost.

== Booster landings ==
- LPV failure
- LPV success
- No attempt

== List of boosters ==
Booster	Launches	Launch date	Flight No. (Note: Entries with mint colored background denote flights using new boosters.)	Turnaround time	Payload	Launch outcome (pad)	Landing (location)	Status
GS1-1; So You're Telling Me There's a Chance	1	January 16, 2025	NG-1	—N/a	Blue Ring Pathfinder	Success (LC-36)	Failure (Jacklyn)	Destroyed
GS1-2; Never Tell Me The Odds	2	November 13, 2025	NG-2	—N/a	ESCAPADE (Blue & Gold)	Success (LC-36)	Success (Jacklyn)	In storage
GS1-2; Never Tell Me The Odds	2	April 19, 2026	NG-3	157 days	BlueBird 7	Failure (LC-36)	Success (Jacklyn)	In storage
GS1-3; No, It's Necessary	0	—N/a	—N/a	—N/a	LeoSat × 48 (LN‑01)	Pre-flight failure (LC-36)	—N/a	Destroyed
GS1-4	—	TBA	NG-x	—N/a	?	Planned	TBA	Under construction
GS1-5	—	TBA	NG-x	—N/a	?	Planned	TBA	Under construction

== See also ==
- List of New Glenn launches
