= List of New Glenn launches =

New Glenn is a heavy-lift launch vehicle developed by Blue Origin, named after NASA astronaut John Glenn, the first American astronaut to orbit the Earth. It flew to space on its maiden flight on January 16, 2025.

== Statistics ==
=== Rocket configurations ===
- New
- Reused booster

=== Launch outcomes ===
- Success
- Partial failure
- Failure
- Planned

=== Booster landings ===
- LPV failure
- LPV success
- No attempt

== Past launches ==
=== 2025 ===
Flight No.	Date and time (UTC)	Booster (Note: The final number of the string indicates the flight count. For example, GS1-2‑1 and GS1-2‑2 represent the first and second flights of booster GS1-2, Never Tell Me The Odds. Boosters without this suffix were expended on their first flight. Additionally, missions where boosters are making their first flight are shown with a mint-colored background.)	Launch site	Payload	Payload mass	Orbit	Customer	Launch outcome	Booster landing
NG-1	January 16, 2025; 07:03	GS1-1; So You're Telling Me There's a Chance	Cape Canaveral, LC‑36A	Blue Ring Pathfinder	Unknown	MEO	Blue Origin	Success	Failure (Jacklyn)
NG-1	Maiden/demonstration flight of New Glenn, carrying the Blue Ring Pathfinder. First of four National Security Space Launch demonstration flights for New Glenn. The January 13 launch attempt was scrubbed due to problems with the rocket. The second stage with non-separable payload was inserted into a 2,400 km (1,500 mi; 1,300 nmi) × 19,300 km (12,000 mi; 10,400 nmi) medium Earth orbit at an inclination of 30°. The first stage was lost and failed to land.								
NG-2	November 13, 2025; 20:55	GS1-2-1; Never Tell Me The Odds	Cape Canaveral, LC‑36A	ESCAPADE (Blue & Gold)	1,070 kg (2,360 lb)	Sun-Earth L_{2} to Areocentric	NASA	Success	Success (Jacklyn)
NG-2	Second of four National Security Space Launch demonstration flights for New Glenn, carrying the ESCAPADE (Escape and Plasma Acceleration and Dynamics Explorers) mission for NASA as part of their low-cost SIMPLEx program, aiming to investigate Mars' magnetosphere and a technology demonstration payload named Viasat InRange for Viasat. New Glenn deployed two spacecraft to a loiter orbit around the Earth-Sun L_{2} Lagrange point. The upper stage was placed into a heliocentric disposal orbit. NASA paid Blue Origin about $20 million for the launch. Delayed from October 13, 2024; ESCAPADE was originally intended to be launched on the debut flight of New Glenn. A launch attempt on November 9, 2025, was scrubbed due to weather conditions, with a future launch date scheduled for November 12. This was delayed a day further due to a solar storm. First successful first stage landing for New Glenn.								

=== 2026 ===
Flight No.	Date and time (UTC)	Booster	Launch site	Payload	Payload mass	Orbit	Customer	Launch outcome	Booster landing
NG-3	April 19, 2026 11:25	GS1-2-2; Never Tell Me The Odds	Cape Canaveral, LC‑36A	BlueBird 7	6,100 kg (13,400 lb)	LEO	AST SpaceMobile	Failure	Success (Jacklyn)
NG-3	First mission for a commercial customer. First launch of an AST SpaceMobile Block 2 BlueBird satellite on New Glenn to expand cellular broadband satellite constellation. Multi-launch contract was signed in November 2024. First launch of a reused New Glenn first stage, previously flying on ESCAPADE in November 2025. The satellite was intended to be deployed to a 460 km (290 mi; 250 nmi) low Earth orbit at an inclination of 49.4°. Due to an issue with the second stage, the satellite was left in an off-nominal 265 km (165 mi; 143 nmi) × 465 km (289 mi; 251 nmi) × 43° orbit, too low to sustain operations, forcing it to be de-orbited. In response, the Federal Aviation Administration grounded New Glenn and required a mishap investigation. On May 22, the FAA cleared New Glenn to return to service.								

== Future launches ==
Launches are expected to take place "no earlier than" (NET) the listed date.

=== 2027 ===
Date and time (UTC)	Booster	Launch site	Payload	Payload mass	Orbit	Customer
January 2027	Unknown	Cape Canaveral, LC‑36	Blue Ring 1 (BR-1)	Unknown	LEO	Blue Origin
January 2027	Return-to-flight mission after the on-pad explosion in May 2026. First flight of Blue Ring, Blue Origin's maneuverable space vehicle. The spacecraft will be deployed to a 400 km (250 mi; 220 nmi) × 45,000 km (28,000 mi; 24,000 nmi) × 28.5° elliptical Earth orbit, designated Demonstration Orbit 0 (DO-0).					
Q1 2027	Unknown	Cape Canaveral, LC‑36	BlueBird Block 2 × 3	12,600 kg (27,800 lb)	LEO	AST SpaceMobile
Q1 2027	Second launch of AST SpaceMobile Block 2 BlueBird satellites on New Glenn to expand cellular broadband satellite constellation. Multi-launch contract was signed in November 2024. Subsequent launches are expected to carry 6 or 8 satellites.					
Q1 2027	Unknown	Cape Canaveral, LC‑36	LeoSat × 48 (LN‑01)	~27,000 kg (60,000 lb)	LEO	Amazon (Amazon Leo)
Q1 2027	The first set of Amazon Leo (formerly Project Kuiper) satellites to launch on New Glenn was planned for June 4, 2026. However, during a static fire test on May 28, 2026, booster GS1-3 (No, It's Necessary) and an upper stage exploded and were destroyed. The satellites were not on board the vehicle at the time of the explosion.					
Q1 2027	Unknown	Cape Canaveral, LC‑36	Blue Moon MK1-101 (Endurance)	21,715 kg (47,873 lb)	LEO to TLI	NASA (CLPS)
Q1 2027	Will carry a Blue Moon Mark 1 lander, planned to make a landing on the Moon. The lander will be deployed into a 185 km (115 mi; 100 nmi) × 3,300–3,700 km (2,100–2,300 mi; 1,800–2,000 nmi) low Earth orbit with an inclination of 28.5–51.6°, before the spacecraft propels itself with a trans-lunar injection (TLI) burn. During the mission Blue Moon will carry the Stereo Cameras for Lunar Plume Surface Studies (SCALPSS) and the Laser Retroreflective Array (LRA), as part of a task order from NASA's Commercial Lunar Payload Services (CLPS) program, awarded in July 2024.					
Q2 2027	Unknown	Cape Canaveral, LC‑36	Blue Moon MK2-D	Unknown	LEO	NASA (Artemis)
Q2 2027	Artemis III will include a rendezvous and docking of Orion and the Blue Moon Earth Orbit Rendezvous Demonstration Vehicle, also known as the MK2-D. The mission will execute in-space tests of the docked vehicles, integrated checkout of life support, communications, and propulsion systems, as well as tests of the new Extravehicular Activity (xEVA) suits.					
2027	Unknown	Cape Canaveral, LC‑36	LeoSat × 48 (LN‑02)	Unknown	LEO	Amazon (Amazon Leo)
2027	Second launch of Amazon Leo (formerly Project Kuiper) satellites on New Glenn to expand LEO internet constellation. Amazon Leo was also founded by Blue Origin founder Jeff Bezos; however, the two companies are not directly connected. Initial launches of Amazon Leo on New Glenn will carry 48 satellites, with payload sizes expected to increase over time as vehicle performance is improved.					
Q4 2027	Unknown	Unknown	NRO Task Order-4	Unknown	Unknown	NRO (NSSL)
Q4 2027	First National Security Space Launch (NSSL) Phase 3 Lane 1 task order for New Glenn, providing for one launch of a mission set for the NRO to be completed between Q4 2027 and Q1 2028. New Glenn was previously onboarded to the Phase 3 Lane 1 program in June 2024.					
Q4 2027	Unknown	Cape Canaveral, LC‑36	Blue Moon MK1-102 (VIPER)	Unknown	TLI	NASA (CLPS)
Q4 2027	Will carry the VIPER rover, which was previously cancelled in 2024.					

=== 2028 ===
Date and time (UTC)	Booster	Launch site	Payload	Payload mass	Orbit	Customer
Q1 2028	Unknown	Cape Canaveral, LC‑36	Blue Moon MK1-103 (LTV)	Unknown	TLI	NASA (CLPS)
Q1 2028	Will carry a lunar terrain vehicle (LTV) from Astrolab or Lunar Outpost.					
Q1 2028	Unknown	Cape Canaveral, LC‑36	Blue Moon Mark 2 Lander	Unknown	LEO	NASA (Artemis)
Q1 2028	Sustaining HLS uncrewed lunar demo for Artemis.					
2028	Unknown	Cape Canaveral, LC‑36	Blue Moon MK1-104 (LTV)	Unknown	TLI	NASA (CLPS)
2028	Will carry a lunar terrain vehicle (LTV) from Astrolab or Lunar Outpost.					
Q4 2028	Unknown	Cape Canaveral, LC‑36	Firefly Elytra / MoonFall	Unknown	Unknown	NASA (CLPS)
Q4 2028	Launch of the Firefly Elytra orbital transfer vehicle, carrying propulsive drones built by JPL as part of NASA's MoonFall mission.					
Q4 2028	Unknown	Cape Canaveral, LC‑36	Blue Moon MK1-105 (PROMISE)	Unknown	Unknown	NASA (CLPS)
Q4 2028	Launch of the fifth Blue Moon MK1 cargo lander, carrying NASA's Polar Rover for Observation, Mapping, and In-Situ Exploration, or PROMISE.					
Q4 2028	Unknown	Cape Canaveral, LC‑36	Unknown	Unknown	Unknown	U.S. Space Force
Q4 2028	Blue Origin, as the Requirement 3 provider is projected to be awarded seven NSSL Phase 3 Lane 2 missions starting in Order Year 3 (FY 2027). With a nominal two-year integration period, these missions would launch no earlier than FY 2029.					

=== 2029 and beyond ===
Date and time (UTC)	Booster	Launch site	Payload	Payload mass	Orbit	Customer
Q1 2029	Unknown	Cape Canaveral, LC‑36	Project Suncatcher	Unknown	SSO	Google
Q1 2029	Google’s first dedicated heavy-lift launch for Project Suncatcher, deploying satellites equipped with Tensor Processing Units (TPUs) for AI compute capacity.					
2033	Unknown	Cape Canaveral, LC‑36	Blue Moon Mark 2 Lander	Unknown	Unknown	NASA (Artemis)
2033	The agency expects Blue Origin to deliver a lunar surface habitat no earlier than fiscal year 2033 using a cargo version of its crewed human lander.					
TBD	Unknown	Cape Canaveral, LC‑36	Blue Ring	Unknown	Unknown	NASA (VADR)
TBD	Launch of a Blue Ring spacecraft, carrying a lunar lander or another payload intended for NASA's Moon Base. First of two launches awarded in November 2026 as part of NASA's Venture-Class Acquisition of Dedicated and Rideshare (VADR) program.					
TBD	Unknown	Cape Canaveral, LC‑36	Blue Ring	Unknown	Unknown	NASA (VADR)
TBD	Launch of a Blue Ring spacecraft, carrying a lunar lander or another payload intended for NASA's Moon Base. Second of two launches awarded in November 2026 as part of NASA's Venture-Class Acquisition of Dedicated and Rideshare (VADR) program.					
TBD	Unknown	Cape Canaveral, LC‑36	Blue Moon Mark 2 Lander	Unknown	LEO	NASA (Artemis)
TBD	Sustaining HLS crewed lunar demo for Artemis. Originally intended for Artemis V, the Artemis IV landing was opened to whichever lander was ready first, as part of NASA's efforts to accelerate the program.					
TBD	Unknown	Cape Canaveral, LC‑36	Unknown	Unknown	Unknown	Eutelsat
TBD	Eutelsat now says it has no specific launch date slated for New Glenn, stating: "New Glenn is part of our portfolio of launch options and will be activated based on our future needs taking into consideration industry conditions at the time. Our launch contract with Blue Origin for a Eutelsat unspecified satellite on a New Glenn rocket is still current. It will help to diversify options for access to space."					
TBD	Unknown	Cape Canaveral, LC‑36	Unknown	Unknown	Unknown	Telesat
TBD	Telesat signed a multi-launch agreement with Blue Origin in 2019 for deployment of their LEO constellation. As of 2023, no specific launches under the agreement had been announced, although Telesat continues to retain launch optionality on New Glenn.					

== See also ==
- List of New Glenn boosters
