= Freightliner =

Freightliner may refer to:

- Freightliner Trucks, a heavy vehicle brand of Daimler AG
- Freightliner Group, a European rail-freight operator
- Freight liner (ship), describing a cargo ship operating to a repeating schedule

== See also ==
- Freight
- Freighter (disambiguation)
- Liner (disambiguation)
