= Blue Origin landing platform =

Blue Origin landing platform may refer to:

- Jacklyn (ship) a.k.a. "LPV" and "Landing Platform Vessel", a ship purchased by Blue Origin in 2018 to use as a landing platform ship that was scrapped in 2022
- Landing Platform Vessel 1, a.k.a. "Jacklyn" and "LPV1", a barge which was manufactured for Blue Origin in 2024 for use as a landing platform for the booster stages of New Glenn
