= Blue Origin facilities =

Facilities

The private aerospace company Blue Origin has a number of development, manufacturing, and test facilities in four US states: Washington, Texas, Florida, and Alabama.

Blue Origin began in 2000 with only a development and office facility near Seattle, Washington. By 2003 Blue Origin was buying land in west Texas for a rocket engine test facility and, subsequently, for a suborbital rocket launch site. Blue Origin is currently developing a new orbital launch facility at Cape Canaveral Space Force Station and a nearby rocket assembly facility in Brevard County, Florida.

== Development facility and headquarters ==
The company is headquartered on 11 hectares (26 acres) of industrial land in Kent, Washington, a suburb of Seattle, where its research and development is located. The facility was 24,000 m^{2} (260,000 ft^{2}) in size in early 2015, growing to 28,000 m^{2} (300,000 ft^{2}) by March 2016 with Blue Origin leasing additional space in adjacent office buildings. As of March 2016, the Kent facility housed engineering, manufacturing and business operations and the majority of the 600-person Blue Origin workforce, which grew from about 350 persons at Kent in May 2015. They added an additional 42,630 m^{2} (458,900 ft^{2}) of office, manufacturing and warehouse space to their headquarters facilities in 2016 and 2017. In late 2017, Blue Origin purchased an additional 13 hectares (31 acres)—adding to their existing 11 hectares (26 acres)—of land on which they plan to build another 32,000 m^{2} (340,000 ft^{2}) of facility in Washington state.

== Florida facilities ==
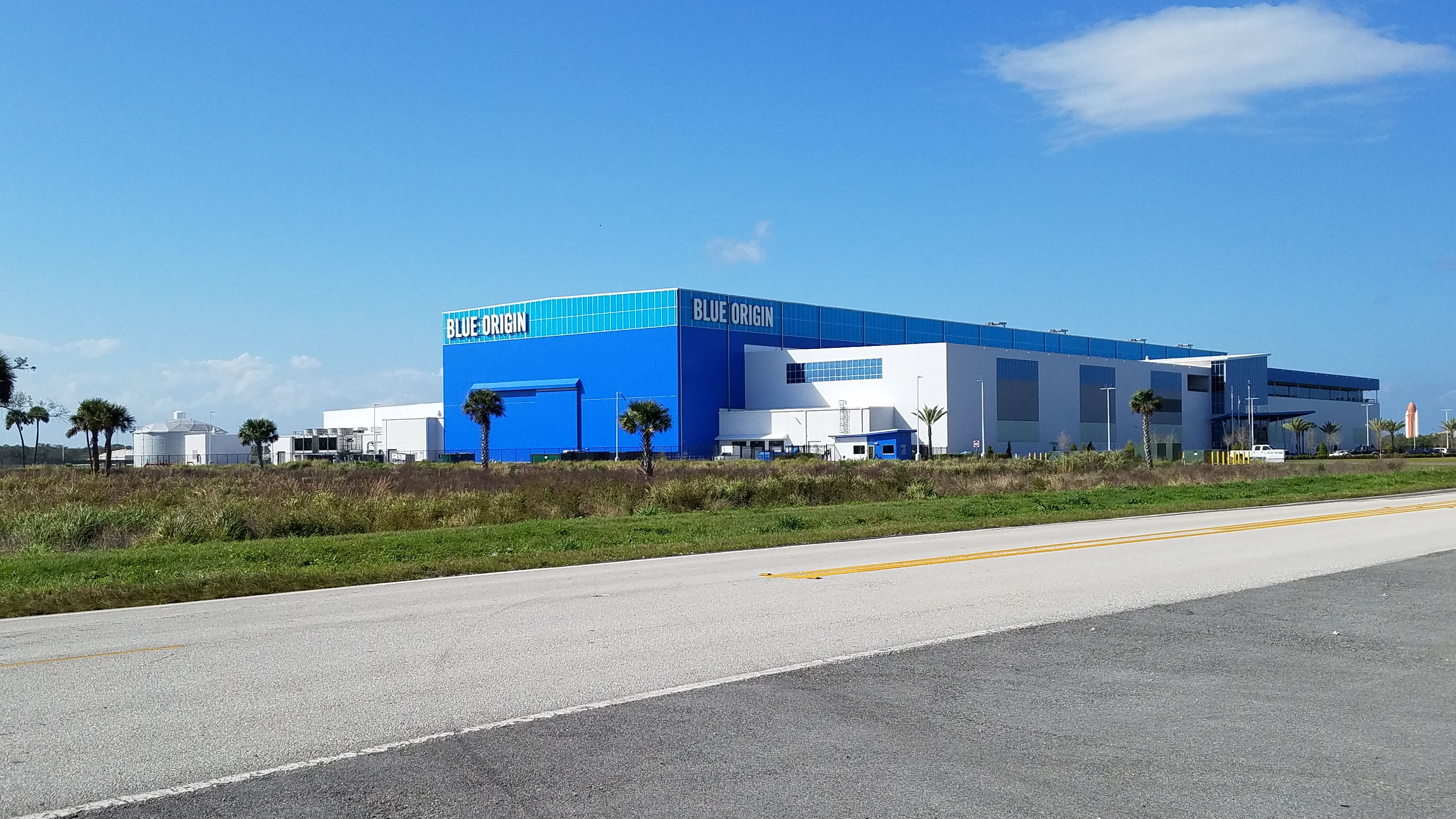
Blue Origin's Orbital Launch Site (OLS) manufacturing facility, 2019

In September 2015, Blue Origin leased Launch Complex 36 (LC-36) in Cape Canaveral, Florida to build a launch pad for their orbital launch vehicle New Glenn. As of March 2016, the first Blue Origin launch from LC36 was planned for 2020. An August 2015 estimate predicted that initial launch happening earlier than 2020. Ground-breaking for the facility to begin construction occurred in June 2016. By March 2018, Blue's construction at LC-36 was lagging, but the company stated they did not think it would delay achieving the anticipated 2020 initial launch of New Glenn. However as of 2022 Blue Origin does not expect to launch New Glenn until 2023 at the earliest. The factory was complete by 2020 and was being used for the construction of New Glenn prototypes by 2021.

The Blue Origin orbital launch site is situated on a total of 306 acres of leased land assembled from former Launch Complexes 11, 36A, and 36B, alongside using the adjacent Launch Complex 12 for storage. The land parcel will be used to build a rocket engine test stand for the BE-4 engine, a launch mount—called the Orbital Launch Site by Blue—and a reusable booster refurbishment facility for the New Glenn launch vehicle, which is expected to land on a seaborne platform and returned to Port Canaveral for refurbishment.

In addition, the manufacturing of "large elements, such as first stages, second stages, payload fairings, etc." will occur at the Blue Origin launch vehicle factory on Space Commerce Parkway in nearby Exploration Park, near the entrance to the Kennedy Space Center Visitor Complex on Merritt Island.

=== Landing platform ship ===
In October 2018, Stena Freighter, 182 meter cargo-ship purchased from ferry operator Stena Line, arrived in Florida from Spain. CEO Bob Smith, confirmed Stena Freighter would be used as the landing platform vessel for first-stage boosters. The landing ship will be hydrodynamically stabilized. In 2024, Blue Origin completed construction on the Jacklyn (LPV1) which remains the only active ship used for landing by New Glenn.

== California facilities ==
Much like numerous other American rockets, Blue Origin has also set out to have New Glenn do polar launches from Vandenberg Space Force Base at Point Arguello, California. Initially, they had their eyes set on Space Launch Complex 6 thanks to the retirement of its previous launching rockets, United Launch Alliance's Delta IV and Delta IV Heavy. However, hopes were dashed in April 2023 when the United States Space Force instead gave SpaceX the pad lease for Falcon Heavy and as a second Falcon 9 site. Instead, as part of an expansion of Vandenberg launch sites by Space Launch Delta 30, Blue Origin plans on building Space Launch Complex 14 (SLC-14) for West Coast New Glenn capabilities.

== Launch Site One suborbital launch and engine test site ==
Blue Origin has a suborbital launch facility known as Launch Site One. It is located in the West Texas region, 25 miles north of the town of Van Horn at 31.451646°+N, -104.762835°+W. Current launch license and experimental permits from the US government Federal Aviation Administration authorize flights of Blue Origin's New Shepard suborbital system. In addition to the suborbital launch pads, the West Texas site includes a number of rocket engine test stands. Engine test cells to support both hydrolox, methalox and storable propellant engines are present.

Included are three test cells just for testing the methalox BE-4 engine alone: two full test cells that can support full-thrust and full-duration burns, as well as one that supports short-duration, high-pressure preburner tests, to "refine the ignition sequence and understand the start transients."

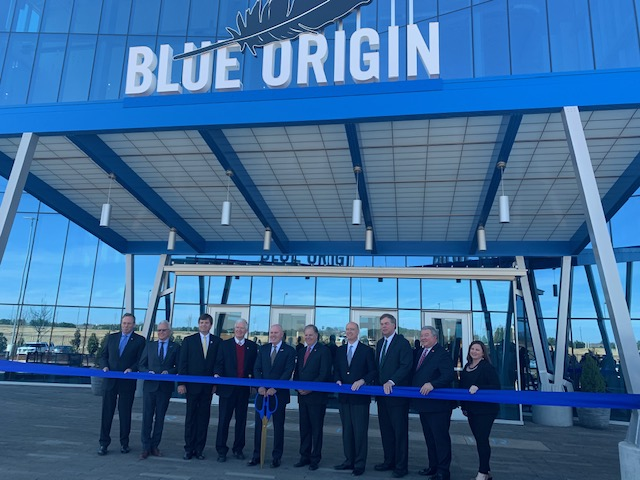
The 2020 ribbon-cutting at the Huntsville facility.

== Alabama engine manufacturing facility ==
In June 2016, Blue Origin president Rob Meyerson announced that they would build a new 600,000sqft facility in Huntsville, Alabama called “Blue Engine” to manufacture the large BE-4 cryogenic rocket engine and the BE-3 engine.These engines will be tested at the NASA Marshall Space Flight Center on the Test Stand 4670.
