= 2026 New Glenn rocket explosion =

Explosion of a New Glenn rocket

- The fireball created by the explosion
- Date: May 28, 2026; 5 months ago
- Time: ~21:00 (UTC−04:00)
- Location: Cape Canaveral Space Force Station, Florida, U.S.; 28.4718°N 80.5381°W
- Type: Explosion
- Outcome: Loss of No, It's Necessary and second stage; Launch Complex 36 severely damaged; New Glenn launch operations suspended pending investigation and repairs

On May 28, 2026, a New Glenn rocket operated by Blue Origin exploded during a static fire test at Cape Canaveral Space Force Station's Launch Complex 36 in Florida, U.S. The explosion destroyed the vehicle and severely damaged Blue Origin's only operational New Glenn launch site. On August 5, it was confirmed that the explosion was caused by one of the rocket's BE-4 engines. The explosion is one of the largest explosions, if not the largest, to have ever occurred on a launchpad, with reports of people being able to see it from up to one hundred miles away recorded.

== Background ==
Following the third flight of New Glenn on April 19, 2026, the Federal Aviation Administration opened an investigation after the rocket's second stage failed to reach its intended orbit. During the mission, the first stage landed successfully on the barge Jacklyn, but the second stage experienced an anomaly that prevented it from reaching its target orbit. Blue Origin was preparing New Glenn's return to flight when the May 28 explosion occurred.

== Incident ==
On May 28, 2026, the third New Glenn first stage booster, named No, It's Necessary, was undergoing a static fire test when it exploded. The explosion was attributed to a main oxidizer valve in one of the first stage's seven BE-4 engines. Believed to be the most powerful rocket explosion since that of the Soviet N1 rocket in 1969, the explosion destroyed the first stage along with the attached and fueled second stage, causing significant damage to Launch Complex 36, Blue Origin's only operational New Glenn launch site. No injuries or fatalities were reported.

== Aftermath ==
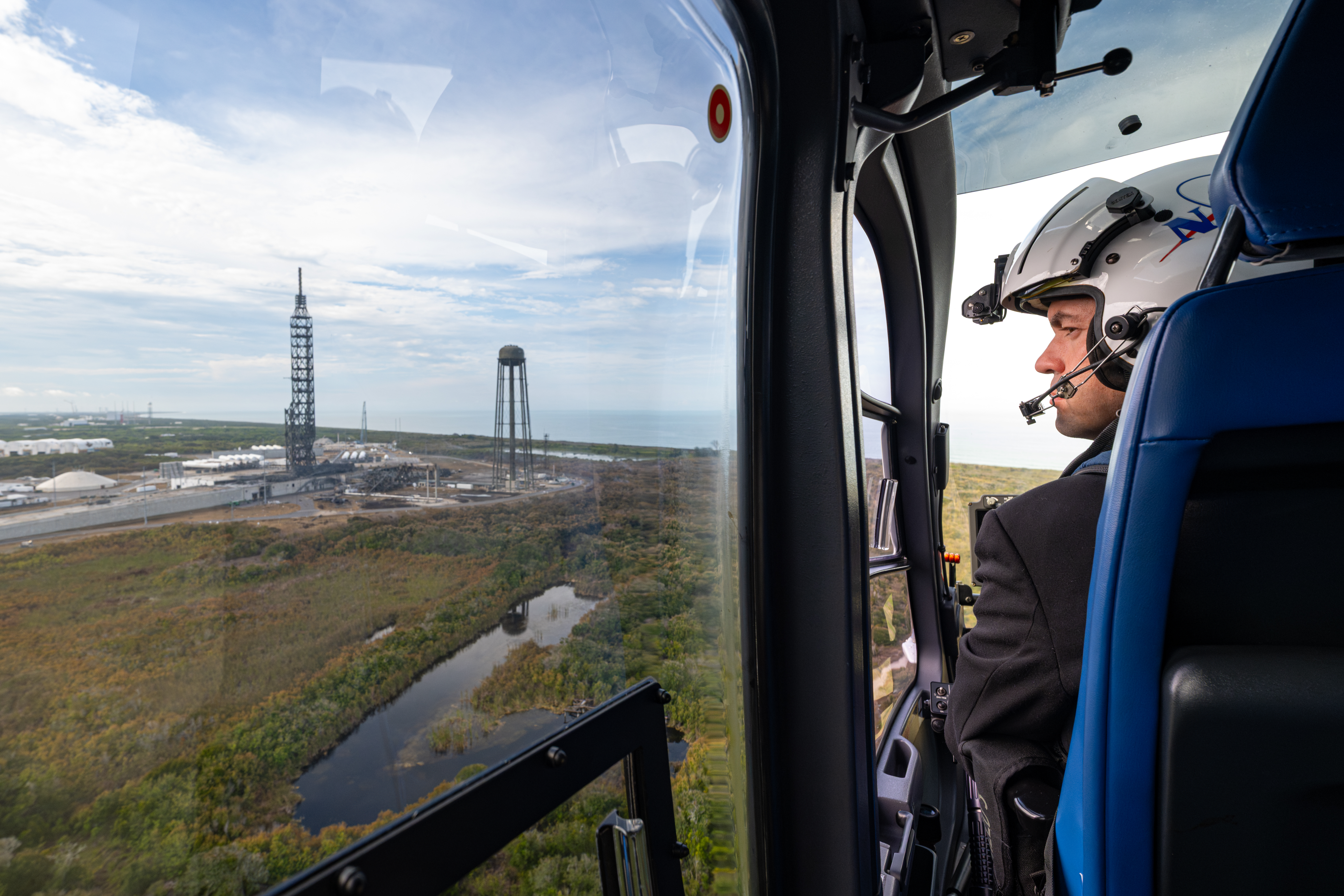
NASA Administrator Jared Isaacman observes the damage to Launch Complex 36 from a helicopter following the New Glenn explosion

The loss of the vehicle and damage to Launch Complex 36 has disrupted Blue Origin's launch schedule. According to industry sources cited by Ars Technica, repairs to the launch complex or completion of an alternative launch facility could take more than a year. Reuters similarly reported that the explosion was expected to delay New Glenn operations for months while repairs and investigations proceeded. Plans for launches that have been affected include those for the Amazon Leo satellite internet constellation, and for the Blue Moon Mark 1 cargo lander and Mark 2 crewed lander, both of which were designed to launch aboard New Glenn and had been selected for several NASA lunar missions. Time reported that the full effect of the incident on future Artemis program lunar missions remains unclear.

On June 1, Blue Origin chief executive Dave Limp said that inspections indicated the damage to Launch Complex 36 was less extensive than initially anticipated. He reported that the propellant storage tanks and water tower had not sustained significant damage, avoiding the need to replace items with long manufacturing lead times, and that the launch tower could be repaired rather than replaced. Limp also said that the first stage, Never Tell Me The Odds, and three second stages stored in the nearby integration facility were undamaged. Because the rocket's transporter-erector had been heavily damaged, Blue Origin would accelerate a previously planned redesign that would replace it with a vertical integration system. Limp said he expected to return to flight before the end of 2026 and that the company would continue producing New Glenn vehicles during the downtime, storing completed stages for future launches. The timeline to return to flight by the end of 2026 has been called very aggressive. Veteran SpaceX employees who dealt with the aftermath of the AMOS-6 explosion said Limp's timeline was unrealistic. On June 25, Dave Limp stated that all debris from the explosion had been cleared from Launch Complex 36. On June 30, Blue Origin said they are looking at plans to redesign the launchpad, also saying they still have no idea what caused the event.

On June 30, Limp stated the "Early analysis [of the anomaly] points to the aft section of the first stage." A few days earlier he had said wreckage had been recovered from the flight pad in nine days. He also said they would change from an entirely horizontal rocket integration model to use some vertical integration to avoid the need for the destroyed transporter-erector. On August 5, it was revealed by Limp that "The anomaly originated at the main oxygen valve on one of the BE-4 engines, which was later confirmed by hardware recovery and inspections." On November 5, Limp announced that New Glenn's return to flight was delayed to January 2027 due to weather.

== Reactions ==
Shortly after the explosion, Jeff Bezos, founder of Blue Origin, stated on X that all personnel had been accounted for and were safe. NASA Administrator Jared Isaacman stated on X that NASA would support the investigation into the explosion and assess any impacts on future missions, including the Artemis program.

He later visited Launch Complex 36 to inspect the damage and speak with Blue Origin employees. In an email to the NASA workforce, Isaacman said the incident could potentially affect NASA's Artemis and Moon Base plans. Elon Musk, chief executive of competitor SpaceX, expressed sympathy, adding, "Sorry to see this" and "Rockets are hard". Replying to the post stating a main oxygen valve led to the explosion, he added "Hope you get back to flight soon".

== See also ==
- List of New Glenn launches
- List of New Glenn boosters
