= Floating launch vehicle operations platform =

Marine vessel for space launch or landing

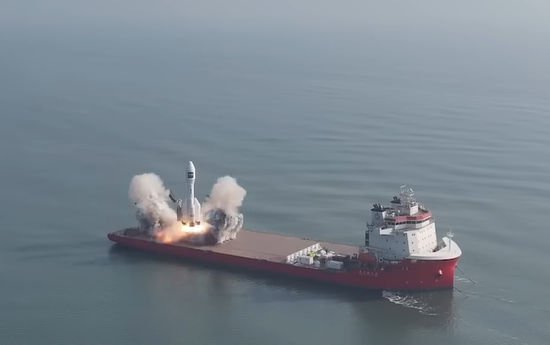
Gravity-1 launch in January 2024

A floating launch vehicle operations platform is a marine vessel used for launch or landing operations of an orbital launch vehicle by a launch service provider: putting satellites into orbit around Earth or another celestial body, or recovering first-stage boosters from orbital-class flights by making a propulsive landing on the platform.

In the early decades of spaceflight technology, all orbital launch vehicle operations were exclusively from land, and all booster stages were expended after a single use for nearly 60 years after the first orbital spaceflight, Sputnik 1. After the late 1990s and into the 2010s, new marine options for launch were built. Landing of orbital-class boosters began to be accomplished in 2015. More platforms, both for launch and landing, are currently in construction or planned.

Suborbital rockets and ballistic missiles had been launched from marine platforms earlier than the 1990s, but are not the topic of this article.

== Platforms to date ==
Both floating launch platform and floating landing platforms have been placed into use by orbital launch service providers as of 2020. Additionally, at least two new rocket landing platforms and one new launch platform are under construction as of 2020.

There are currently at least five instances of marine launch or landing platforms for orbital launch vehicles:

=== Active ===
- Two autonomous spaceport drone ships (ASDS) are used by SpaceX to recover and reuse first-stage boosters of its Falcon rocket family. A Shortfall of Gravitas operates from Port Canaveral supporting launches from Kennedy Space Center and Cape Canaveral Space Force Station landing in the Atlantic Ocean, while Of Course I Still Love You operates from the Port of Long Beach supporting launches from Vandenberg Space Force Base landing in the Pacific Ocean.
- The Government of China launched a solid-rocket propelled smallsat payload massing 350 kg (770 lb) into orbit during 2019 using a 21 m (69 ft)-long repurposed military ballistic missile technology.
- Gravity-1 - Chinese rocket launch from a ship in January 2024.
- Blue Origin utilizes a landing platform barge named Landing Platform Vessel 1 (nicknamed Jacklyn) to attempt to recover the first-stage of their New Glenn rocket.
- The Government of China utilizes a landing platform barge named LingHangZhe (Navigator) wires-based recovery ship to attempt to recover the first-stage of their Long March 10, 10A and 10B rocket.

=== Retired ===
- Odyssey used by Sea Launch for equatorial Pacific Ocean launches of the Zenit-3 rocket from 1999 to 2014, where a total of 36 rocket launches were made.
- SpaceX's first autonomous spaceport drone ships (ASDS) named Just Read the Instructions (I) used in two unsuccessful landing tests in January and April 2015, while Just Read the Instructions (II) used in 157 launches (154 successes, 1 failure, 2 partial failure) between March 2016 and April 2026.

=== Under construction ===
- Xingji Guihang (Chinese: 星际归航; Mandarin Chinese: Interstellar Return), used by i-Space for landing the Hyperbola-3 (SQX-3) first stage. Launched in 2025, yet to become operational. The first stage of the i-Space Hyperbola-3 rocket is expected to land vertically using landing legs to land on the floating platform.

=== Proposed ===
In addition to the historical and current platforms, other entities have considered utilizing a floating landing platform.

- Rocket Lab announced in March 2021 that they are building their new medium-lift launch vehicle—Neutron—to land the first stage booster on an ocean landing platform called, Return On Investment.
- In June 2021, Astra was evaluating ocean launch platforms as part of their company strategy to have more than a dozen launch locations to support a daily smallsat launch cadence by 2025.
- in October 2025, ESA announced plans for a similar vessel for future reusable upper stages.

=== Cancelled ===
- The former Blue Origin landing platform ship, Jacklyn, owned 2018 until the vessel was scrapped in 2022. The ship was never used operationally by Blue Origin.
- SpaceX had planned in 2021 to build two floating launch platforms, Phobos and Deimos for their second-generation Starship system. Two deepwater oil rigs were procured in July 2020, and as of 2021, modifications are underway on the two ships in the Port of Brownsville and Port of Galveston. Plans were for both the first stage (Super Heavy) booster and the second stage (Starship) to be landed on land, unlike the many sea landings seen with their Falcon 9 boosters. However, these plans were shelved and the rigs were sold by SpaceX in 2023.

== History ==
=== Floating launch platforms ===
Orbital launch platforms were initially modified ships, but specific platforms were later produced specifically to be orbital launch vessels.

The concept was pioneered in the late 1990s by a US, Russian, Norwegian and Ukrainian commercial consortium. The Chinese space agency did their first orbital launch from a ship in 2019. It was unclear if the shipboard launch was a special demonstration mission, or if China was putting a new launch service provider capability into place.

=== Floating landing platforms ===
All early orbital launch vehicle stages were expended, the booster stages were destroyed when re-entering the atmosphere or on impact with the ground or ocean. After over four years of research and technology development, SpaceX first landed Falcon 9 boosters on land in 2015, on a floating landing platform in 2016, and has been reusing boosters routinely since 2017, with most of the recovered boosters landing on a platform at sea.

After attempts to land orbital rocket booster stages by parachute failed in the late 2000s, SpaceX began to develop reusable technology in the early 2010s, when they contracted with a Louisiana shipyard to build a floating landing platform to land their launch vehicles. The platform had an approximately 90 by 50 meters (300 ft × 160 ft) landing pad surface and was capable of precision positioning with diesel-powered azimuth thrusters so the platform can hold its position for launch vehicle landing. This platform was first deployed in January 2015 when SpaceX attempted a controlled descent flight test to land the first stage of Falcon 9 flight 14 on a solid surface after it was used to loft a contracted payload toward Earth orbit. The platform utilizes GPS position information to navigate and hold its precise position. The rocket landing leg span is 18 m (60 ft) and must not only land within the 52 m (170 ft)-wide barge deck, but must also deal with ocean swells and GPS errors. SpaceX CEO Elon Musk first displayed a photograph of the newly designated "autonomous spaceport drone ship" in November 2014. The ship is designed to hold position to within 3 meters (9.8 ft), even under storm conditions.

On 8 April 2016, the first stage of the rocket that launched the Dragon 1 C110 spacecraft ahead of CRS-8, successfully landed on the drone ship named Of Course I Still Love You, the first successful landing of a rocket booster on a floating platform. By early 2018, SpaceX had two operational drone ships and had a third under construction. By September 2018, sea platform landings had become routine for the SpaceX launch vehicles, with over 23 attempted and 17 successful recoveries.

As of 2018, Blue Origin was in development and intending to land the first stage boosters of New Glenn on a hydrodynamically-stabilized ship. They purchased a ship that had been built in 2004 as a roll-on/roll-off cargo ship to begin refit and testing. with the goal to make the booster stages reusable. The moving ship idea was abandoned before development was complete and the ship was scrapped in 2022.

The replacement design by Blue Origin was to refit a barge, similar but larger than the SpaceX droneship barges, for use as a landing platform. Landing Platform Vessel 1 (LPV-1), formerly known as DAMEN MANGALIA 522520, is also known by Blue Origin as Jacklyn, the same name as its predecessor ship that was scrapped. LPV-1 arrived in Port Canaveral in September 2024, and is expected to be used to recover launched boosters on the Atlantic Ocean, downrange of the Blue Origin Florida launch facility, beginning in 2025.

Rocket Lab is also preparing their 400ft long Return On Investment landing platform (formerly Oceanus) for their Neutron rocket.

- The first stage of the I-Space's Hyperbola-3 rocket is expected to land vertically using landing legs to land on a floating platform, Xingji Guihang (“Interstellar Return”).

== Operation ==
Floating platforms have the benefit of being able to receive or launch space launch vehicles out on the open ocean to keep the operation away from populated areas, for reasons of safety.

Floating launch platforms can be moved substantial distances across the ocean, to be repositioned for launches.

The use of a floating launch platform allows for the rocket to be positioned more easily than with a fixed launch pad on land. For example, Sea Launch moved their platform closer to Earth's equator to gain a bit of extra momentum and gain additional performance from the rocket. The Chinese Long March 11 did something similar for its 2019 sea launch.
