= Multi-mission radioisotope thermoelectric generator =

Nuclear thermal source whose heat is converted into electricity

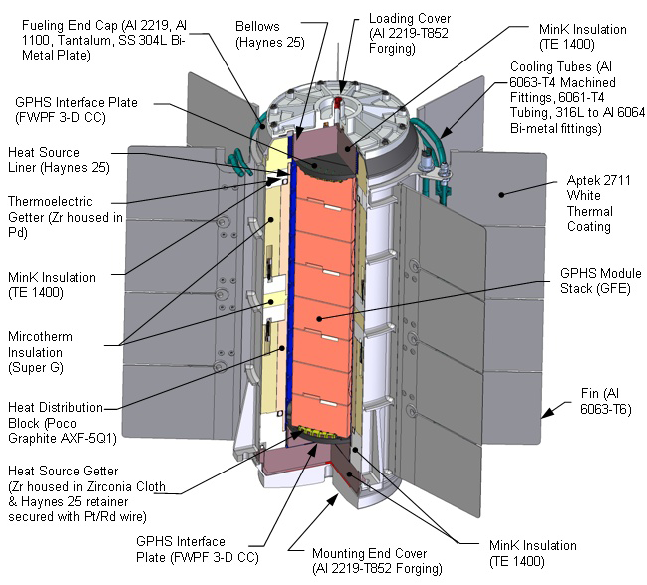
Diagram of a MMRTG

The multi-mission radioisotope thermoelectric generator (MMRTG) is a type of radioisotope thermoelectric generator (RTG) developed for NASA space missions such as the Mars Science Laboratory (MSL), under the jurisdiction of the United States Department of Energy's Office of Space and Defense Power Systems within the Office of Nuclear Energy. The MMRTG was developed by an industry team of Aerojet Rocketdyne and Teledyne Energy Systems.

== Background ==
Space exploration missions require safe, reliable, long-lived power systems to provide electricity and heat to spacecraft and their science instruments. One such power source is the radioisotope thermoelectric generator (RTG) – essentially a nuclear battery that converts heat into electricity. Radioisotope power has been used on eight Earth orbiting missions, eight missions to the outer planets, and the Apollo missions after Apollo 11 to the Moon. The outer Solar System missions are the Pioneer 10 and 11, Voyager 1 and 2, Ulysses, Galileo, Cassini and New Horizons missions. The RTGs on Voyager 1 and Voyager 2 have been operating since 1977. In total, over the last four decades, 26 missions and 45 RTGs have been launched by the United States.

== Function ==
Solid-state thermoelectric couples convert the heat produced by the natural decay of the radioisotope plutonium-238 to electricity. The physical conversion principle is based on the Seebeck effect, obeying one of the Onsager reciprocal relations between flows and gradients in thermodynamic systems. A temperature gradient generates an electron flow in the system. Unlike photovoltaic solar arrays, RTGs are not dependent upon solar energy, so they can be used for deep space missions.

== History ==
In June 2003, the Department of Energy (DOE) awarded the MMRTG contract to a team led by Aerojet Rocketdyne. Aerojet Rocketdyne and Teledyne Energy Systems collaborated on an MMRTG design concept based on a previous thermoelectric converter design, SNAP-19, developed by Teledyne for previous space exploration missions. SNAP-19s powered Pioneer 10 and Pioneer 11 missions as well as the Viking 1 and Viking 2 landers.

== Design and specifications ==
The MMRTG is powered by eight Pu-238 dioxide general-purpose heat source (GPHS) modules, provided by the US Department of Energy (DOE). Initially, these eight GPHS modules generate about 2 kW thermal power.

The MMRTG design incorporates PbTe/TAGS thermoelectric couples (from Teledyne Energy Systems), where TAGS is an acronym designating a material incorporating tellurium (Te), silver (Ag), germanium (Ge) and antimony (Sb). The MMRTG is designed to produce 125 W electrical power at the start of mission, falling to about 100 W after 14 years. With a mass of 45 kg, 4.8 kg of which is its plutonium dioxide fuel the MMRTG provides about 2.8 W/kg of electrical power at beginning of life.

The MMRTG design is capable of operating both in the vacuum of space and in planetary atmospheres, such as on the surface of Mars. Design goals for the MMRTG included ensuring a high degree of safety, optimizing power levels over a minimum lifetime of 14 years, and minimizing weight.

The MMRTG has a length of 66.83 cm (26.31 in), and without the fins it has a diameter of 26.59cm (10.47 in), while with the fins it has a diameter of 64.24cm (25.29 in). The fins themself have a length of 18.83cm (7.41 in).

== Usage in space missions ==
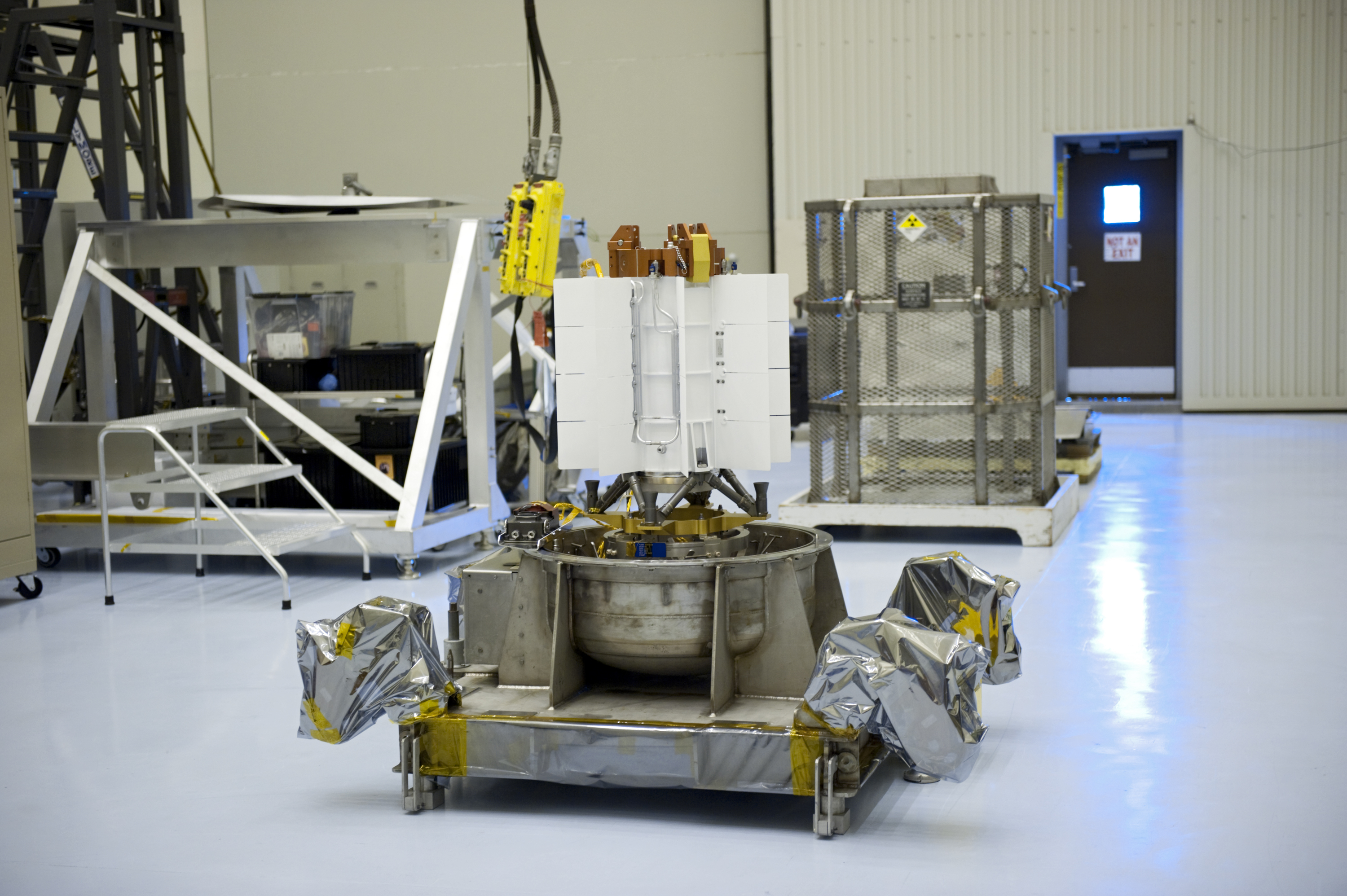
The multi-mission radioisotope thermoelectric generator of the Mars Science Laboratory

Curiosity, the MSL rover that was successfully landed in Gale Crater on August 6, 2012, uses one MMRTG to supply heat and electricity for its components and science instruments. Reliable power from the MMRTG will allow it to operate for several years.

On February 20, 2015, a NASA official reported that there is enough plutonium available to NASA to fuel three more MMRTGs like the one used by the Curiosity rover. One was used by Mars 2020 and its Perseverance rover. The other two have so far been assigned to different missions. One was selected for use on the Dragonfly rotorcraft to explore Saturn's largest moon, Titan. The other is tentatively assigned to the PROMISE lunar rover, which is Perseverance's vehicle system test bed (VSTB) and was formerly used for testing at JPL before being repurposed for a lunar south pole mission as part of NASA's Artemis program.

A MMRTG was successfully launched into space on July 30, 2020, aboard the Mars 2020 mission, and is now being used to supply the scientific equipment on the Perseverance rover with heat and power. The MMRTG used by this mission is the F-2 built by Teledyne Energy Systems, Inc. and Aerojet Rocketdyne under contract with the US Department of Energy (DOE) with a lifespan of up to 17 years.

The upcoming NASA Dragonfly mission to Saturn's moon Titan will use one of the two MMRTGs for which the Aerojet Rocketdyne/Teledyne Energy Systems team has recently received a contract. The MMRTG will be used to charge a set of lithium-ion batteries, and then use this higher-power-density supply to fly a quad helicopter in short hops above the surface of Titan.

The proposed PROMISE rover mission to the moon would use an MMRTG for power, to allow it to survive the lunar night.

== Cost ==
The MMRTG cost an estimated US$109,000,000 to produce and deploy, and US$83,000,000 to research and develop. For comparison the production and deployment of the GPHS-RTG was approximately US$118,000,000.

== See also ==
- Advanced Stirling radioisotope generator
- Nuclear power in space
- Radioisotope thermoelectric generator (RTG)
- Thermoelectric effect:
  - Seebeck effect: generating an electrical current from a temperature gradient
  - Peltier effect: generating a temperature gradient from an electrical current
  - Thomson effect: heating or cooling of a current-carrying conductor with a temperature gradient
