= LP5 (disambiguation) =

LP5 may refer to:

== Albums ==
- LP5 (Autechre album), a 1998 album by Autechre
- "LP5" (Massive Attack album), the working title for a 2010 album by Massive Attack that was later released as Heligoland
- LP5 (Coldplay album), the working title for a 2011 album by Coldplay that was later released as Mylo Xyloto
- LP5 (Apparat album), a 2019 album by Apparat
- LP5 DLX (Asking Alexandria album), a 2019 rerelease of the 2017 album Asking Alexandria (album) by Asking Alexandria
- LP5 (John Moreland album), a 2020 album by John Moreland

== Other uses ==
- LP5, a document for forming limited partnerships in England and Wales

== See also ==
- LPV (disambiguation)
