= PROMISE (rover) =

Proposed NASA lunar rover

Polar Rover for Observation, Mapping and In-Situ Exploration
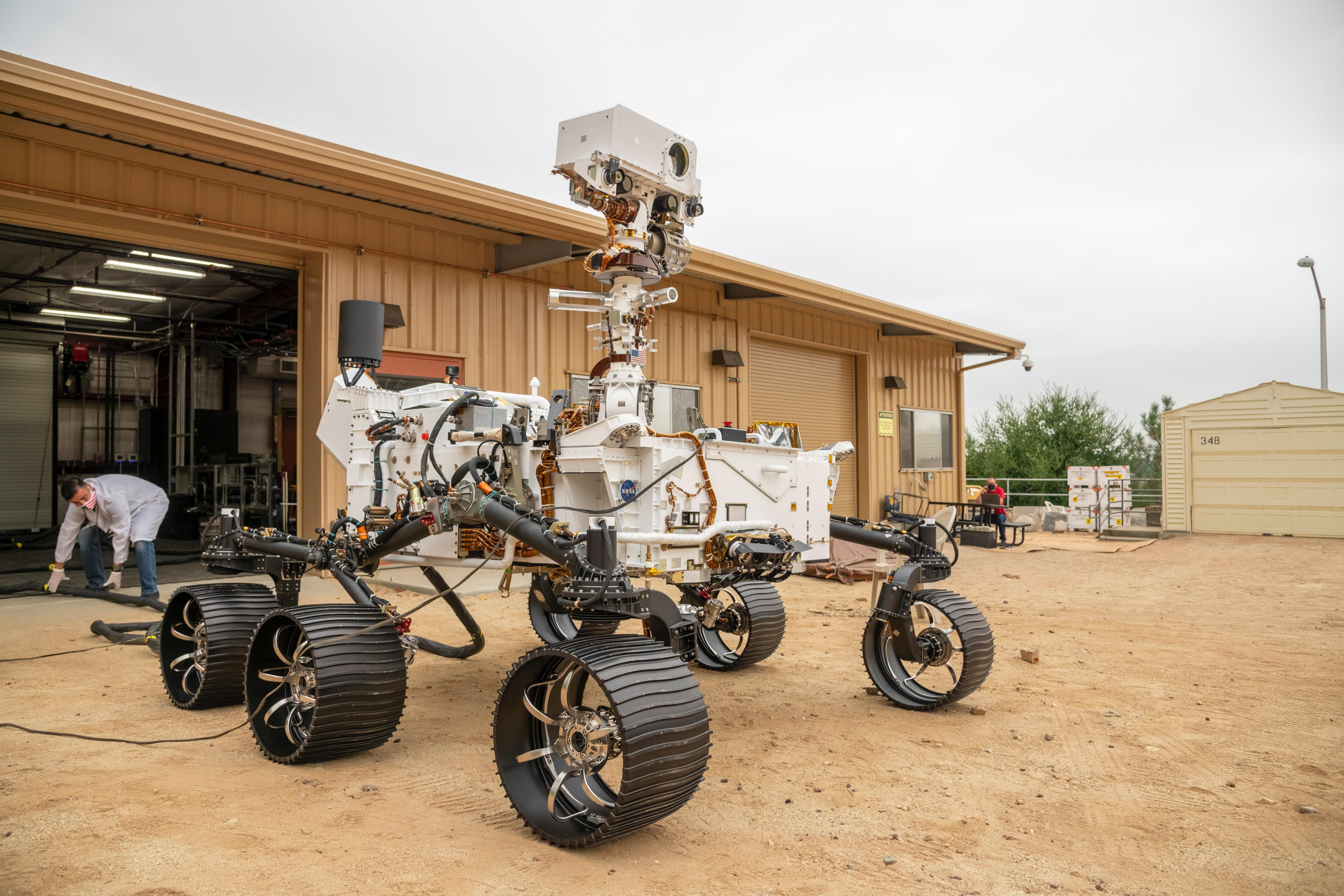
- Type: Lunar rover
- Owner: NASA
- Manufacturer: Jet Propulsion Laboratory

Specifications
- Dimensions: 2.9 m × 2.7 m × 2.2 m (9 ft 6 in × 8 ft 10 in × 7 ft 3 in)
- Dry mass: 1,025 kilograms (2,260 lb)
- Communication: UHF: ~400 MHz, 2 Mbit/s; X band: 7–8 GHz, 800 bit/s
- Power: MMRTG; 110 watt

Instruments
- Cachecam; EDLC × 2; Hazcam × 8; Mastcam-Z; MEDA; Microphones; MOXIE; Navcam × 2; PIXL; RIMFAX; SHERLOC; SuperCam

PROMISE (Polar Rover for Observation, Mapping and In-Situ Exploration, formerly known as MAGGIE) is a proposed NASA lunar rover intended to explore the lunar south pole as part of the Moon Base program.

In July 2026, NASA Administrator Jared Isaacman announced that the agency is considering launching the twin engineering model of the Mars rover Curiosity to the Moon. It would be retrofitted with additional electronics, flight-spare, and test-bed parts built for the Curiosity and Perseverance missions. The rover would be powered by a radioisotope thermoelectric generator, allowing it to remain operational during the Moon's long lunar nights.

== History ==
MAGGIE, an acronym for Mars Automated Giant Gizmo for Integrated Engineering, was built ahead of the launch of Curiosity to Mars over a period of two years by the Jet Propulsion Laboratory as a near-perfect replica of Curiosity, to be a vehicle system test bed (VSTB) used for testing and troubleshooting. It is housed at the JPL Mars Yard along with Perseverance's VSTB, OPTIMISM, and is used to test operational procedures and to aid in problem solving should any issues arise with Curiosity. It is powered by electrical power cables in service as the VSTB for Curiosity.

In July 2026, NASA Administrator Jared Isaacman announced that the agency was considering launching the rover, now renamed PROMISE, to the Moon. The rover would be powered by a radioisotope thermoelectric generator, allowing it to remain operational during the Moon's long nights. Engineers at JPL believe that the rover, originally designed for Mars, could be modified to be usable on the Moon. The rover would be used to prospect for resources and scout locations for future lunar infrastructure, with the same scientific capabilities as the Curiosity and Perseverance rovers.

This was confirmed by NASA on November 7, 2026, saying that PROMISE would be delivered to the Lunar south pole on a Blue Moon MK1 launched on a New Glenn rocket targeting late 2028.

Instruments fitted to the rover during deployment are planned to include the following;

1. The Regolith and Ice Drill for Exploring New Terrain (TRIDENT)
2. Mass Spectrometer Observing Lunar Operations (MSOLO)
3. Near-Infrared Volatiles Spectrometer System (NIRVSS)
4. Neutron Spectrometer System (NSS)
5. Lunar Advanced Filter Observing Radiometer for Geologic Exploration (LAFORGE)
6. Radiation Assessment Detector (RAD)
7. Laser Retroreflector Array (LRA)
8. Lunar Dashcam
