= Lycée Paul Valéry =

Lycée Paul Valéry may refer to the following schools:

- Lycée Paul Valéry (FR) in Paris
- Lycée Français Paul Valéry de Cali in Cali, Colombia
- Lycée Paul Valéry in Meknès, Morocco
