= Isogrid =

Type of partially hollowed-out structure

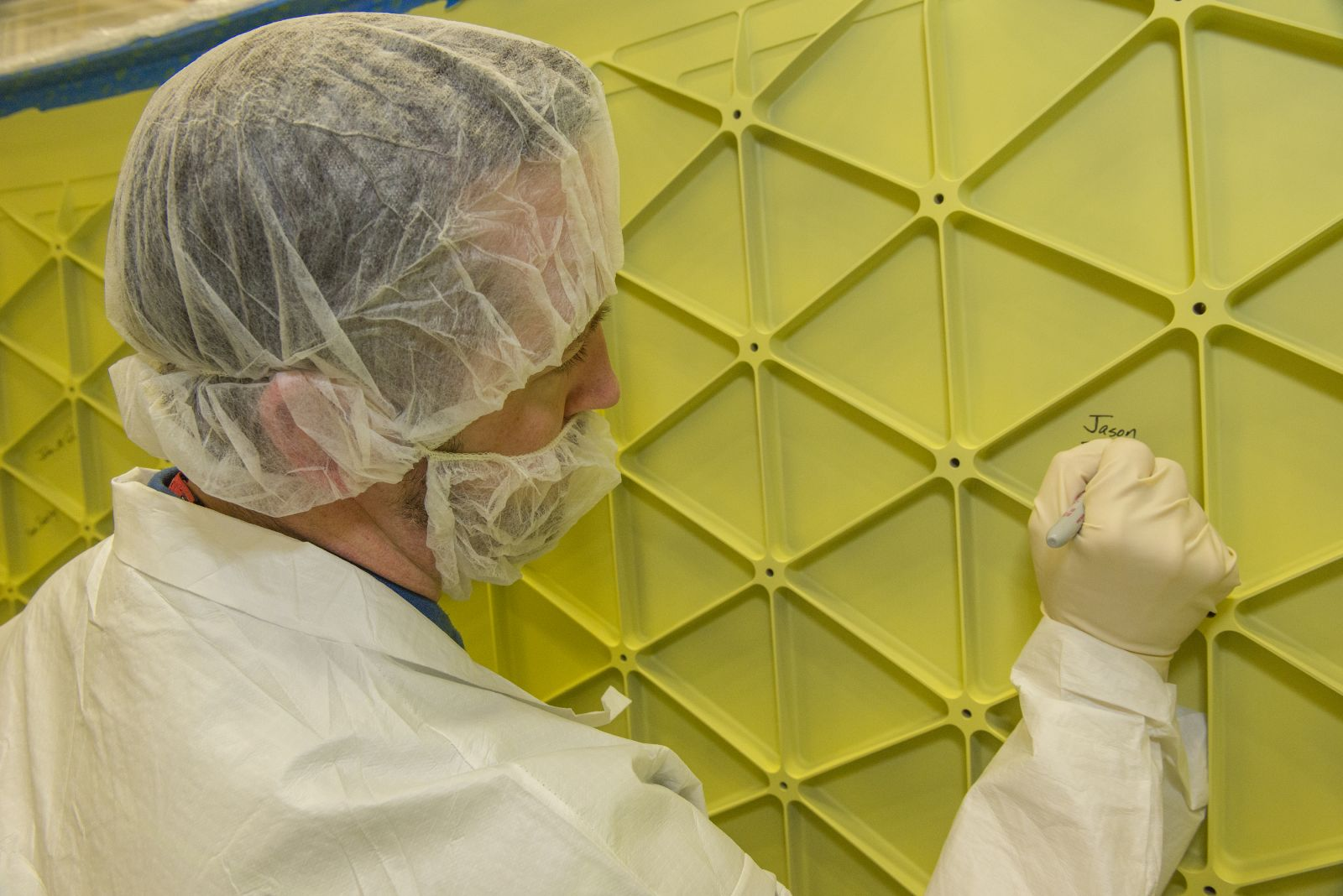
Isogrid on the interior of the adapter connecting the Orion spacecraft to the Delta IV rocket for Exploration Flight Test 1

Isogrid is a type of partially hollowed-out structure formed usually from a single metal plate with integral triangular stiffening stringers. It was patented by McDonnell Douglas (now part of Boeing) in 1975. Isogrids are extremely light and stiff. Compared to other materials, it is expensive to manufacture, and so it is restricted to spaceflight applications and some aerospace use.

== Theory and design ==
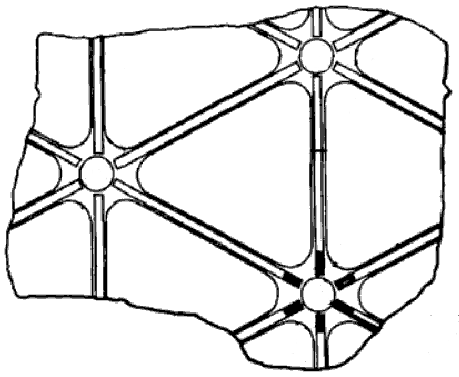
Top view of isogrid panel

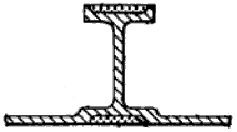
Cross-section of isogrid flange stiffener

Isogrid structures are related to sandwich-structured composite panels; both can be modeled using sandwich theory, which describes structures with separated, stiff face sheets and a lighter interconnecting layer. Isogrids are manufactured from single sheets of material and with large-scale triangular openings, and an open pattern to the flanges, compared to closed sheets and foam or honeycomb structures for the sandwich-composite structures.

Isogrid structures are constituted by a thin skin reinforced with a lattice structure. Such structures are adopted in the aeronautical industry since they present both structural resistance and lightness.

The term isogrid is used because the structure acts like an isotropic material, having the same properties along any axis. Traditionally, the equilateral triangle pattern was used because it was amenable to simplified analysis. A variant is the orthogrid (sometimes called a waffle grid), which uses rectangular rather than triangular openings. It is not isotropic (has different properties in different orientations), but matches many use cases well and is easier to manufacture.

== Manufacturing ==
The stiffeners of an isogrid are generally machined from one face of a single sheet of material such as aluminium with a CNC milling machine. A thickness less than 0.04 inches (1.0 mm) might require chemical milling processes.

A major push has been made toward additive manufacturing techniques due to a decrease in overall material and production costs and high efficiency and accuracy while providing control over parameters like porosity. Also, the ease of prototype manufacturing for testing purposes has made a huge contribution.

Composite isogrids are rib-skin configurations, where at least a part of the rib is a different material from the skin, the composite assembled by various manual or automated processes. This can give extremely high strength-to-weight ratios.

== Uses ==
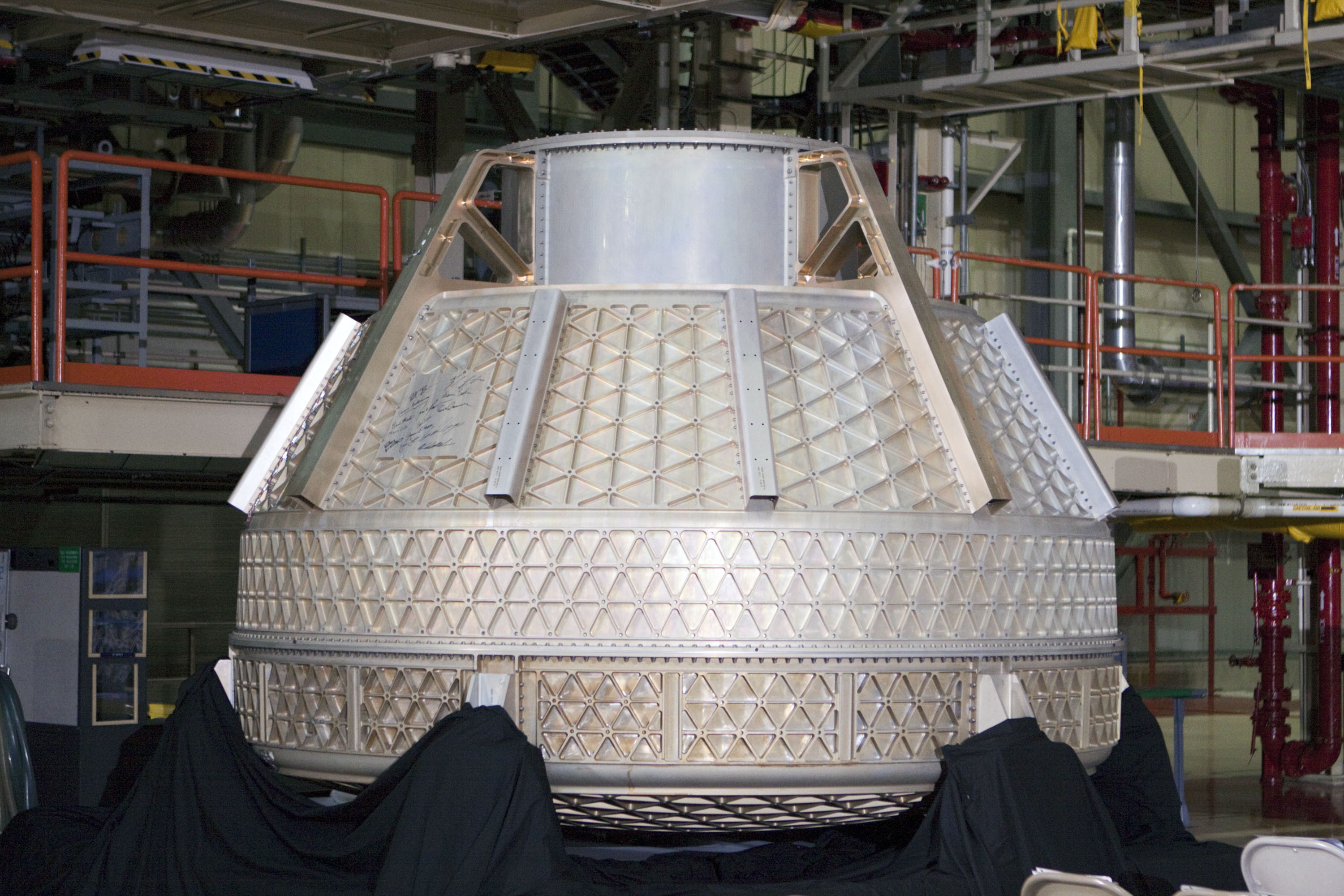
Isogrids on the CST-100 pressure vessel

Isogrid panels form self-stiffened structures where low weight, stiffness, strength and damage tolerance are important, such as in aircraft or space vehicles. Aerospace isogrid structures include payload shrouds and boosters, which must support the full weight of upper stages and payloads under high G loads. Their open configuration with a single, sealed sheet facing the outside makes them especially useful for propellant tanks for rockets, where sealing the propellant in, but allowing it to drain in use or maintenance are necessary features.

== Examples ==
Some spacecraft and launch vehicles which use isogrid structures include:

- Delta families
- Atlas families
- Skylab space station Orbital Workshop module
- SLS Core Stage
- CST-100 Starliner
- SpaceX Crew Dragon

=== Orthogrid ===
Orthogrid (also known as waffle grid) is similar to isogrid, but with a square pattern; examples include:

- Saturn rocket tanks, due to the lower cost and ease of manufacture
- Vulcan rocket
- New Glenn rocket tanks
- Space Launch System core stage tanks

== See also ==
- Honeycomb structure
- Hollow structural section
- Space frame
- Speed holes
- Truss
- Waffle slab, concrete structure similar to orthogrid
