= Autogenous pressurization =

Use of self-generated gaseous propellant

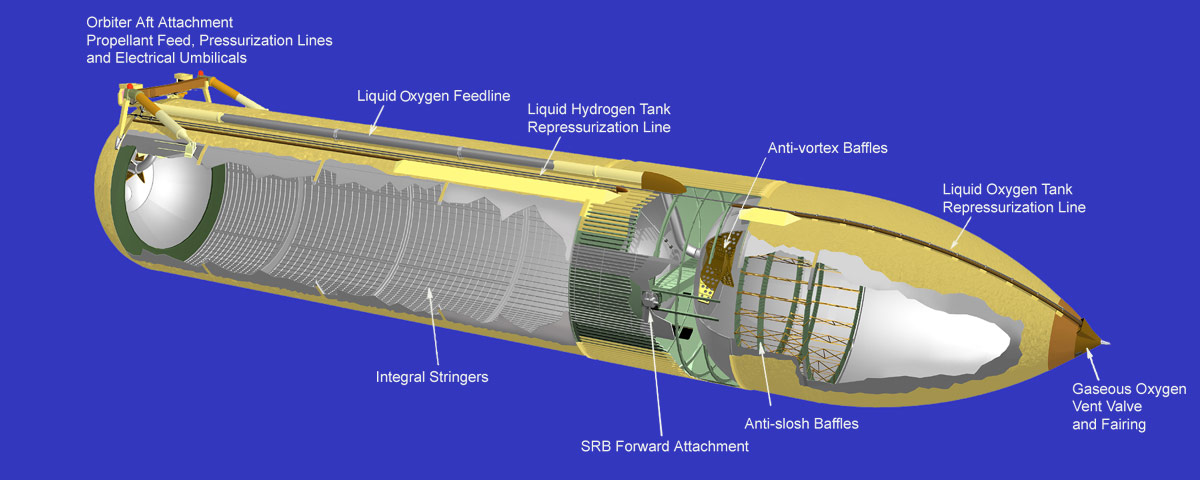
Cutaway of Space Shuttle external tank

Autogenous pressurization is the use of self-generated gaseous propellant to pressurize liquid propellant in rockets. Traditional liquid-propellant rockets have been most often pressurized with other gases, such as helium, which necessitates carrying the pressurant tanks along with the plumbing and control system to use it. Autogenous pressurization has been operationally used on the Titan 34D, Space Shuttle, Space Launch System, Starship, Terran 1, and New Glenn. Autogenous pressurization is planned to be used on Rocket Lab's Neutron rocket.

== Background ==
As propellant is drained from its tank, something must fill the vacated ullage space to maintain pressure inside the tanks. This is for two reasons: first, rocket engines require a minimum inlet pressure to prevent cavitation in their turbopumps, and second, rockets usually require that their tanks be pressurized for structural strength.

In autogenous pressurization, a small amount of propellant is heated until it turns to gas. That gas is then fed back into the liquid propellant tank it was sourced from. This helps keep the liquid propellant at the required pressure necessary to feed a rocket's engines. This is achieved through gas generators in a rocket's engine systems: tapped off from a gas generator; fed through a heat exchanger; or via electric heaters. Autogenous pressurization was already in use in the Titan booster by 1968 and had been tested with the RL10 engine, demonstrating its suitability for upper stage engines.

Traditionally, tank pressurization has been provided by a high pressure inert gas such as helium or nitrogen. Autogenous pressurization has been described as both less and more complex than using helium or nitrogen but it does provide significant advantages. The first is for long-term spaceflight and interplanetary missions such as going to and landing on Mars. Removing inert gases from usage allows engine firing in a non-pumping mode. The same vaporized gases can be used for mono- or bi-propellant attitude control. The reuse of onboard oxidizer and fuel also reduces the contamination of combustibles by inert gases.

Risk reduction benefits come from reducing the requirement of high pressure storage vessels and completely isolating fuel and oxidizer systems, removing a possible failure path via the pressurization subsystem (e.g. SpaceX CRS-7). This system also increases payload capacity by reducing component and propellant weight and increased chamber pressure.

A major risk of autogenous pressurization is that it is prone to ullage collapse if the propellant sloshes. If the ullage gas mixes with the liquid propellant, such as during spacecraft maneuvers, it will be cooled and can condense to liquid, causing a sudden loss of pressure. Thus, autogenous pressurization is suited for booster engines which will operate under constant acceleration in a single direction, but is difficult to use when there are multiple engine burns separated by zero-g maneuvers.

The RS-25 engines used autogenous pressurization to maintain fuel pressure in the Space Shuttle external tank.
