= Limiting pressure velocity =

Tribological term

Limiting pressure velocity is a tribological term relating to the maximum temperature and compression that an assembly with rubbing surfaces can bear without failing. Pressure-limiting valves are a type of pressure control valve. They safeguard the system against excessive system pressure or limit the operation pressure.

Pre-load valves, also called sequence valves are a type of pressure control valve. They generate a largely constant pressure drop between the inlet and outlet on the valve. In the opposite direction, the flow can pass freely. In the normal position, the valve has minor leakage.
