= Freighter =

A freighter is a vehicle or person that transports cargo, supplies, or goods, and may refer to:

- Cargo ship
- A large motor vehicle used to transport goods, known as a truck in the US and a "lorry" in the UK
- The combination of a tractor unit with a semi-trailer, sometimes called a "semi" or "semi-truck"
- Cargo aircraft
- Cargo spacecraft
- Bristol Freighter, an aircraft

== See also ==
- Heavy hauler
- Common carrier
