= New Glenn =

Partially-reusable heavy-lift launch vehicle by Blue Origin

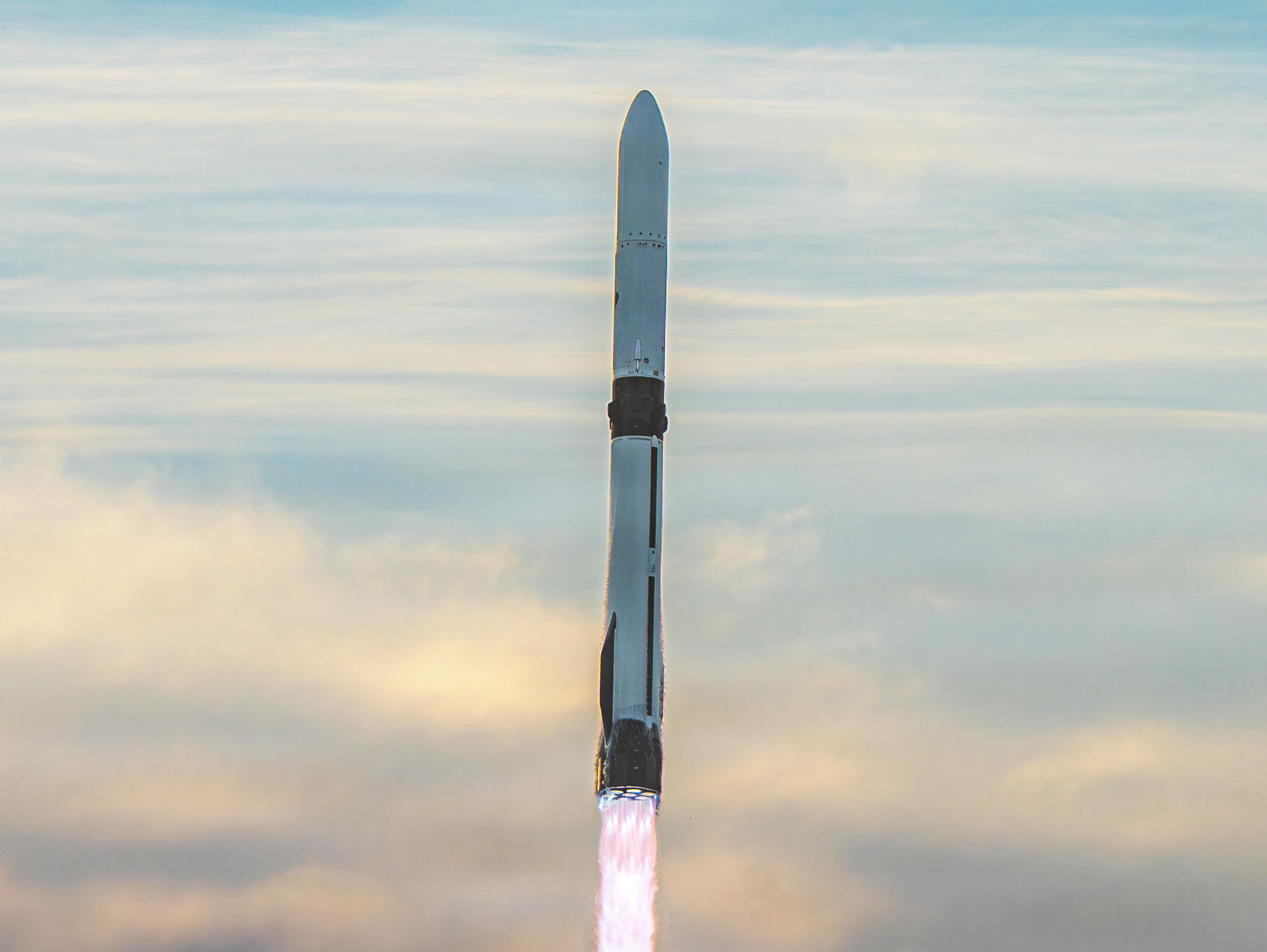
- New Glenn 7x2 in its third mission, launching BlueBird 7 in April 2026.
- Function: 7×2: Heavy-lift launch vehicle; 9×4: Super heavy-lift launch vehicle
- Manufacturer: Blue Origin
- Country of origin: United States
- Project cost: At least US$2.5 billion
- Cost per launch: US$68–110 million

Size
- Height: 7×2: 98 m (322 ft); 9×4: ≈120 m (400 ft)
- Diameter: 7 m (23 ft)
- Stages: 2 or 3

Capacity

Payload to LEO
- Mass: 7×2: 45,000 kg (99,000 lb); 9×4: >70,000 kg (150,000 lb)

Payload to GTO
- Mass: 7×2: 13,600 kg (30,000 lb)

Payload to GSO
- Mass: 7×2 with GS3: 8,000 kg (18,000 lb); 9×4 with GS3: 14,000 kg (31,000 lb)

Payload to TLI
- Mass: 7×2: 7,000 kg (15,000 lb); 7×2 with GS3: 10,000 kg (22,000 lb); 9×4 with GS3: 20,000 kg (44,000 lb)

Associated rockets
- Comparable: Angara A5; Ariane 6; Falcon Heavy; Long March 5; Long March 10; NGLV; SLS; Starship; Vulcan Centaur

Launch history
- Status: Inactive
- Launch sites: Cape Canaveral, LC‑36A (inactive; damaged by explosion) & LC‑36B (future); Vandenberg, SLC‑14 (future)
- Total launches: 3
- Success(es): 2
- Failure: 1
- Landings: 2 / 3 attempts
- First flight: January 16, 2025
- Last flight: April 19, 2026 (BlueBird 7, most recent)
- Carries passengers or cargo: Blue Ring; Blue Moon; BlueBird (AST SpaceMobile); Amazon Leo; NSSL

First stage – GS1
- Height: 57.5 m (189 ft)
- Powered by: 7×2: 7 × BE-4 or Northstar; 9×4: 9 × BE-4 or Northstar
- Maximum thrust: 7×2 with BE-4: 19,928 kN (4,480,000 lb_{f}); 7×2 with Northstar: 22,260 kN (5,005,000 lb_{f}); 9×4 with BE-4: 25,622 kN (5,760,000 lb_{f}); 9×4 with Northstar: 28,620 kN (6,435,000 lb_{f})
- Specific impulse: vac: 340 s (3.3 km/s)
- Burn time: 190 seconds
- Propellant: LOX / CH_{4}

Second stage – GS2
- Height: 23.4 m (77 ft)
- Powered by: 7×2: 2 × BE-3U; 9×4: 4 × BE-3U
- Maximum thrust: 7×2: 1,779 kN (400,000 lb_{f}); 9×4: 3,558 kN (800,000 lb_{f})
- Specific impulse: 445 s (4.36 km/s)
- Burn time: 644 seconds
- Propellant: LOX / LH_{2}

Third stage (optional) – GS3
- Powered by: 1 × BE-7
- Specific impulse: 460 s (4.5 km/s)
- Propellant: LOX / LH_{2}

New Glenn is a family of two-stage partially reusable launch vehicles developed and operated by the American company Blue Origin. The rocket has an operational heavy-lift New Glenn 7×2 configuration with a payload capacity of 45 tons to low Earth orbit, there is also an under-development super heavy-lift New Glenn 9×4 configuration targeting a payload capacity of over 70 tons to LEO. Both use seven-meter (23 ft) diameter stages with a slightly wider first stage aft module containing the engines and landing legs.

Development of New Glenn began before 2013 and was officially announced in 2016. The rocket is named for NASA astronaut John Glenn, the first American to orbit Earth. A test vehicle was first erected on the launch pad in February 2024. Its first flight, NG-1, took place on January 16, 2025, from Cape Canaveral Launch Complex 36. Carrying the Blue Ring Pathfinder, the launch served as the first of several demonstration flights required for certification for the National Security Space Launch program.

As with Blue Origin's suborbital New Shepard rocket, New Glenn's first stage is designed for reuse. It lands at sea on a barge called Landing Platform Vessel 1. The first stage achieved its first successful landing on November 13, 2025, during New Glenn's second flight, NG-2. New Glenn is slated to launch Blue Origin's Blue Moon Mark 1 lunar lander on robotic missions.

The New Glenn 7×2 first stage is powered by seven methalox BE-4 engines, while the second stage uses two hydrolox BE-3U engines; both engine types are designed and built by Blue Origin. It launches from Cape Canaveral Launch Complex 36 (LC-36), with future missions planned from Vandenberg Space Launch Complex 14 (SLC-14). It is one of three US heavy-lift rockets, alongside the Vulcan Centaur from United Launch Alliance and Falcon Heavy from SpaceX. In May 2026 an explosion occurred during testing of a NG7x2 first stage which heavily damaged LC-36.

In November 2025, Blue Origin announced New Glenn 9×4, a larger variant with nine BE-4 engines on the first stage, four BE-3U engines on the second stage, and a larger payload fairing measuring 8.7 meters (29 ft) in diameter.

== History ==
=== Development ===
Blue Origin design concepts in 2012 described an orbital human spacecraft system utilizing a reusable first-stage booster, of a smaller size than New Glenn, that would launch like a conventional multistage vertical launch vehicle until stage separation where the upper stage would continue into orbit while the first-stage booster would descend to perform a powered vertical landing. From the earliest design concepts, the first-stage booster was intended to be refueled and relaunched to reduce the costs of access to space. The booster launch vehicle would be powered by the BE-3 engine and was designed to launch Blue Origin's biconic capsule design carrying astronauts and supplies. The concept was that after it's mission and upon returning to Earth the capsule would descend under parachutes onto land for recovery and reuse on future missions.

Further plans for an orbital launch vehicle were made public in 2015, with the announcement that LC-36 would be the pad for their upcoming BE-4 powered rocket manufactured at a nearby facility in Exploration Park. In early 2016, Blue Origin indicated that the first orbital launch was expected no earlier than 2020 from the Florida launch facility. In September 2016 Blue Origin publicly unveiled the vehicle, as well as the New Glenn name in honor of the astronaut John Glenn. At the time the design was described as a 7 m (23 ft) diameter, two- or three-stage rocket, with a reusable first stage landing vertically. In this initial design the first and second stages were both to use methalox BE-4 engines, seven on the first stage and one on the second stage. An optional third stage would be powered by a single BE-3 hydrolox engine. At the time first stage reuse for up to 100 flights was their design target.

In March 2017, Jeff Bezos showed graphics of the New Glenn which had two large strakes at the bottom of the booster. In the September 2017 announcement, Blue Origin announced a much larger 7 m (23 ft) payload fairing for New Glenn, up from 5.4 m (18 ft) in the originally announced design and continued to forecast a 2020 debut.

New Glenn design as of October 2018

By March 2018, the launch vehicle design had changed. It was announced that the New Glenn second stage would now be powered by two vacuum versions of the flight proven BE-3 liquid hydrogen/liquid oxygen rocket engine (BE-3U) with a single BE-3U engine for the third stage deep space option. The three-stage booster variant was subsequently cancelled completely in January 2019. By mid-2018, the low-level design was not yet complete and the likelihood of achieving an initial launch by 2020 was being called into question by company engineers, customers, industry experts, and journalists. In October 2018, the Air Force announced Blue Origin was awarded $500 million for development of New Glenn as a potential competitor in future contracts, including Evolved Expendable Launch Vehicle (EELV) Phase 2. The October 2018 award was terminated in December 2020 after Blue received $255.5 million of the $500 million.

By February 2019, several launches for New Glenn had been contracted: five for OneWeb, an unspecified amount of Telesat, one each for Eutelsat, mu Space Corp and SKY Perfect JSAT. In February 2019, Blue Origin indicated that no plans to build a reusable second stage were on the company's roadmap. In the event, by July 2021, Blue Origin was again evaluating options for getting to a reusable second-stage design: Project Jarvis.

In August 2020 the Air Force announced that New Glenn was not selected for the National Security Space Launch Phase 2 launch procurement. Due to this, in February 2021 Blue Origin announced that the first flight would slip to no earlier than late 2022.

By December 2020, Blue Origin indicated that the BE-4 engine delivery to United Launch Alliance (ULA) would slip to summer 2021, and ULA disclosed that the first launch of the New Glenn competitor ULA Vulcan Centaur would now be no earlier than 4Q 2021. Blue Origin announced a further schedule slip for the first launch of New Glenn in March 2021 when the company said New Glenn "would not launch until the fourth quarter of 2022, at the earliest".

By 2021, Blue had changed the published reuse specification for New Glenn to a minimum of 25 flights, from their 2016 statement targeting up to 100 flights.

In March 2022, the expected first launch of New Glenn slipped to no earlier than Q4 2023.

In January 2024, the first stage of New Glenn was being transported at Kennedy Space Center from the factory to the launch complex in preparation for a 2024 launch.

In February 2024, a boilerplate of both the first and second stages of New Glenn was erected on launch pad LC-36 for the first time. This test vehicle was not in flight-ready condition and had no functioning engines mounted. In May 2024, New Glenn was rolled out again for additional testing prior to a planned launch later in the year.

==== Reusable upper stage ====
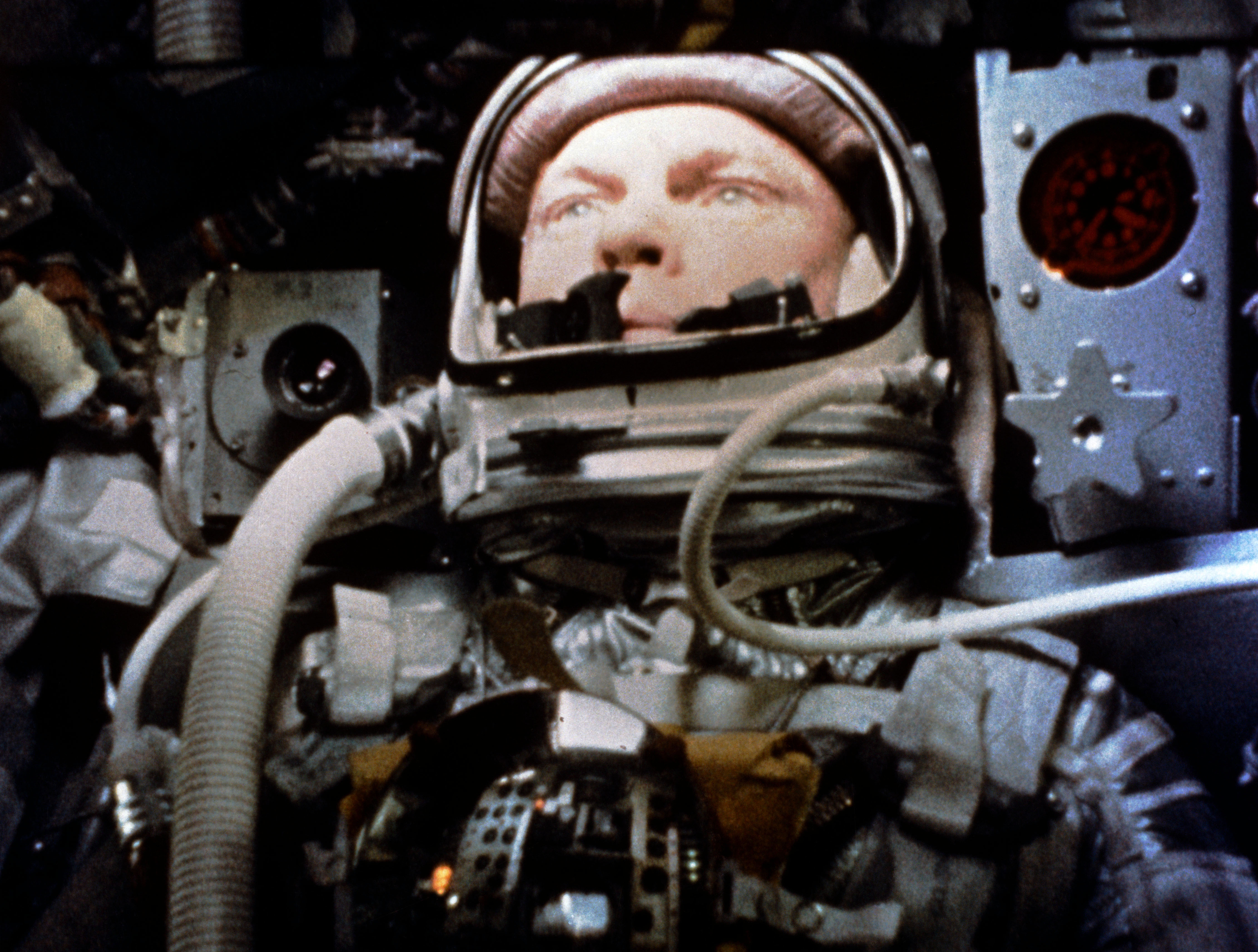
John Glenn, the first American to orbit Earth and the namesake of the New Glenn spacecraft, piloting the Friendship 7 space capsule during his flight on February 20, 1962

Although New Glenn's original second stage was designed to be expendable, Blue Origin later studied concepts for making it reusable. In July 2021, Ars Technica reported that the company had started Project Jarvis, an effort to develop a fully reusable second stage for New Glenn. The project included work on stainless-steel propellant tanks and structures; in August 2021, a stainless-steel test tank was moved to Launch Complex 36 for planned ground pressure testing with cryogenic propellants.

In parallel, Blue Origin evaluated several possible reusable-stage architectures, including a winged stage that would reenter as a spaceplane, an aerospike engine concept in which the engine would also serve as a heat shield, and a high-drag design using flaps and a thermal protection system similar in broad concept to SpaceX Starship. In September 2024, Bezos said Blue Origin had a design for a reusable second stage and was developing its thermal protection system, but was still assessing whether aluminum or stainless steel should be used. He also said the company was continuing work on a cheaper expendable second stage and could abandon second-stage reuse if an expendable design proved more economical.

After New Glenn's first flight in January 2025, Ars Technica reported that Project Jarvis had been shelved.

=== Inaugural launch ===
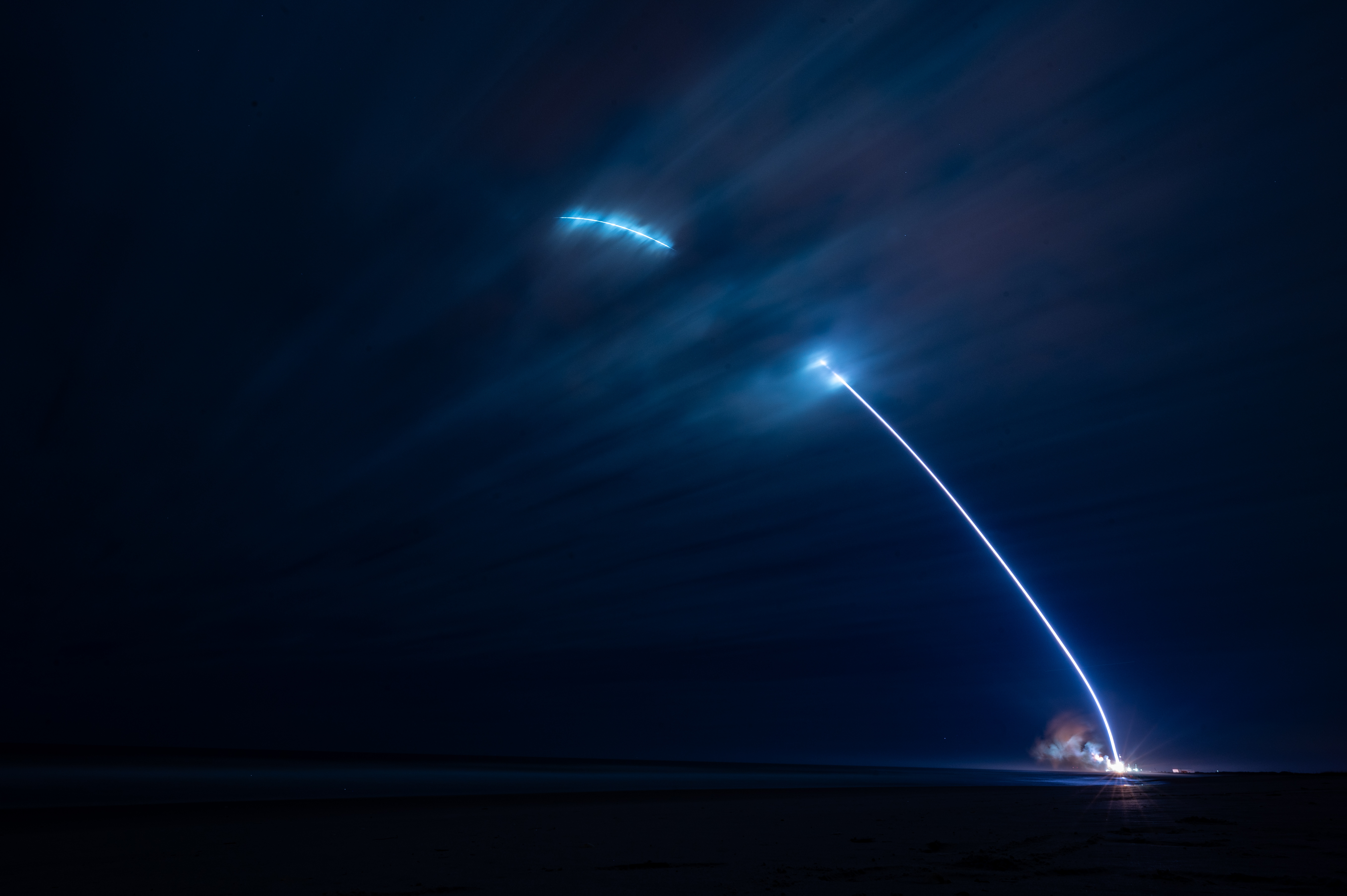
New Glenn launches from Space Launch Complex 36 at Cape Canaveral Space Force Station, January 16, 2025.

On June 12, 2024, Blue Origin received its communications license for the inaugural flight of New Glenn. The vehicle was selected for the U.S. NSSL program with expectation that the inaugural launch would occur no later than December 2024.

Preparations began in earnest in late August for what was to be New Glenn's debut launch, carrying the ESCAPADE mission consisting of two Photon satellites destined for Mars on a VADR contract from NASA. After consultation with NASA, both parties was decided to forgo the October launch window to avoid "significant cost, schedule, and technical challenges", as well as the risks of removing fuel from the vehicle in the event of a launch delay.

As of September 2024, the debut launch was planned to be a demonstration launch for the United States Space Force's National Security Space Launch program, carrying the Blue Ring Pathfinder. The booster for the flight was named So You're Telling Me There's a Chance, alluding to the difficulty of landing a reusable booster on the first attempt.

Testing continued in September 2024 with successful hot fire tests of the second stage. The completed first stage moved to the launchpad on October 30, 2024, ahead of the first flight.

The Flight 1 vehicle was moved to the launchpad on November 20, 2024, for static fire testing. Full wet dress rehearsal occurred on December 19, 2024, and a 24-second static fire was conducted on December 27.

On January 13, 2025, Blue Origin conducted their first launch attempt with the vehicle. After several slips in the countdown, the attempt was scrubbed at approximately 3:05 AM EST (0805 UTC).

On January 16, 2025, 2:03 AM EST (0703 UTC), New Glenn launched for the first time. Blue Origin reached orbit on its first attempt, injecting the GS-2 upper stage and the Blue Ring Pathfinder payload into medium earth orbit. Blue Origin stated that So You're Telling Me There's a Chance was lost on descent. Telemetry showed that the booster was traveling at an approximate speed of Mach 5.5 at an altitude of 84,226 ft (25.7 km) before it was deemed lost.

Following the unsuccessful landing, a mishap investigation into the atmospheric reentry of the returning booster was led by Blue Origin, with the involvement and review by the FAA. This investigation was successfully completed by March 31, 2025.

=== First recovery via Landing Platform Vessel 1 ===
On November 13, 2025, a New Glenn first stage, GS1-2 Never Tell Me the Odds, successfully landed on the Landing Platform Vessel Jacklyn positioned around 375 miles (600 km; 330 nmi) offshore in the Atlantic Ocean. This made Blue Origin the second company, behind SpaceX and its Falcon rockets, to successfully deploy a spacecraft in orbit while landing the vehicle's booster.

=== Static fire test explosion ===
On May 28, 2026, a New Glenn rocket named No, It's Necessary exploded during a static fire test at Cape Canaveral Launch Complex 36. The explosion destroyed the vehicle and severely damaged the launch site, Blue Origin's only operational facility. No injuries were reported. The loss of the vehicle and damage to Launch Complex 36 has disrupted Blue Origin's launch schedule. According to industry sources cited by Ars Technica, repairs to the launch complex or completion of an alternative launch facility could take more than a year. It is still unclear how the incident will affect planned New Glenn launches including the Blue Moon lunar cargo and crew landers as well as other payloads such as Amazon LEO.

=== New Glenn 9×4 ===
On November 20, 2025, Blue Origin announced the development of a new super heavy-lift version of New Glenn, designated New Glenn 9×4. The variant will use nine BE-4 engines on its first stage and four BE-3U engines on its second stage. According to the company, it will be capable of launching more than 70,000 kilograms (150,000 lb) to Low Earth orbit, over 14,000 kilograms (31,000 lb) on a direct insertion to geosynchronous orbit, and more than 20,000 kilograms (44,000 lb) to a trans-lunar injection trajectory. It will also feature an enlarged payload fairing measuring 8.7 meters (29 ft) in diameter. To support the 9x4 variant Blue Origin plans to build a new LC-36B pad that is larger than the rebuilt LC-36A.

An image released by Blue Origin CEO Dave Limp depicted the New Glenn 9×4 as taller than the Saturn V. While the company did not provide an official timeline, media reports indicated that the variant could enter service as early as 2027. Blue Origin stated that both the 7×2 and 9×4 versions of the rocket are intended to operate concurrently. Media reports also noted that the 9×4 configuration would offer lift capacity approaching that of NASA's Space Launch System (SLS) rocket while retaining a reusable first stage (which SLS does not have) and a larger payload fairing, and could cost less than one-tenth as much per launch.

== Description and technical specifications ==
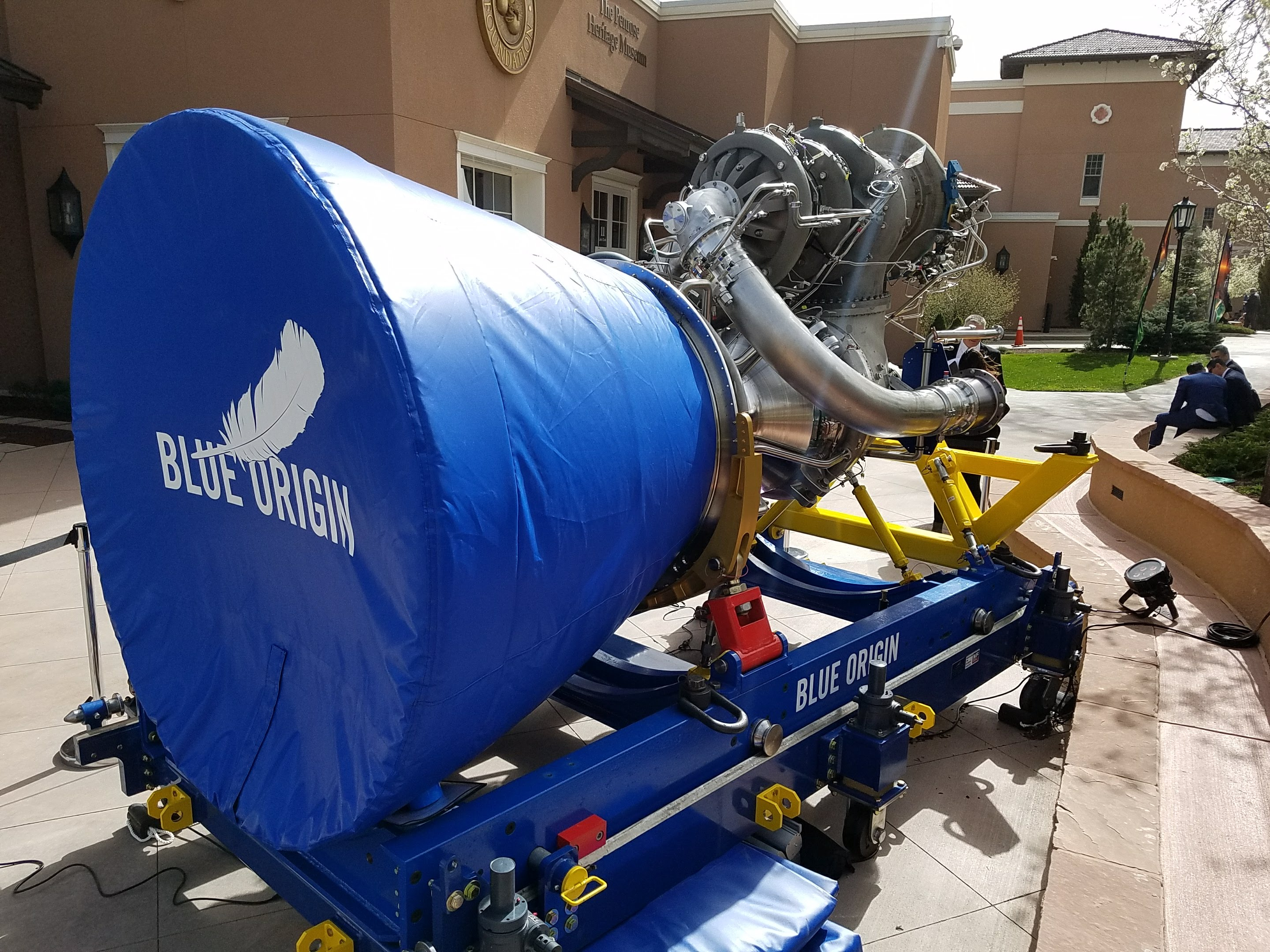
The first hotfire-tested Blue Origin BE-4 rocket engine, serial number 103, at the 34th Space Symposium in Colorado Springs, Colorado, April 2018, showing the liquid methane inlet side of the engine

New Glenn is a 7 m (23 ft) diameter two-stage orbital launch vehicle with a reusable first stage and an expendable second stage. A configuration using a third stage titled GS3 was announced by Blue Origin featuring a 5.5 m (18 ft) composite tank and a BE-7 engine. The third stage will allow for higher energy orbits, without reducing cargo carrying capacity.

The first stage, called GS1, is designed to be reusable for a minimum of 25 flights, and lands vertically, a technology previously developed by Blue Origin and tested in 2015–2016 on its New Shepard suborbital launch vehicle. The second stage, called GS2, shares the same diameter and is "roughly 88 feet (26.8 meters) tall" and is expendable. Both stages use orthogrid aluminum tanks with welded aluminum domes and common bulkheads. Both stages also use autogenous pressurization.

The first stage is powered by seven BE-4 methane/oxygen engines—designed and manufactured by Blue Origin—producing 17,000 kN (3,800,000 lb_{f}) of liftoff thrust. Its liquid oxygen propellant tank has a volume of 30,000 cu ft (850 m^{3}) while the fuel tank can store almost 25,000 cu ft (710 m^{3}) of liquid methane. The previous engines are planned to be replaced with a upgraded version of BE-4 named Northstar that was designed to have higher performance, and lower cost.The second stage is powered by two BE-3U vacuum optimized engines, also designed and manufactured by Blue Origin, using hydrogen/oxygen as propellants.

The company stated in 2017 that the planned full operational payload capacity of the two-stage version of New Glenn would be 13,000 kg (29,000 lb) to GTO and 45,000 kg (99,000 lb) to a 51.6° inclined LEO, though the initial operating capability could be somewhat lower. As of 2018, dual-satellite launches were intended to be offered after the first five flights.

Launches of New Glenn are made from the Cape Canaveral Space Force Station in Florida, with Launch Complex 36 (LC-36) leased to Blue Origin in 2015 in support of the New Glenn program. On April 14, 2026, Blue Origin and the U.S. Space Force announced plans to give New Glenn polar orbit capabilities through building a West Coast launch facility at Vandenberg Space Force Base in California, to be called Space Launch Complex 14 (SLC-14).

The first stage boosters of New Glenn are intended to be reusable, and were originally intended to be recovered downrange on the Atlantic Ocean via their landing platform ship Jacklyn, which would have acted as a floating movable landing platform. The hydrodynamically stabilized ship would have increased the likelihood of successful recovery in rough seas.

== Manufacturing ==
The main assembly of the New Glenn launch vehicle will occur in the Blue Origin rocket manufacturing facility in Florida, near Launch Complex 36 (LC-36) which the company leased from Spaceport Florida. Launch Complex 36 (LC-36) has hosted more than 100 launches, formerly launching the Atlas II and Atlas III rockets.

Tooling and equipment for the factory began to be ordered and built in 2015. In July 2018, the build of the largest device, a 16 m (52 ft) tall × 41 m (135 ft) long × 13 m (43 ft) wide Ingersoll "Mongoose" cryogenic-tank and fairing fabrication machine, was completed after a three-year design/build process. It was to be installed in the Florida facility in Exploration Park later in 2018. As of September 2018, Blue Origin had invested over $1 billion in its Florida manufacturing facility and launch site, and stated it intended to spend much more going forward.

== Launch services ==
Blue Origin planned as of 2018 to offer both single-payload dedicated flights and, after the fifth launch, dual-manifesting of large communications satellites to be transported to geostationary transfer orbit (GTO). All contracted launches from the start will feature a reusable first stage, so just like the practice in commercial aircraft transport, landing conditions can affect the timing and flight parameters of a launch.

=== Launch service customers ===
By 2018, Blue Origin had contracts in place with four customers for New Glenn flights. Eutelsat, Thailand startup mu Space Corp and SKY Perfect JSAT have geosynchronous orbit communications satellite launches planned after 2020, while internet satellite constellation fleet operator OneWeb had an agreement by 2018 for five launches.

In January 2019, Telesat signed a multi-launch contract "to launch satellites for its future low-Earth-orbit broadband constellation on multiple New Glenn missions" and thus is Blue Origin's fifth customer.

In 2022, Amazon announced that it had contracted 12 flights of New Glenn, with an option for 15 more, for deployment of the Kuiper satellite constellation.

In February 2023, NASA announced that it had selected Blue Origin to launch the ESCAPADE spacecraft to Mars. In May 2024, it was announced the spacecraft had reached substantial completion in preparation for launch later in the year; however NASA subsequently moved the ESCAPADE payload from the first flight of New Glenn to a later flight of the rocket.

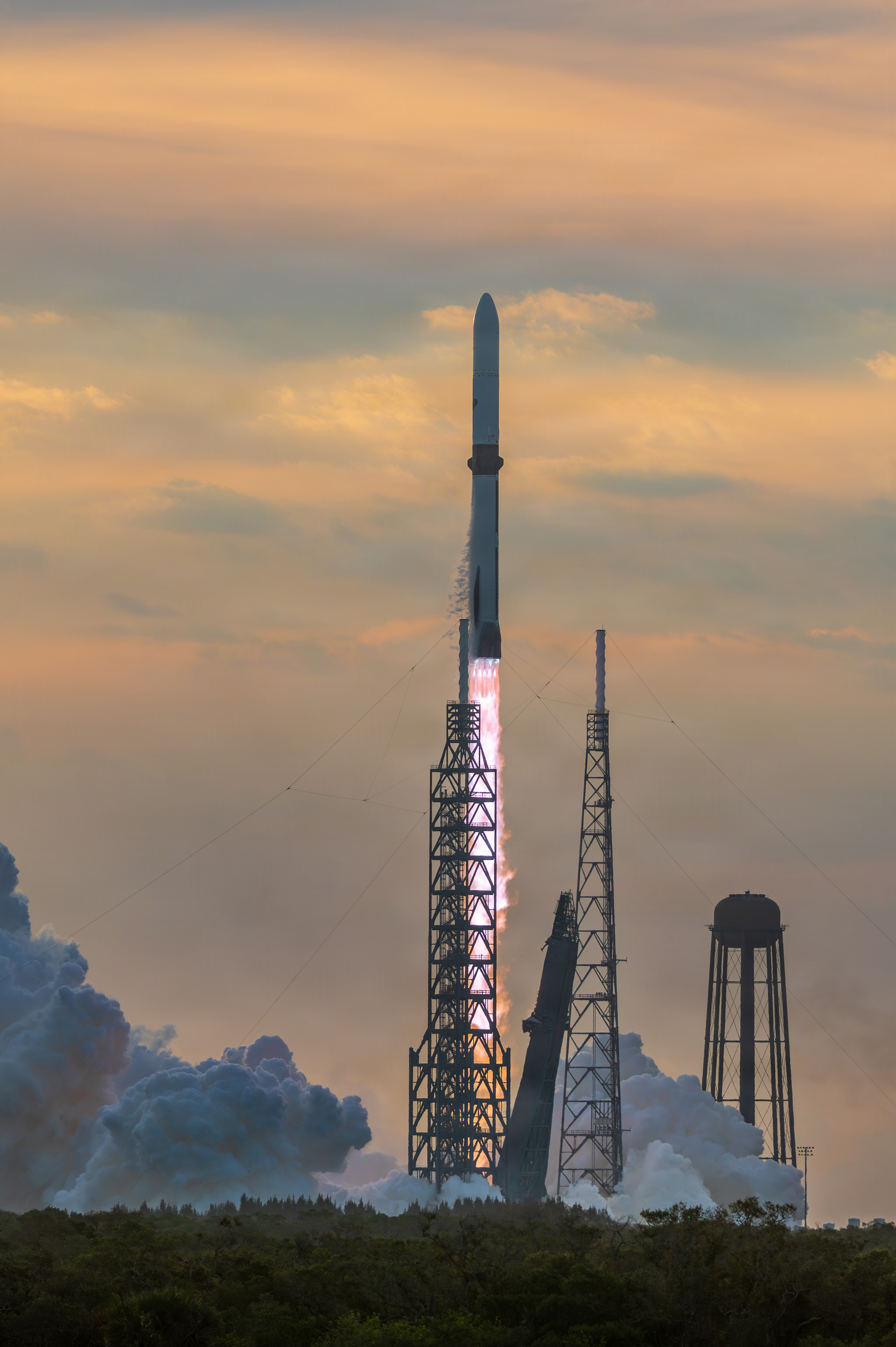
New Glenn during is third mission (NG-3), launching BlueBird 7.

In November 2024, AST SpaceMobile selected Blue Origin to launch some of its Block 2 satellites. In April 2026, an upper stage malfunction on this launch left BlueBird 7 in a lower-than-planned orbit, and the satellite was to be deorbited.

In April 2025, Space Systems Command awarded a National Security Space Launch Phase 3 Lane 2 contract to Blue Origin. As the third provider, Blue Origin is projected to be awarded 7 flights, with an anticipated value of $2.4 billion.

=== Schedule-oriented launch cadence ===
Blue Origin intends to contract its launch services in a different structure compared to contract options that have been traditionally offered in the commercial launch market. The company has stated they will contract to aim to have a regular launch cadence of up to eight launches a year. If one of the payload providers for a multi-payload launch is not ready on time, Blue stated in 2018 that they intended to hold to the launch timeframe, and fly the remaining payloads on time at no increase in price. This is different from how dual-launch manifested contracts have been traditionally handled by Arianespace (Ariane 5 and Ariane 6) and Mitsubishi Heavy Industries (H-IIA and H3). SpaceX and International Launch Services can offer dual-launch contracts, but prefer dedicated missions.

== Funding ==
The development and manufacture of the New Glenn is being funded by Jeff Bezos, founder of Amazon, and the Department of the Air Force. Initially funded entirely by Bezos, after 2019 New Glenn will also receive $500 million in funding under the United States Space Force National Security Space Launch (NSSL) program. By September 2017, Bezos had invested $2.5 billion into New Glenn.

== Launch history ==
=== Rocket configurations ===
- New
- Reused booster

=== Launch outcomes ===
- Success
- Partial failure
- Failure
- Planned

=== Booster landings ===
- LPV failure
- LPV success
- No attempt

=== 2025 ===
Flight No.	Date and time (UTC)	Booster (Note: The final number of the string indicates the flight count. For example, GS1-2‑1 and GS1-2‑2 represent the first and second flights of booster GS1-2, Never Tell Me The Odds. Boosters without this suffix were expended on their first flight. Additionally, missions where boosters are making their first flight are shown with a mint-colored background.)	Launch site	Payload	Payload mass	Orbit	Customer	Launch outcome	Booster landing
NG-1	January 16, 2025; 07:03	GS1-1; So You're Telling Me There's a Chance	Cape Canaveral, LC‑36A	Blue Ring Pathfinder	Unknown	MEO	Blue Origin	Success	Failure (Jacklyn)
NG-1	Maiden/demonstration flight of New Glenn, carrying the Blue Ring Pathfinder. First of four National Security Space Launch demonstration flights for New Glenn. The January 13 launch attempt was scrubbed due to problems with the rocket. The second stage with non-separable payload was inserted into a 2,400 km (1,500 mi; 1,300 nmi) × 19,300 km (12,000 mi; 10,400 nmi) medium Earth orbit at an inclination of 30°. The first stage was lost and failed to land.								
NG-2	November 13, 2025; 20:55	GS1-2-1; Never Tell Me The Odds	Cape Canaveral, LC‑36A	ESCAPADE (Blue & Gold)	1,070 kg (2,360 lb)	Sun-Earth L_{2} to Areocentric	NASA	Success	Success (Jacklyn)
NG-2	Second of four National Security Space Launch demonstration flights for New Glenn, carrying the ESCAPADE (Escape and Plasma Acceleration and Dynamics Explorers) mission for NASA as part of their low-cost SIMPLEx program, aiming to investigate Mars' magnetosphere and a technology demonstration payload named Viasat InRange for Viasat. New Glenn deployed two spacecraft to a loiter orbit around the Earth-Sun L_{2} Lagrange point. The upper stage was placed into a heliocentric disposal orbit. NASA paid Blue Origin about $20 million for the launch. Delayed from October 13, 2024; ESCAPADE was originally intended to be launched on the debut flight of New Glenn. A launch attempt on November 9, 2025, was scrubbed due to weather conditions, with a future launch date scheduled for November 12. This was delayed a day further due to a solar storm. First successful first stage landing for New Glenn.								

=== 2026 ===
Flight No.	Date and time (UTC)	Booster	Launch site	Payload	Payload mass	Orbit	Customer	Launch outcome	Booster landing
NG-3	April 19, 2026 11:25	GS1-2-2; Never Tell Me The Odds	Cape Canaveral, LC‑36A	BlueBird 7	6,100 kg (13,400 lb)	LEO	AST SpaceMobile	Failure	Success (Jacklyn)
NG-3	First mission for a commercial customer. First launch of an AST SpaceMobile Block 2 BlueBird satellite on New Glenn to expand cellular broadband satellite constellation. Multi-launch contract was signed in November 2024. First launch of a reused New Glenn first stage, previously flying on ESCAPADE in November 2025. The satellite was intended to be deployed to a 460 km (290 mi; 250 nmi) low Earth orbit at an inclination of 49.4°. Due to an issue with the second stage, the satellite was left in an off-nominal 265 km (165 mi; 143 nmi) × 465 km (289 mi; 251 nmi) × 43° orbit, too low to sustain operations, forcing it to be de-orbited. In response, the Federal Aviation Administration grounded New Glenn and required a mishap investigation. On May 22, the FAA cleared New Glenn to return to service.								

=== Planned launches ===
Launches are expected to take place "no earlier than" (NET) the listed date.

=== 2027 ===
Date and time (UTC)	Booster	Launch site	Payload	Payload mass	Orbit	Customer
January 2027	Unknown	Cape Canaveral, LC‑36	Blue Ring 1 (BR-1)	Unknown	LEO	Blue Origin
January 2027	Return-to-flight mission after the on-pad explosion in May 2026. First flight of Blue Ring, Blue Origin's maneuverable space vehicle. The spacecraft will be deployed to a 400 km (250 mi; 220 nmi) × 45,000 km (28,000 mi; 24,000 nmi) × 28.5° elliptical Earth orbit, designated Demonstration Orbit 0 (DO-0).					
Q1 2027	Unknown	Cape Canaveral, LC‑36	BlueBird Block 2 × 3	12,600 kg (27,800 lb)	LEO	AST SpaceMobile
Q1 2027	Second launch of AST SpaceMobile Block 2 BlueBird satellites on New Glenn to expand cellular broadband satellite constellation. Multi-launch contract was signed in November 2024. Subsequent launches are expected to carry 6 or 8 satellites.					
Q1 2027	Unknown	Cape Canaveral, LC‑36	LeoSat × 48 (LN‑01)	~27,000 kg (60,000 lb)	LEO	Amazon (Amazon Leo)
Q1 2027	The first set of Amazon Leo (formerly Project Kuiper) satellites to launch on New Glenn was planned for June 4, 2026. However, during a static fire test on May 28, 2026, booster GS1-3 (No, It's Necessary) and an upper stage exploded and were destroyed. The satellites were not on board the vehicle at the time of the explosion.					
Q1 2027	Unknown	Cape Canaveral, LC‑36	Blue Moon MK1-101 (Endurance)	21,715 kg (47,873 lb)	LEO to TLI	NASA (CLPS)
Q1 2027	Will carry a Blue Moon Mark 1 lander, planned to make a landing on the Moon. The lander will be deployed into a 185 km (115 mi; 100 nmi) × 3,300–3,700 km (2,100–2,300 mi; 1,800–2,000 nmi) low Earth orbit with an inclination of 28.5–51.6°, before the spacecraft propels itself with a trans-lunar injection (TLI) burn. During the mission Blue Moon will carry the Stereo Cameras for Lunar Plume Surface Studies (SCALPSS) and the Laser Retroreflective Array (LRA), as part of a task order from NASA's Commercial Lunar Payload Services (CLPS) program, awarded in July 2024.					
Q2 2027	Unknown	Cape Canaveral, LC‑36	Blue Moon MK2-D	Unknown	LEO	NASA (Artemis)
Q2 2027	Artemis III will include a rendezvous and docking of Orion and the Blue Moon Earth Orbit Rendezvous Demonstration Vehicle, also known as the MK2-D. The mission will execute in-space tests of the docked vehicles, integrated checkout of life support, communications, and propulsion systems, as well as tests of the new Extravehicular Activity (xEVA) suits.					
2027	Unknown	Cape Canaveral, LC‑36	LeoSat × 48 (LN‑02)	Unknown	LEO	Amazon (Amazon Leo)
2027	Second launch of Amazon Leo (formerly Project Kuiper) satellites on New Glenn to expand LEO internet constellation. Amazon Leo was also founded by Blue Origin founder Jeff Bezos; however, the two companies are not directly connected. Initial launches of Amazon Leo on New Glenn will carry 48 satellites, with payload sizes expected to increase over time as vehicle performance is improved.					
Q4 2027	Unknown	Unknown	NRO Task Order-4	Unknown	Unknown	NRO (NSSL)
Q4 2027	First National Security Space Launch (NSSL) Phase 3 Lane 1 task order for New Glenn, providing for one launch of a mission set for the NRO to be completed between Q4 2027 and Q1 2028. New Glenn was previously onboarded to the Phase 3 Lane 1 program in June 2024.					
Q4 2027	Unknown	Cape Canaveral, LC‑36	Blue Moon MK1-102 (VIPER)	Unknown	TLI	NASA (CLPS)
Q4 2027	Will carry the VIPER rover, which was previously cancelled in 2024.					

=== 2028 ===
Date and time (UTC)	Booster	Launch site	Payload	Payload mass	Orbit	Customer
Q1 2028	Unknown	Cape Canaveral, LC‑36	Blue Moon MK1-103 (LTV)	Unknown	TLI	NASA (CLPS)
Q1 2028	Will carry a lunar terrain vehicle (LTV) from Astrolab or Lunar Outpost.					
Q1 2028	Unknown	Cape Canaveral, LC‑36	Blue Moon Mark 2 Lander	Unknown	LEO	NASA (Artemis)
Q1 2028	Sustaining HLS uncrewed lunar demo for Artemis.					
2028	Unknown	Cape Canaveral, LC‑36	Blue Moon MK1-104 (LTV)	Unknown	TLI	NASA (CLPS)
2028	Will carry a lunar terrain vehicle (LTV) from Astrolab or Lunar Outpost.					
Q4 2028	Unknown	Cape Canaveral, LC‑36	Firefly Elytra / MoonFall	Unknown	Unknown	NASA (CLPS)
Q4 2028	Launch of the Firefly Elytra orbital transfer vehicle, carrying propulsive drones built by JPL as part of NASA's MoonFall mission.					
Q4 2028	Unknown	Cape Canaveral, LC‑36	Blue Moon MK1-105 (PROMISE)	Unknown	Unknown	NASA (CLPS)
Q4 2028	Launch of the fifth Blue Moon MK1 cargo lander, carrying NASA's Polar Rover for Observation, Mapping, and In-Situ Exploration, or PROMISE.					
Q4 2028	Unknown	Cape Canaveral, LC‑36	Unknown	Unknown	Unknown	U.S. Space Force
Q4 2028	Blue Origin, as the Requirement 3 provider is projected to be awarded seven NSSL Phase 3 Lane 2 missions starting in Order Year 3 (FY 2027). With a nominal two-year integration period, these missions would launch no earlier than FY 2029.					

=== 2029 and beyond ===
Date and time (UTC)	Booster	Launch site	Payload	Payload mass	Orbit	Customer
Q1 2029	Unknown	Cape Canaveral, LC‑36	Project Suncatcher	Unknown	SSO	Google
Q1 2029	Google’s first dedicated heavy-lift launch for Project Suncatcher, deploying satellites equipped with Tensor Processing Units (TPUs) for AI compute capacity.					
2033	Unknown	Cape Canaveral, LC‑36	Blue Moon Mark 2 Lander	Unknown	Unknown	NASA (Artemis)
2033	The agency expects Blue Origin to deliver a lunar surface habitat no earlier than fiscal year 2033 using a cargo version of its crewed human lander.					
TBD	Unknown	Cape Canaveral, LC‑36	Blue Ring	Unknown	Unknown	NASA (VADR)
TBD	Launch of a Blue Ring spacecraft, carrying a lunar lander or another payload intended for NASA's Moon Base. First of two launches awarded in November 2026 as part of NASA's Venture-Class Acquisition of Dedicated and Rideshare (VADR) program.					
TBD	Unknown	Cape Canaveral, LC‑36	Blue Ring	Unknown	Unknown	NASA (VADR)
TBD	Launch of a Blue Ring spacecraft, carrying a lunar lander or another payload intended for NASA's Moon Base. Second of two launches awarded in November 2026 as part of NASA's Venture-Class Acquisition of Dedicated and Rideshare (VADR) program.					
TBD	Unknown	Cape Canaveral, LC‑36	Blue Moon Mark 2 Lander	Unknown	LEO	NASA (Artemis)
TBD	Sustaining HLS crewed lunar demo for Artemis. Originally intended for Artemis V, the Artemis IV landing was opened to whichever lander was ready first, as part of NASA's efforts to accelerate the program.					
TBD	Unknown	Cape Canaveral, LC‑36	Unknown	Unknown	Unknown	Eutelsat
TBD	Eutelsat now says it has no specific launch date slated for New Glenn, stating: "New Glenn is part of our portfolio of launch options and will be activated based on our future needs taking into consideration industry conditions at the time. Our launch contract with Blue Origin for a Eutelsat unspecified satellite on a New Glenn rocket is still current. It will help to diversify options for access to space."					
TBD	Unknown	Cape Canaveral, LC‑36	Unknown	Unknown	Unknown	Telesat
TBD	Telesat signed a multi-launch agreement with Blue Origin in 2019 for deployment of their LEO constellation. As of 2023, no specific launches under the agreement had been announced, although Telesat continues to retain launch optionality on New Glenn.					

== See also ==
- List of New Glenn launches
- List of New Glenn boosters
- Space launch market competition
- Falcon Heavy (SpaceX)
- Ariane 6 (Arianespace)
- Vulcan Centaur (United Launch Alliance)
- SpaceX Starship
- Space Launch System (NASA/Boeing), not intended for commercial satellite launch
- Saturn C-3 (1962 NASA Saturn design for Apollo EOR), same lift capacity
- Comparison of orbital launch systems
- Comparison of orbital launcher families
- Blue Origin recovery vessel
