= Blue Ring =

Space tug and satellite platform

- Designer: Blue Origin
- Country of origin: United States

Specifications
- Payload capacity: 4,000 kg (8,819 lb)
- Power: Solar
- Design life: 5 years

Dimensions
- Width: (With solar panels deployed) 44 m (144 ft)

Blue Ring is a spacecraft platform designed to support spacecraft operation, under development by Blue Origin. The platform is to be capable of refueling, transporting, and hosting satellites. A prototype Blue Ring Pathfinder was launched on New Glenn's inaugural flight in January 2025.

Blue Origin is developing NASA's Mars Telecommunications Network orbiter based on the Blue Ring platform.

== Design and function ==
The Blue Ring platform accommodates satellites using a primary payload adapter, capable of supporting a 2 t (4,400 lb) satellite, as well as 12 ESPA and ESPA Grande adapters, capable of supporting 500 kg (1,100 lb)-class satellites. In total, the platform can carry up to 4.000 t (8,819 lb) of payload, depending on the target orbit. The platform is marketed toward a number of destination orbits, include geosynchronous orbits, Lagrange points, cislunar and lunar orbits, and Interplanetary Space. Because of this capability, Blue Origin markets Blue Ring as a space tug as well as a satellite support platform. Other capabilities of Blue Ring include thermal management, communications relaying, and spacecraft refueling. Blue Ring itself is to be capable of refueling in orbit.

The spacecraft is to use a combination of chemical and electric propulsion—chemical propulsion for major maneuvers and electric propulsion for station-keeping maneuvers or to reduce the propellant demands of orbit changes. Electric power is provided by 44 m (144 ft) solar array wings made up of roll-out solar array blankets.

Blue Ring is designed to be launch-vehicle agnostic, allowing launch aboard carrier rockets with EELV-class 5 m (16 ft) fairings such as the Vulcan Centaur, Falcon 9, and Atlas V. The platform is also to be launched on Blue Origin's own New Glenn space launch vehicle.
