= Jacklyn (LPV1) =

Floating landing platform owned by Blue Origin

History

United States
- Name: Landing Platform Vessel 1
- Owner: Blue Origin
- Port of registry: Port Canaveral, Florida
- Laid down: 21 February 2023
- Launched: 31 January 2024
- Completed: 8 August 2024
- In service: 2025
- Identification: IMO number: 9998676

General characteristics
- Type: Floating landing platform
- Tonnage: 13,818 GT
- Length: 115.9 m (380 ft)
- Beam: 45.72 m (150.0 ft)
- Depth: 6.706 m (22.00 ft)
Landing history
- Status: Active
- First landing: NG-2
- Last landing: NG-3
- Associated rockets: New Glenn

Landing Platform Vessel 1 (LPV1), named Jacklyn, is a barge which was manufactured for Blue Origin in 2024 for use as a landing platform ship. It entered service in January 2025 for the New Glenn launch vehicle.

The LPV1 barge replaced the ship, also named Jacklyn, that Blue Origin had purchased in 2018 and intended to use as a landing platform vessel until 2022, when Blue Origin scrapped it.

On 13 November 2025, on the second flight of New Glenn, NG-2, booster GS1-2 (Never Tell Me The Odds) successfully landed on Jacklyn, carrying two ESCAPADE satellites and a ViaSat payload. It was reused for the third flight (NG-3) and landed a second time.

== History ==
Landing Platform Vessel 1 (LPV1) is a specialized barge designed to support Blue Origin's New Glenn rocket launches. It was laid down at a shipyard in Romania in February 2023 and launched in January 2024. The partially completed vessel was towed to Damen Shipyards in Brest, France for finishing works and commissioning in April 2024. Before being named LPV1, it carried the yard identification Damen Mangalia 522520. After brief sea trials, the vessel departed Brest for Florida in August 2024. As of June 2024, LPV1 was planned to see its first use in October 2024, during the maiden launch of the New Glenn rocket, where it would attempt to capture and land the rocket's first stage, but by September, the initial launch had been delayed by Blue Origin.

Blue Origin announced on 2 September 2024, that LPV1 would be nicknamed named Jacklyn. This tribute honors Jeff Bezos's mother, Jacklyn Bezos, whose name was previously given to a ship that Blue Origin had considered using for landing New Glenn while the ship was underway.

LPV1 was active during New Glenn's first flight, NG-1. However, the booster failed during descent, and did not land.

== Landing attempts ==
- LPV failure
- LPV success
- No attempt

No.	Date	Booster No.	Mission	Landing mission description	Landing result
1	16 January 2025	GS1-1 So You're Telling Me There's a Chance	NG-1 / Blue Ring Pathfinder	Maiden/demonstration flight of New Glenn. The second stage made it to orbit, but the first stage was lost and failed to land.	Failure
2	13 November 2025	GS1-2 Never Tell Me The Odds	NG-2 / ESCAPADE (2 spacecraft) and a payload from Viasat	First successful first stage landing for New Glenn.	Success
3	19 April 2026	GS1-2 Never Tell Me The Odds	NG-3 / BlueBird 7	Second successful flight for a New Glenn Booster.	Success

== See also ==
- Autonomous spaceport drone ship – Floating landing platform operated by SpaceX
