= Chris Boshuizen =

Australian entrepreneur

- Born: Australia
- Occupations: Entrepreneur, musician, aeronautical engineer

Chris Boshuizen is an Australian entrepreneur, aeronautical engineer, and musician.

== Early life and education ==
Chris Boshuizen grew up in Tumbarumba, Australia.

He was awarded a PhD from the University of Sydney in 2005.

== Career ==
In 2010, Boshuizen co-founded Planet Labs — a company that designs and manufactures 3U-CubeSat miniature satellites. While working for NASA as an aeronautical engineer, Boshuizen co created PhoneSat.

== Space tourism ==
In 2021, Bosheizen went to space aboard NS-18 along with William Shatner, Audrey Powers, and Glen de Vries. Boshuizen is the third person of Australian descent in space, preceded by Paul Scully-Power and Andy Thomas; however, by a technicality of Australian law at the time, specifically section 17 of the Citizenship Act 1948 at the time of both Scully-Power and Andy Thomas's flights, their status as American citizens invalided their existing Australian citizenship. In 2002, section 17 of the 1948 Citizenship Act was applied granting Scully-Power and Thomas dual citizenship.

== Music career ==
In 2021, Boshuizen released an album titled VHS under the stage name Dr Chrispy, a nickname given to him by colleagues at NASA in tandem with his space flight aboard the Blue Origin space flight NS-18. In 2023, Boshuizen released a second album commemorating two years since his space flight.

== Awards and honours ==
- Advance Global Australian of the Year Award 2014
- Space Generation Advisory Council Alumni Award
- Karman Fellow 2020
