= BE-3 =

Liquid hydrogen/oxygen rocket engine

BE-3PM
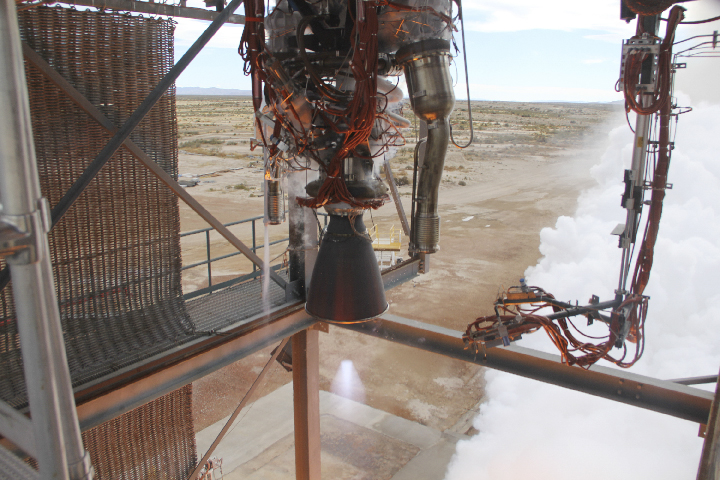
- A BE-3PM engine undergoing testing
- Country of origin: United States
- First flight: April 29, 2015
- Designer: Blue Origin
- Manufacturer: Blue Origin
- Associated LV: New Shepard
- Status: Dormant

Liquid-fuel engine
- Propellant: LOX / LH_{2}
- Cycle: Pump‑fed combustion tap‑off

Performance
- Thrust, sea-level: 490 kN (110,156 lb_{f})
- Throttle range: 18–100%

BE-3U
- Country of origin: United States
- Manufacturer: Blue Origin
- Associated LV: New Glenn
- Status: Active

Liquid-fuel engine
- Propellant: LOX / LH_{2}
- Cycle: Expander bleed

Configuration
- Chamber: 1

Performance
- Thrust, vacuum: Original: 711.5 kN (159,952 lb_{f}); Improved: 889.5 kN (199,968 lb_{f}); Demonstrated: 941.5 kN (211,658 lb_{f})
- Throttle range: 75–100%
- Thrust-to-weight ratio: 90:1
- Specific impulse, vacuum: 445 s (4.36 km/s)

BE-3 (Blue Engine 3) is a cryogenic rocket engine using liquid hydrogen and liquid oxygen as propellants. Blue Origin began BE-3 development in the early 2010s and the engine completed acceptance testing in early 2015. The BE-3PM variant is used on the New Shepard suborbital rocket, which made its first test flight on April 29, 2015, and had its first crewed flight on July 20, 2021. The BE-3U variant is used on the second stage of the New Glenn orbital rocket, which made its inaugural flight on January 16, 2025.

== History ==
Following Aerojet’s acquisition of Pratt & Whitney Rocketdyne in 2012, Blue Origin president Rob Meyerson saw an opportunity to fill a gap in the defense industrial base. Blue Origin publicly entered the liquid rocket engine business by partnering with ULA on the development of the BE-4, and working with other companies. Meyerson announced the selection of Huntsville, AL as the location of Blue Origin’s rocket production factory in June 2017.

The BE-3 follows the earliest rocket engine development efforts at Blue Origin in the 2000s. Blue Origin's first engine was a "simple, single-propellant engine" called the BE-1 (Blue Engine 1) which used peroxide propellant and generated only 8.9 kN (2,000 lbf) of thrust, and their second, the BE-2 (Blue Engine 2) which was a bipropellant engine using kerosene and peroxide, producing 140 kN (31,000 lbf) thrust.

In January 2013, the company announced the development of the BE-3 (Blue Engine 3), a new liquid hydrogen/liquid oxygen (LH_{2}/LOX) cryogenic engine. The engine was originally announced to produce 440 kN (100,000 lbf) thrust, with initial thrust chamber tests planned for mid-February 2013 at NASA Stennis. The thrust chamber tests were run sometime in 2013.

The BE-3 was successfully tested in late 2013 on a full-duration simulated suborbital burn, with coast phases and engine relights, "demonstrating deep throttle, full power, long-duration and reliable restart all in a single-test sequence." NASA has released a video of the test.

By December 2013, Blue Origin updated engine specifications following engine tests conducted on test stands at ground level, near sea level. This demonstrated that the engine could produce 490 kilonewtons (110,000 lbf) of thrust at full power, and could successfully throttle down to as low as 110 kilonewtons (25,000 lbf) for use in controlled vertical landings if needed for that purpose on particular launch vehicles. The final engine specifications, released in April 2015 following the full test phase, included a minimum thrust of 89 kilonewtons (20,000 lbf), an even wider throttling capability by 20 percent than the preliminary numbers, while maintaining the previously released full power thrust spec.

As of December 2013, the engine had "demonstrated more than 160 starts and 9,100 seconds (152 min) of operation at Blue Origin's test facility near Van Horn, Texas." Additional testing of the BE-3 was completed in 2014, with the engine "simulating a sub-scale booster suborbital mission duty cycle." Test stand testing of the engine was completed by April 2015, with over 450 engine firings and a cumulative engine test time of over 500 minutes. Blue Origin stated it would make the first test flight of its New Shepard vehicle later in 2015, with the BE-3PM engine.

In the event, Blue Origin made the first flight test of the BE-3PM engine on the New Shepard suborbital vehicle before the month was out, flying a boost profile to 93,500 meters (307,000 ft) altitude on April 29, 2015.

In April 2015, United Launch Alliance (ULA) was considering the BE-3 for use in a new second stage, the Advanced Cryogenic Evolved Stage (ACES), which was planned to become the primary upper stage for ULA's Vulcan orbital launch vehicle in the 2020s. The Vulcan was planned to begin orbital flights in 2019 with an existing Centaur upper stage, and was considering three engines from various manufacturers for the ACES stage which would putatively begin flight in 2023, with selection expected before 2019.

While development of a sea-level version of the engine, BE-3PM, was completed and fully qualified by early 2015, Blue Origin said then that they intend to develop a vacuum version of the engine to operate in space.

In January 2016, the US Air Force provided partial development funding to Orbital ATK to develop an extendable nozzle for the Blue Origin BE-3U.

On July 20, 2021, the engine design was used in its first crewed flight of the New Shepard.

On September 12, 2022, New Shepard 3 with RSS H.G. Wells capsule suffered an un-contained engine failure that resulted in the triggering of a launch abort and the loss of the vehicle.

On January 16, 2025, a variant of the engine was used in its inaugural orbital flight of the New Glenn.

== Engine design ==
=== BE-3PM ===
The first stage variant of the BE-3, the BE-3PM, uses a pump-fed engine design, with a combustion tap-off cycle to take a small amount of combustion gases from the main combustion chamber in order to power the engine turbopumps.

=== BE-3U ===
Blue Origin has developed an expander bleed cycle variant of the BE-3, the BE-3U. Two of these engines are used to power the New Glenn second stage.

In November 2015, the engine was projected to have a vacuum thrust of 670 kN (150,000 lbf). Development had begun on the extendable nozzle for BE-3U by early 2016. By August 2018, BE-3U engine development had proceeded, test engines built, and had accumulated over 700 seconds of test time, confirming performance assumptions in the design. In February 2019, Blue Origin updated the thrust of BE-3U as used on New Glenn to 712 kN (160,000 lbf).

In February 2020, Blue Origin opened up a factory in Huntsville, Alabama, to produce BE-3U and BE-4 engines.

In August 2024 Jeff Bezos stated that the BE-3U's thrust had been uprated to 765 kN (172,000 lbf) and that its specific impulse is 445s. The reported thrust was later revised to 770 kN (173,000 lbf) in a press release. In April 2025, Dave Limp announced a static fire had been conducted on the New Glenn second stage which increased the maximum thrust of the BE-3U to 778 kN (175,000 lbf).

In November 2025, Dave Limp announced another demonstrated performance increase for BE-3U, this time increasing maximum thrust to 941 kN (211,500 lbf).

== Technical specifications ==
The performance of the sea-level version of the BE-3, the BE-3PM, include:

- Thrust: 490 kilonewtons (110,000 lbf) at full power
- Throttle reduction capability: 89 kilonewtons (20,000 lbf)

== See also ==
- BE-4 – Large liquid methane fuelled staged-combustion rocket engine by Blue Origin
- Comparison of orbital rocket engines
