= Jim Kitchen =

American entrepreneur and space tourist (born 1964)

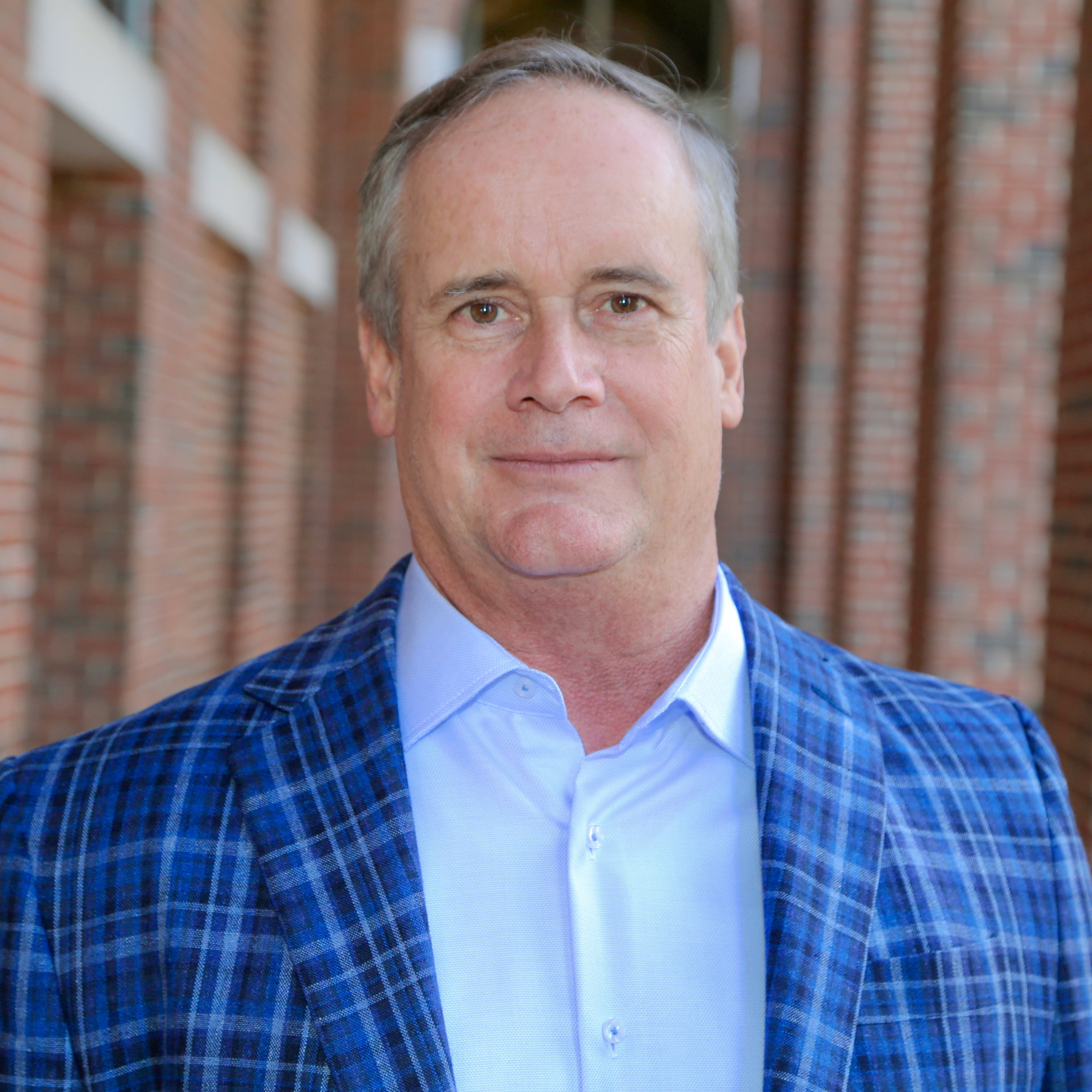
- Kitchen in 2022
- Born: August 15, 1964 (age 62); United States
- Occupation: Entrepreneur · Professor
- Known for: First person to visit all 193 United Nations–recognized countries, descend to Challenger Deep, and travel to space

Jim Kitchen (born August 15, 1964) is an American entrepreneur, professor, and adventurer. He teaches entrepreneurship at the UNC Kenan–Flagler Business School. Kitchen is noted for becoming the first person to travel to all 193 United Nations–recognized countries, journey to space, and descend to the deepest part of the ocean.

== Career ==
Jim Kitchen started his first business in 1985, a marketing business, and promoted low Earth orbit space trips. Afterwards, he started an international tour business as well as several other companies He was instrumental in developing Chapel Hill's entrepreneurship eco-system, opening up accelerator Launch Chapel Hill and student incubator 1789 Venture Lab.

Kitchen began teaching entrepreneurship at UNC's Kenan-Flagler Business School in 2010. The central theme of Kitchen's course is teaching students to create profits with a purpose. In his course students learn entrepreneurial principles by starting small businesses where profits are donated to non-profits, including Make a Wish and other charities. Kitchen's classes have given away multiple cars to people transitioning out of homelessness.

=== Travel career ===
Kitchen began traveling internationally in high school and over the past 30 years has visited all 193 countries recognized by the United Nations. He visited his 193rd country, Syria, in 2019. Kitchen is a member of the Travelers' Century Club, recognized as a Gold Member for visiting 100 or more countries.

=== Space flight ===
On March 14, 2022, Blue Origin announced that Jim Kitchen would be a member of the NS-20 mission. Pete Davidson was scheduled to be a crew member on this launch, however Davidson changed his mind. Gary Lai, the chief architect of the New Shepard rocket system replaced Pete Davidson on this space flight. On March 31, 2022, Kitchen became the first person to travel to all 193 U.N. recognized countries and go to space. Several news outlets referred to him as the “Modern Day Marco Polo” who went to space.

=== Mariana Trench ===
On July 5, 2022, Kitchen traveled in the deep diving submersible Limiting Factor to the bottom of the Mariana Trench, the deepest part of the ocean to depths between 10,925 and 10,935 meters (35,843 and 35,876 ft). The trench is located approximately 210 nautical miles to the southwest of Guam.

=== Titan submersible ===
In June 2023, Kitchen was scheduled to join an OceanGate expedition aboard the Titan submersible to the wreck of the Titanic, but he withdrew after raising safety concerns. Days later, the vessel imploded during its descent, killing all five people on board.

== See also ==
- List of people who descended to Challenger Deep
