= Benthaus =

Benthaus is a surname. Notable people with the surname include:

- Helmut Benthaus (born 1935), German football player and coach
- Michaela Benthaus (born 1991 or 1992), German aerospace engineer who became the first wheelchair user to travel to space
