= Space-based economy =

Economic activity in space

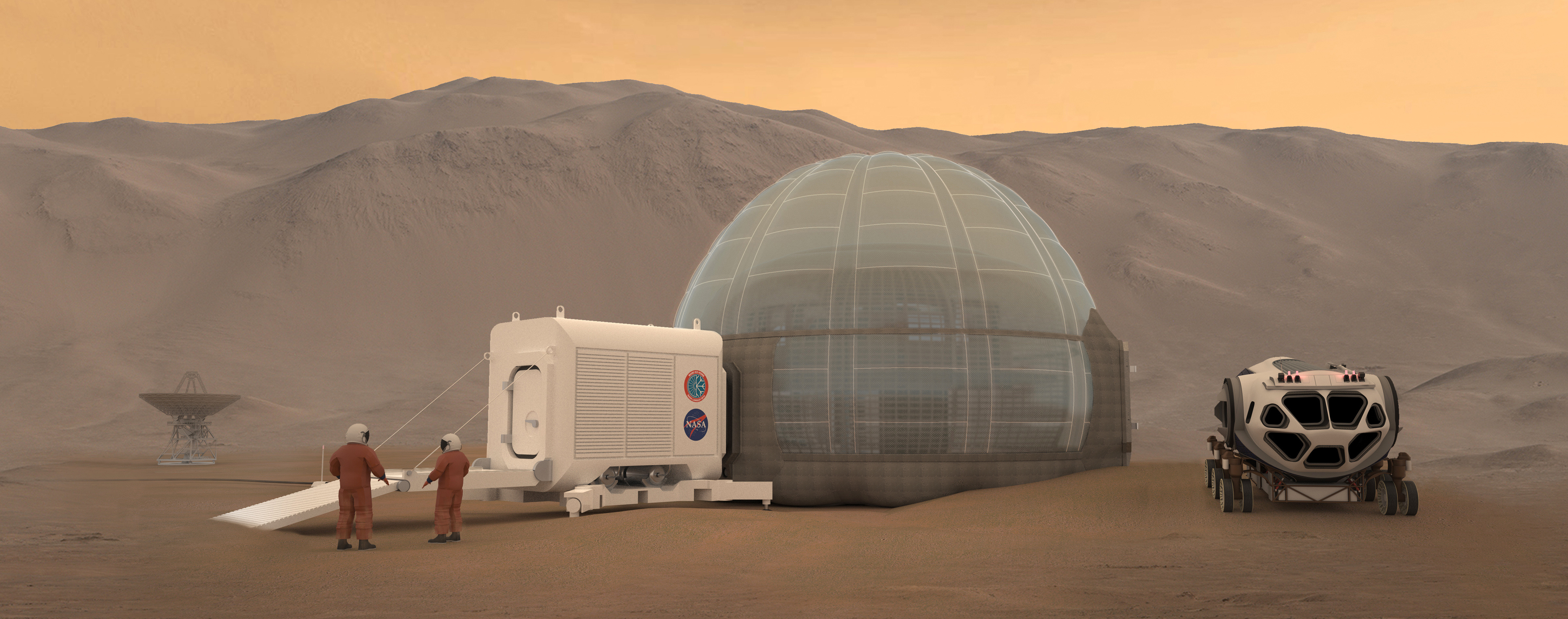
Artist's rendering of the Mars Ice Home concept. Space colonies are a common topic within space economy discussions.

Space-based economy is economic activity in outer space, including asteroid mining, space manufacturing, space trade, space burial, space advertising and construction performed in space such as the building of space stations.

Space-based industrial efforts are presently in their infancy. Most such concepts would require a considerable long-term human presence in space and relatively low-cost access to space. The majority of proposals would also require technological or engineering developments in areas such as robotics, solar energy, and life support systems.

A major catalyst in the development of a space economy has come from the rise of reusable launch vehicles and spacecraft in 2010s and the 2020s.

Some analysts have argued for creating an International Bank, to support deep space exploration.

== Law ==
The 1967 Outer Space Treaty establishes that space, as the "province of all mankind," shall be freely explored and used by all nations, and that the use of the moon and all other celestial bodies shall be for peaceful purposes.

In 2015, the U.S. Congress passed a law explicitly allowing American companies to use resources from the moon and asteroids, the Commercial Space Launch Competitiveness Act of 2015.

In April 2020, the U.S. Executive Order 13914 clarified the position of the U.S. government on the use of space resources and how the United States will foster the commercial development of space resources. “Americans should have the right to engage in commercial exploration, recovery, and use of resources in outer space,” the order states.

== See also ==
- NewSpace
- Space colonization
- Reform and opening up
- Colonization of the Moon
- Colonization of Mars
- Planetary habitability
- NASA lunar outpost concepts
- DARPA lunar programs
- In situ resource utilization
- Space architecture
- Outer space treaty
- Commercial Space Launch Competitiveness Act of 2015
