= ProofPilot =

American internet company

- Type: Clinical trial platform
- Industry: Clinical Trials; Clinical Research
- Headquarters: New York City
- Key people: Chris Venezia
- Products: ProofPilot
- Website: www.proofpilot.com

ProofPilot is an American clinical trial technology company headquartered in New York City. The platform is designed to make clinical trials simple and predictable for study sponsors, trial sites, and patients. Chris Venezia has served as the Chief Executive Officer since 2022.

== History ==
ProofPilot grew out of the consulting firm Cyclogram in 2013. Cyclogram was started by Matthew Amsden in 2005.

Early versions of the platform supported studies in the United States, Brazil and Peru. ProofPilot participated in the BluePrint Health Incubator program in the winter of 2014.

Under the leadership of Chris Venezia, who joined in 2022, ProofPilot repositioned its platform from a study design and protocol automation tool to a comprehensive clinical experience platform focused on trial planning, site activation, recruitment and enrollment, and patient and site engagement.

In September 2025, ProofPilot acquired Lokavant, a clinical trial intelligence company originally spun out of Roivant in 2020. Lokavant's technology leveraged historical and real-time data to deliver predictive insights and optimize study feasibility. The acquisition combined ProofPilot's trial execution platform with Lokavant's predictive analytics capabilities.

== Platform ==
The ProofPilot platform is organized around four core areas of clinical operations:

- Planning: Data-driven enrollment forecasting that enables sponsors to model realistic scenarios and assess enrollment risk earlier in the study lifecycle.
- Activation: Site activation support including flexible staff training modules, document exchange, and study startup planning.
- Enrollment: A suite of digital recruitment tools including sponsor-branded clinical trial websites, recruitment technology integrations, and enrollment optimization.
- Engagement: Patient and site engagement tools including visit overviews, instructional content, and streamlined communication features.

== Compliance ==
ProofPilot maintains compliance with several industry and regulatory standards, including CCPA, 21 CFR Part 11, GDPR, HIPAA, and SOC 2 Type 1. The company also states that its platform meets GxP compliance requirements for clinical trial technology.

== Awards ==
ProofPilot has received several industry recognitions, including Citeline Awards for Best Patient-Facing Technology and Clinical Partnership in 2024, and a Clinical Trials Arena Excellence Award in 2023.

== Industry Partnerships ==
ProofPilot is a Global Impact Partner of the Society for Clinical Research Sites (SCRS) and a featured contributor to the SCRS “Cut >25” initiative, which aims to reduce redundant site training burden by more than 25%. The company also maintains collaborations with other clinical research industry organizations.

== See also ==
- Medidata Solutions
