= Blue Origin NS-37 =

2025 sub-orbital human spaceflight

- Mission type: Sub-orbital human spaceflight
- Mission duration: 10 minutes, 26 seconds
- Apogee: 106 km (66 mi)

Spacecraft properties
- Spacecraft: RSS Kármán Line
- Manufacturer: Blue Origin

Crew
- Crew size: 6
- Members: Michaela Benthaus; Joey Hyde; Hans Koenigsmann; Neal Milch; Adonis Pouroulis; Jason Stansell

Start of mission
- Launch date: 20 December 2025, 14:15:00 UTC
- Rocket: New Shepard (NS5)
- Launch site: Corn Ranch, West Texas
- Contractor: Blue Origin

End of mission
- Landing date: 20 December 2025, 14:25:26 UTC
- Landing site: Corn Ranch
- Blue Origin NS-37 mission patch New Shepard flights

Blue Origin NS-37 was a sub-orbital spaceflight operated by Blue Origin as part of its New Shepard space tourism program. The mission launched from Launch Site One in West Texas on December 20, 2025, with the exact liftoff time determined by the launch window. The live webcast began roughly 40 minutes before launch. The flight was expected to last approximately 10–12 minutes, carrying six passengers to an apogee above the Kármán line, the internationally recognized boundary of space.

The crew includes aerospace engineer Michaela Benthaus, who has used a wheelchair since suffering a spinal cord injury in a 2018 mountain-biking accident, physicist Joey Hyde, aerospace engineer Hans Koenigsmann, business executive Neal Milch, entrepreneur Adonis Pouroulis, and space enthusiast Jason Stansell.

== Crew ==
Position	Passenger
Tourist	(United States) Neal Milch; First spaceflight
Tourist	(Germany) Michaela Benthaus; First spaceflight
Tourist	(Germany) (United States) Hans Koenigsmann; First spaceflight
Tourist	(South Africa) Adonis Pouroulis; First spaceflight
Tourist	(United States) Jason Stansell; First spaceflight
Tourist	(United States) Joey Hyde; First spaceflight
