= DARPA lunar programs =

United States Lunar programs

The DARPA lunar programs, are a series of programs aimed at developing shareable, scalable commercial systems for a lunar economy developed by U.S. agency DARPA. Recognizing the recent advances in lunar exploration, DARPA envisions a cislunar and lunar economy of scientific research and commercial development over the next decade. Since 2023, two programs have been launched.

== Lunar Guidelines for Infrastructure Consortium (LOGIC) ==
LOGIC intends to bring industry, academia, and government together to identify critical lunar infrastructure interoperability and interface needs for commercial lunar infrastructure.

In October 2023, the Johns Hopkins University (JHU) Applied Physics Laboratory (APL) was selected to administer LOGIC as a permanent, self-sustaining, and independent forum for collaboration.

== 10-Year Lunar Architecture (LunA-10) ==
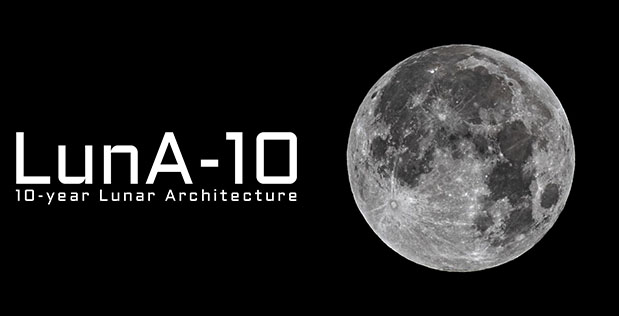

Announced in August 2023, LunA-10 will conduct a seven-month capability study to create core technology concepts toward a series set of adaptable, expandable systems that can work together and be shared, “minimizing lunar footprint and creating monetizable services for future lunar users.” The study is tailored to capabilities for commercial and economic uses, and will not be for military applications.

The LunA-10 study’s focus areas are based on key sectors identified in a report titled “Lunar market assessment: market trends and challenges in the development of a lunar economy” by PwC Australia in September 2021. Transit/mobility, energy, and communications are the three areas LunA-10 sees as forming the foundation of any other lunar industries. Industries that may integrate technologies into the LunA-10 infrastructure include construction, mining, medicine, sciences, communications, etc. In December 2023, 14 companies were funded to complete the study by June 2024 about the necessary infrastructure and capabilities required to develop a moon-based economy over the next ten years. They include Blue Origin, CisLunar Industries, Crescent Space Services, Fibertek, Inc., Firefly Aerospace, GITAI, Helios, Honeybee Robotics, ICON, Nokia of America, Northrop Grumman, Redwire Corporation, Sierra Space and SpaceX. For example, aerospace company Northrop Grumman will provide a conceptual study of a “lunar railroad” network for commercial ventures.

NASA has been working on a detailed architecture for lunar and Martian exploration. DARPA has coordinated with NASA to make LunA-10 complementary to NASA architecture studies.

An update on the program occurred in April 2024. With industry participants providing insight on how a lunar economy could be operationalized. Many proposals relied on the viability of in-situ resource utilization and low enough launch costs.

== Novel Orbital and Moon Manufacturing, Materials, and Mass-efficient Design (NOM4D) ==
In 2022, DARPA kicked off NOM4D (pronounced “nomad”) to explore using lightweight raw materials that can be transformed and assembled once they reach orbit. NOM4D complements other initiatives such as LOGIC and LunA-10.

The initiative is to overcome the challenges of assembling large-scale structures in orbit by testing new in-space manufacturing capabilities. In February 2025, DARPA shifted the final phase of NOM4D from laboratory experiments to small-scale orbital demonstrations.

One of NOM4D's long-term objectives is to develop 100-meter-wide space-based antennas to enhance situational awareness in the cislunar region between Earth and the Moon during crewed lunar exploration missions.

== See also ==
- Colonization of the Moon
- NASA lunar outpost concepts
- Lunar Architecture (NASA)
- Space architecture
- Exploration Systems Architecture Study
- Moon Treaty
- Outer Space Treaty
- Lunar resources
- Space industry
- Demonstration Rocket for Agile Cislunar Operations (DRACO)
