= Blue Origin NS-20 =

2022 American crewed sub-orbital spaceflight

- Mission type: Sub-orbital human spaceflight
- Mission duration: 10 minutes, 4 seconds
- Apogee: 107 km (66 mi)

Spacecraft properties
- Spacecraft: RSS First Step
- Manufacturer: Blue Origin

Crew
- Crew size: 6
- Members: Marty Allen; Sharon Hagle; Marc Hagle; Jim Kitchen; George Nield; Gary Lai

Start of mission
- Launch date: 31 March 2022, 8:57:55 am CDT (13:57:55 UTC)
- Rocket: New Shepard (NS4)
- Launch site: Corn Ranch, LS-1
- Contractor: Blue Origin

End of mission
- Landing date: 31 March 2022, 9:07:59 am CDT (14:07:59 UTC)
- Landing site: Corn Ranch
- Blue Origin NS-20 mission patch New Shepard flights

Blue Origin NS-20 was a sub-orbital spaceflight mission operated by Blue Origin, which launched on 31 March 2022 using the New Shepard rocket. With six people on board, it was Blue Origin's fourth flight with passengers, and twentieth flight overall to reach space.

The flight was originally scheduled to launch on 23 March, but was later postponed to 29 March, and then again to 31 March. American comedian Pete Davidson was expected to fly on board, but was unable to due to the launch date change. It was later announced that Blue Origin employee Gary Lai, chief architect of Blue Origin's New Shepard vehicle, would replace Davidson. Apart from Lai, the five other participants of the flight were paying passengers.

== Passengers ==
The passengers of NS-20 were nicknamed the "Roaring Twenties".

Position	Passenger
Tourist	(United States) Gary Lai; First spaceflight
Tourist	(United States) George Nield; First spaceflight
Tourist	(United States) Jim Kitchen; First spaceflight
Tourist	(United States) Marty Allen; First spaceflight
Tourist	(United States) Sharon Hagle; First spaceflight
Tourist	(United States) Marc Hagle; First spaceflight
