= Blue Origin NS-18 =

2021 American crewed sub-orbital spaceflight

- Mission type: Sub-orbital human spaceflight
- Operator: Blue Origin
- Mission duration: 10 minutes, 17 seconds
- Apogee: 107 km (66 mi)

Spacecraft properties
- Spacecraft: RSS First Step
- Manufacturer: Blue Origin

Crew
- Crew size: 4
- Members: Audrey Powers; Chris Boshuizen; Glen de Vries; William Shatner

Start of mission
- Launch date: 13 October 2021, 9:49 am CDT (14:49 UTC)
- Rocket: New Shepard (NS4)
- Launch site: Corn Ranch, LS-1
- Contractor: Blue Origin

End of mission
- Landing date: 13 October 2021, 9:59 am CDT (14:59 UTC)
- Landing site: Corn Ranch
- Blue Origin NS-18 mission patch New Shepard flights

Blue Origin NS-18 was a sub-orbital spaceflight mission operated by Blue Origin that launched on 13 October 2021. The mission was the eighteenth flight of the company's New Shepard integrated launch vehicle and spacecraft. It was the second New Shepard launch to carry passengers. The flight, carrying four people including actor William Shatner, launched from Blue Origin's sub-orbital launch site in West Texas aboard the fourth flight of New Shepard booster NS4 and the spacecraft RSS First Step, both having previously flown on NS-14, NS-15, and NS-16 earlier in the year.

At 90, Shatner became the oldest person to fly into space, surpassing the record of 82 which had been held by Wally Funk for three months since her flight on Blue Origin NS-16. Per Blue Origin, Shatner was a guest of the company on the flight and did not have to pay for the trip. When Ed Dwight flew as a space tourist on the Blue Origin suborbital flight on 19 May 2024 at age 90 years, 253 days, he became the oldest person to reach space, overtaking Shatner.

While in space, Shatner experienced the overview effect and articulated it live on camera in a post-flight conversation with Blue Origin founder Jeff Bezos.

== Passengers ==
The four passengers aboard included Blue Origin's vice president of mission and flight operations Audrey Powers, former NASA engineer and third Australian-born person in space Chris Boshuizen, vice chair for life sciences and healthcare at the French software company Dassault Systèmes Glen de Vries, and Canadian actor William Shatner.

Position	Passenger
Tourist	(United States) Audrey Powers; First spaceflight
Tourist	(Canada) William Shatner; First spaceflight
Tourist	(Australia) Chris Boshuizen; First spaceflight
Tourist	(United States) Glen de Vries; Only spaceflight

== Songs for Space ==
Chris Boshuizen, who is also a musician, carried a Star Trek-themed USB drive which contained 400 songs submitted to him via a Reddit thread along with him on the trip. The USB drive was later auctioned off for charity supporting Musack, raising US$8,448. A SoundCloud playlist of all of the songs contained on the drive was created for posterity.
