= Gary Lai =

American aerospace engineer

Gary Lai is an American aerospace engineer. He was the chief architect for New Shepard, a vehicle developed by aerospace manufacturer Blue Origin for space tourism. On March 31, 2022, he flew on New Shepard's 20th mission to space, NS-20. He is a Co-Founder and the Chief Technology Officer of a company called Interlune.

== Early life and education ==
Lai was born in Hong Kong in 1973. He grew up in the New York City metro area and attended Cornell University, graduating in 1995 with a degree in Applied Economics and Business Management. He credited a class he took at Cornell with the late astronomer Carl Sagan in his senior year as steering him towards a career in engineering and space exploration. After Cornell, he attended the University of Washington and graduated with a degree in Aeronautical and Astronautical Engineering in 1999.

== Career ==
Lai worked at Kistler Aerospace in Kirkland, Washington, a company that was eventually acquired and renamed Rocketplane Kistler. At Kistler, he worked as a payload systems engineer for the K-1 launch vehicle, a project to develop a fully reusable, two-stage vehicle to launch payloads to orbit from Australia. Lai is named as a co-inventor on two of Kistler Aerospace's patents for its payload systems.

In 2004, Lai joined Blue Origin, an American aerospace manufacturer founded by Amazon founder Jeff Bezos, as one of its first 20 employees. The roles he held at Blue Origin include Senior Director of Design Engineering, System Architect, Crew Capsule Element Lead, NASA Commercial Crew Development Program Manager, Lead Systems Engineer, and Pathfinding Lead with responsibility for advanced research and development. In addition to New Shepard, Lai was involved in product development, strategic planning, and business development for other Blue Origin programs including the New Glenn orbital launch vehicle, rocket engine programs, and the Blue Moon lunar lander.

On April 14, 2021, Lai participated in NS-15, the 15th test flight of New Shepard, a rehearsal for a human spaceflight. He, along with another company employee, Audrey Powers, entered the capsule after the booster was fueled and strapped into the seats. After a few minutes, they exited the capsule and left the launch pad before the vehicle took off.

NS-15 was the last rehearsal before New Shepard's first human spaceflight, NS-16, carrying Amazon and Blue Origin founder Jeff Bezos, his brother Mark Bezos, pilot and Mercury 13 member Wally Funk, and Dutch student Oliver Daemen to suborbital space. Before NS-16, Lai was a company spokesperson on the safety systems of New Shepard, interviewed by Bloomberg Technology, CNN, the Washington Post, and other outlets. Lai co-hosted the Blue Origin live webcast of NS-16 with Ariane Cornell.

Lai subsequently flew on New Shepard himself on the NS-20 flight on March 31, 2022. The seat was originally going to be occupied by comedian Pete Davidson, but the company announced he would no longer fly and announced Lai as his replacement. Lai, unlike the other passengers, did not pay for the flight. In advance of NS-20, Blue Origin published a video on his contributions to New Shepard and his thoughts on his upcoming spaceflight, describing him as “the architect of New Shepard.”

Lai is a member of the University of Washington Department of Aeronautics and Astronautics External Advisory Board. He received a Stellar award from the RNASA Foundation in 2017 for, “Outstanding leadership of the New Shepard technical team, which performed five launches and landings of the same booster in one year.” He is credited by Blue Origin for leading the technical team that won the 2016 Collier Trophy. He received a Pathfinder Award from the Museum of Flight in 2023, given to individuals "with ties to the Pacific Northwest who have made significant contributions to the development of the aerospace industry."

During the ceremony at the Museum of Flight where he received the Pathfinder award, Lai revealed that he had co-founded a company called Interlune. Lai said the other founders include Rob Meyerson, who was Blue Origin’s president from 2003 to 2018; and Apollo 17 astronaut Harrison Schmitt, a geologist who set foot on the Moon in 1972 and served in the U.S. Senate from 1977 to 1983. Lai said, "We aim to be the first company that harvests natural resources from the moon to use here on Earth. We’re building a completely novel approach to extract those resources, efficiently, cost-effectively and also responsibly. The goal is really to create a sustainable in-space economy.”
