= Medidata Solutions =

American technology company

Medidata
- Type: Private
- Industry: Life sciences Artificial Intelligence; Clinical development technology Software as a service
- Founded: 1999; New York, NY
- Founder: Glen de Vries; Edward Ikeguchi; Tarek Sherif
- Headquarters: 350 Hudson Street, New York, NY, United States
- Area served: Worldwide
- Key people: Tarek Sherif (CEO, Chairman); Vacant (President)
- Products: Medidata Rave; Medidata Patient Cloud; Medidata Acorn AI
- Revenue: ▲$636 million (2018)
- Number of employees: 2,800 (2018)
- Parent: Dassault Systèmes
- Website: medidata.com

Medidata Solutions is an American technology company that develops and markets software as a service (SaaS) for clinical trials. Headquartered in New York City, Medidata has locations in China, Japan, Singapore, South Korea, the United Kingdom, and the United States. Medidata has been a subsidiary of Dassault Systèmes since 2019.

== Operations ==
Medidata offers a cloud-based platform for clients to build their own clinical trials and perform medical research. The platform allows physicians and scientists to collect and share clinical trial data. The company helps biopharmaceutical and medical device companies run clinical trials, and streamlines the process for life science firms designing the trials. Clients include biotechnology companies, government institutions, and contract research organizations.

The company has two primary products. Medidata Rave EDC, introduced in 2001, is a single system for electronic data capture and clinical data management, allowing client data to be accessible in one place. Medidata Rave Clinical Cloud, introduced in 2013, is a platform used for data capture and management of patient-related data for clinical operations. In February 2018, Medidata announced plans to launch virtual trials as a part of its platform's clinical trial products, allowing patients to participate remotely in drug development trials.

== History ==
In 1994, Glen de Vries and Ed Ikeguchi created OceanTek, a startup that developed Web applications for conducting clinical trials and was the precursor to Medidata. In 1999, along with Tarek Sherif, Glen de Vries and Ed Ikeguchi founded Medidata Solutions to provide online systems for designing and running clinical trials. In 2004, they completed a $10 million round of financing with Insight Venture Partners, and were later backed by investors including Milestone Venture Partners and Stonehenge Capital Fund. Ikeguchi left the company in 2008. Medidata acquired Fast Track Systems (clinical trial planning software) in 2008.

On January 26, 2009, Medidata filed to raise $86 million in an initial public offering (IPO). It made its IPO on the Nasdaq Stock Market on June 25, 2009, with its market capitalization at $313 million. It debuted on the Nasdaq at $18 per share. Medidata acquired Clinical Force (SaaS-based clinical trial management systems) in 2011, Patient Profiles (Clinical trial data quality improvement) in 2014, Intelemage (medical image sharing technology) in 2016, Chita (cloud-based content management system) and Mytrus (clinical trial technology) in 2017, and SHYFT Analytics (cloud data analytics) in 2018. In April 2019, Medidata launched Acorn AI, an AI-oriented solution based on its own trained data.

As of 2017, Medidata customers include 18 of the world's top 25 pharmaceutical companies, with clients such as Johnson & Johnson, AstraZeneca, Amgen, Cancer Research UK, GlaxoSmithKline, Novartis and Hoffmann-La Roche.

In December 2019, Medidata was acquired by Dassault Systèmes for $5.8 billion. Medidata acquired MC10 (digital biomarker technology) in 2020.

== Legal issues ==
In September 2014, Medidata discovered that it had been the victim of a fraudulently induced transfer of nearly $4.8 million. The company filed an insurance claim for its loss, which was denied by its insurer, Federal Insurance Co., a subsidiary of Chubb Ltd. The insurer claimed that its policy only covered losses resulting from fraudulent entry or hacking into a computer system and that in this case the transfer was voluntary, while Medidata argued that the thief's actions did come within the policy's definition of covered losses. On July 21, 2017, a federal court in New York ruled that Medidata was entitled to coverage from Federal Insurance for the $4.8 million loss. Federal Insurance's appeal is pending.

On January 26, 2017, Medidata filed a lawsuit in federal court in New York against five former employees and Veeva Systems Inc., in which it accused Veeva of trade secret theft. The complaint alleges that Veeva induced former Medidata employees to reveal confidential information and trade secrets that belong to Medidata. On August 16, 2017, the court denied Veeva's motion to compel arbitration, and on September 20, 2017, Medidata filed its Second Amended Complaint, which names Veeva as the only defendant. The case is ongoing.

== Rankings ==
- 2017: #11 on Fortune magazine's Fortune Future 50 list
- 2017: #51 on Fortune 100 Fastest Growing Companies list
- 2017: #59 on Forbes' list of Most Innovative Growth Companies
- 2018: #70 on Barron's 100 Most Sustainable Companies list

== See also ==
- Clinical Research IO
