= Hans Koenigsmann =

German aerospace engineer (born 1963)

Hans J. Königsmann
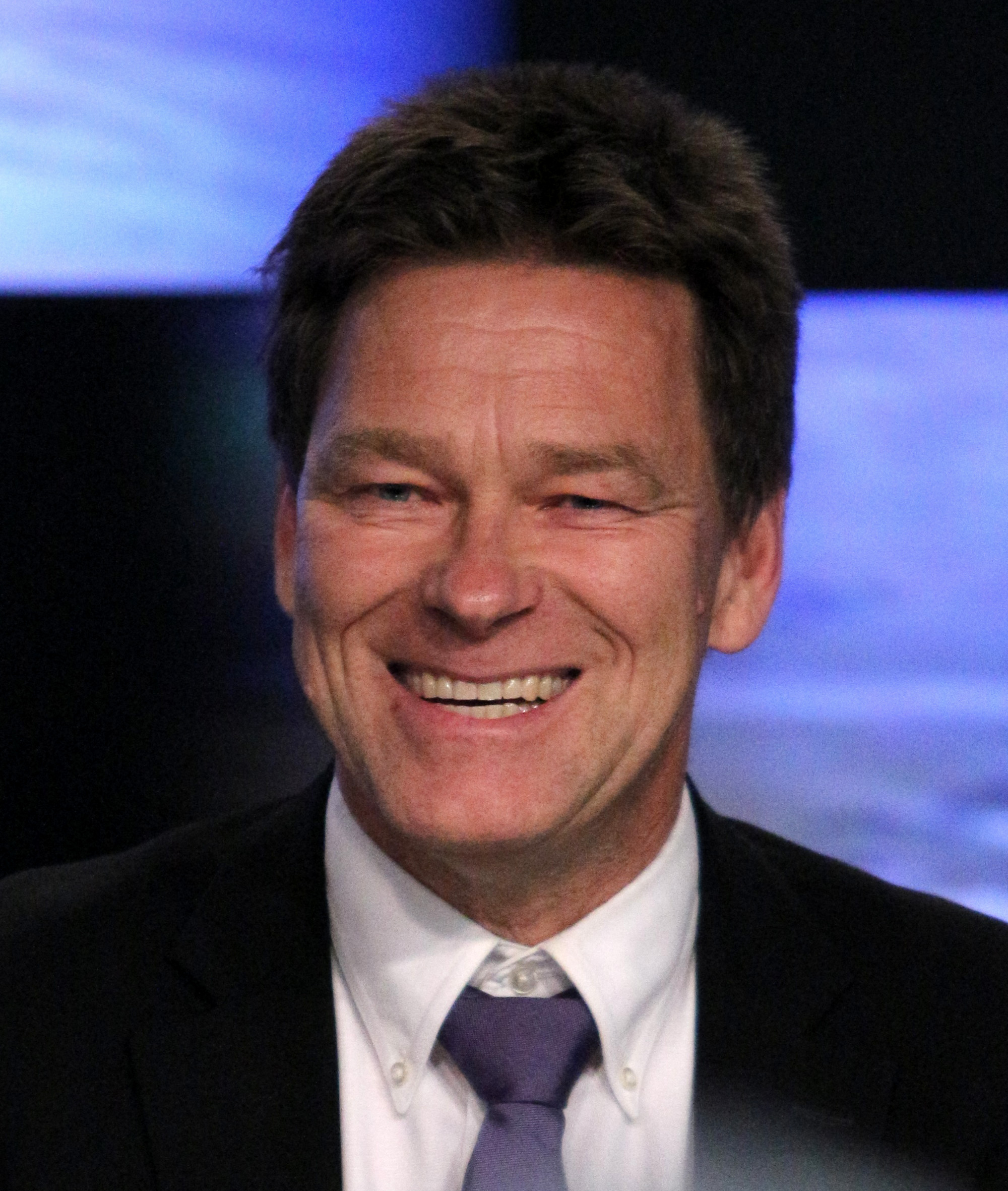
- Born: 1963 (age 62–63)
- Education: Technische Universität Berlin (Dipl.-Ing.), University of Bremen (Dr.-Ing.)
- Awards: NASA Distinguished Public Service Medal (2014)
- Scientific career
- Fields: Aerospace engineering
- Workplaces: SpaceX
- Thesis: Magnetische Lageregelung von Kleinsatelliten in niedrigen Höhen (1995)

Hans-Jörg Königsmann (born 1963) is a German aerospace engineer who was Vice President of Flight Reliability for SpaceX until his retirement in 2021.

== Education and career ==
Hans Königsmann obtained his aerospace engineering diploma at Technische Universität Berlin in 1989, followed by a PhD in Aerospace Engineering and Production Technology at the University of Bremen in 1995.

He began working at the Center of Applied Space Technology and Microgravity at the University of Bremen, where he was in charge of avionics and later management of the BremSat satellite. After successful launch and the end of the project one year later, he emigrated to California to work for the satellite manufacturer Microcosm Inc. He met Elon Musk at a rocket launch in the Mojave Desert.

In 2002 Königsmann became the fourth technical employee for the newly-founded SpaceX. He was part of the launch team starting as VP of Avionics, then from the third Falcon 1 flight forward was the Launch Chief Engineer. SpaceX promoted him to Vice President of Flight Reliability in 2011 making him responsible for the safe completion of SpaceX missions. Koenigsmann announced his retirement from SpaceX in January 2021.

Königsmann has been a member of Bremen based space and technology company OHB SE's Supervisory Board since June 24, 2022. Königsmann is also operating as an advisor for the Seattle based rocket company startup Stoke Space.

Königsmann joined the sub-orbital spaceflight Blue Origin NS-37 as one of six crew members, alongside Michaela Benthaus. Benthaus contacted Königsmann to examine the possibility becoming an astronaut as a wheelchair user, which Königsmann cited as his inspiration to join the flight himself. On December 20 2025, the 10 minute flight launched from West Texas at 9:15 a.m. EST. and reached 65 miles in altitude, passing the Kármán line which is some 62 miles above the Earth.

== Honors ==
- Hans Königsmann was awarded the NASA Distinguished Public Service Medal in 2014. It is the highest form of recognition by NASA for non-Government individuals.

== Published works ==
- Königsmann, Hans-Jörg (1995). Magnetische Lageregelung von Kleinsatelliten in niedrigen Höhen [Magnetic position control of small satellites at low altitudes] (Dissertation) (in German). Bremen.
