= Michaela Benthaus =

German aerospace engineer

- Born: 1991 or 1992 (age 33–34)
- Education: Johannes Kepler University Linz Technical University of Munich
- Known for: First wheelchair user to travel to space
- Scientific career
- Fields: mechatronics and aerospace engineering
- Workplaces: European Space Agency

Michaela "Michi" Benthaus is a German aerospace engineer who became the first wheelchair user to travel to space. She works for the European Space Agency.

== Early life and education ==
Benthaus received her early education from the Nymphenburg schools in Munich, Bavaria. She then went on to study mechatronics for her Bachelor's degree at Johannes Kepler University Linz, followed by a Master's degree in aerospace engineering at the Technical University of Munich with focus on space and astrophysics.

In 2018, Benthaus suffered a spinal cord injury during a mountain biking accident, which left her with paraplegia at the age of 26. Since then, she has been a full time wheelchair user.

== Career ==
Benthaus was enrolled in the graduate trainee program of the European Space Agency in the Netherlands.

In 2022, Benthaus flew aboard a parabolic airplane flight named the Vomit Comet, which provides an environment of near-weightlessness for a brief period. In 2024, she took part in a two-week simulated astronaut mission in Poland.

In 2025, Benthaus was accompanied by fellow German engineer Hans Koenigsmann in her mission to fly in outer space. Benthaus herself reached out to Hans Koenigsmann to examine the possibility of whether she could realise her dream of becoming an astronaut.

Benthaus joined the sub-orbital spaceflight Blue Origin NS-37 as one of six crew members, with her trip financed by Jeff Bezos's Blue Origin. On December 20, 2025, the 10 minute flight launched from West Texas at 9:15 a.m. EST. and reached 106 kilometres (66 mi) in altitude, passing the Kármán line at 100 km altitude. Benthaus became the first wheelchair user to reach space aboard a sub-orbital flight.

Benthaus also advocated for the equal rights and increased inclusion of individuals with physical disabilities. After successfully entering space, she emphasized that more initiatives had to be put in place to give more space for disabled people to shine in their preferred areas of interest. Benthaus is also known for her humanitarian efforts, as the event of her spaceflight raised money for "Wings for Life", a nonprofit organization focusing on spinal cord injury research.

On 6 March 2026, Benthaus was invited to speak alongside ESA astronaut Sophie Adenot at the 2026 Winter Paralympics opening ceremony.

== Personal life ==
Benthaus' interest in space began in childhood when she watched movies such as Star Wars. She plays wheelchair tennis during her leisure time.
