= Dave Limp =

American business executive

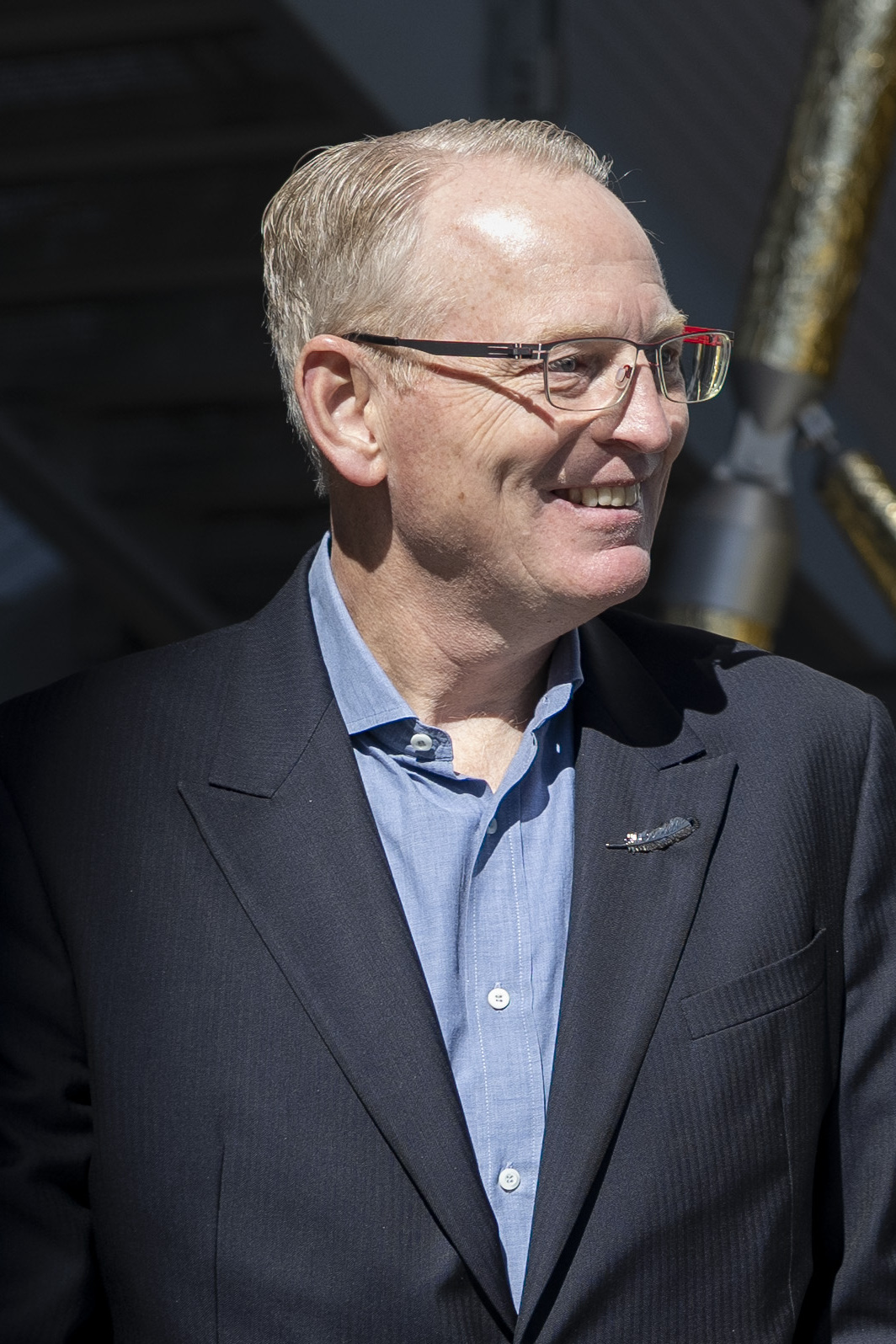
- Limp in 2026
- Born: 1966 (age 59–60); Fort Leonard Wood, Missouri, U.S.
- Citizenship: American
- Education: Vanderbilt University (BA), Stanford University (MBA)
- Occupation: Business executive
- Known for: CEO of Blue Origin
- Predecessor: Bob Smith
- Spouse: Danielle Wigglesworth Limp
- Children: 3

Dave Limp (born 1966) is an American business executive who is the CEO of Blue Origin as of 2024. Prior to joining Blue Origin, Limp held various executive roles at Amazon and Apple.

== Career ==
Limp has been a venture partner of Azure Capital Partners. He has also been executive vice president and chief strategy officer of Liberate Technologies.

Limp worked at Apple for about ten years.

=== Amazon ===
He joined Amazon in 2010. At Amazon, as Senior Vice President of Devices and Services, Limp's responsibilities included the Amazon Alexa (Alexa) voice assistant, Amazon Echo (Echo) speakers, Amazon Kindle (Kindle) devices, Amazon Astro (Astro) home robots, and Amazon Fire gadgets. Limp also oversaw Amazon's subsidiary Project Kuiper which is planning to provide satellite-based broadband internet access using a large satellite internet constellation.

Amazon continued its rapid pace of launching new devices and services under Limp as the head of the hardware division.

The hardware division under Limp was among those affected by the layoffs of approximately 10,000 employees in November 2022.

Limp was involved with acquisitions of several consumer hardware companies while at Amazon including Eero (involved in routers and networking hardware), Ring and Blink (both of which are involved in security cameras). The planned takeover of iRobot (most famous for Roomba), however, failed because of antitrust objections by the European Commission.

Limp was at Amazon for more than 13 years.

=== Blue Origin ===
At Blue Origin, Limp's charges include the development of the company's New Glenn heavy-lift rocket — which will power NASA's low-cost EscaPADE mission to Mars — and the Human Landing System as part of NASA's Artemis Moon exploration program.

Limp is known to be trusted by Jeff Bezos, the founder of Amazon as well as Blue Origin. Limp decided to join Blue Origin as CEO after Bezos proposed it to him. Although Limp's initial feeling was that he didn't know a lot about rockets, Bezos convinced Limp over a couple of months.
