= Glen de Vries =

American businessman (1972–2021)

- Born: June 29, 1972; New York, U.S.
- Died: November 11, 2021 (aged 49); Hampton Township, New Jersey, U.S.
- Education: Carnegie Mellon University
- Occupation: Businessman
- Known for: Founder of Medidata Solutions; Space tourist (Blue Origin NS-18 suborbital flight)

Glen de Vries (June 29, 1972 – November 11, 2021) was an American entrepreneur in the field of medical science and pharmacology. He was the co-founder and co-CEO of Medidata Solutions. In October 2021, de Vries flew into space on Blue Origin NS-18 in a suborbital flight.

== Early life and education ==
De Vries grew up in New York and showed a passion for computers and science at a young age. In middle school, he founded a rocket club in the science lab. He attended the Ethical Culture Fieldston School in Manhattan and the Bronx, NY. His mother encouraged him to learn ballroom dancing in high school, and he danced competitively with her. De Vries attended Carnegie Mellon University and graduated in 1994. He taught himself to speak Japanese.

De Vries received his undergraduate degree in molecular biology and genetics from Carnegie Mellon University, worked as a research scientist at the Columbia Presbyterian Medical Center, and studied computer science at New York University's Courant Institute of Mathematics.

== Career ==
In 1994, Glen de Vries and Ed Ikeguchi created OceanTek, a startup that developed Web applications for conducting clinical trials. In 1999, along with Tarek Sherif, de Vries and Ed Ikeguchi founded Medidata Solutions to provide online systems for designing and running clinical trials. Medidata made its IPO on the Nasdaq Stock Market on June 25, 2009.

In 2013, he endowed the first student fellowship of NYU Center for Data Science, the Glen de Vries Permanent Fellowship Fund.

De Vries sold Medidata to Dassault Systèmes in 2019 for $5.8 billion.

== Blue Origin flight ==
On October 13, 2021, de Vries accompanied actor William Shatner and two tourists on a New Shepard launch vehicle as part of the Blue Origin NS-18 suborbital flight into outer space.

== Death ==
De Vries was killed in the crash of a Cessna 172 in a heavily wooded area outside Hampton Township, New Jersey, on November 11, 2021, at the age of 49. He was a certified private pilot with an instrument rating. The plane's other occupant, Thomas Fischer, also died in the crash. The cause of the crash was not identified. The National Transportation Safety Board found no mechanical issue or meteorological reason that could explain it. De Vries was reportedly en route to Branchville, even though it has no airport. Authorities lost track of the plane during its fatal descent.

As a tribute, his initials were added to the mission patch of Blue Origin's crewed flight Blue Origin NS-19, which took place on December 11, 2021. In October 2023, his collection of rare luxury watches was auctioned.

== Published work ==
- de Vries, Glen; Blachman, Jeremy (2020). The patient equation: the data-driven future of precision medicine and the business of health care. New Jersey: Wiley. ISBN 978-1119622147.
