= Audrey Powers =

American aerospace executive

Audrey Powers is the vice president of mission and flight operations of American aerospace and spaceflight company Blue Origin. On October 13, 2021, Powers accompanied William Shatner along with two other space tourists on a New Shepard rocket as part of the Blue Origin NS-18 mission into space.

She received a Bachelor’s degree in Aeronautical and Astronautical engineering from Purdue University and worked then as an engineer. As a guidance and controls engineer, she was a flight controller for NASA with 2000 hours of console time in Mission Control for the International Space Station Program. While supporting government satellite programs for Lockheed Martin, Ms. Powers received a Juris Doctor in 2008 from Santa Clara University School of Law. She currently works as a lawyer.
