= 1978–1980 ABC Paulista strikes =

Series of workers' protests in São Paulo, Brazil

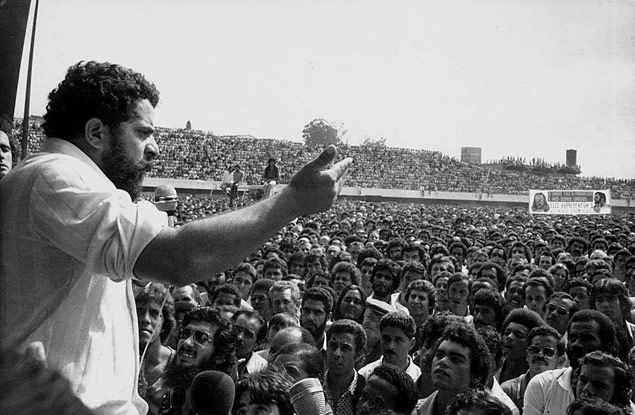
Luiz Inácio Lula da Silva speaking at a strike of metalworkers in the ABC Paulista, May 1979

The 1978–1980 ABC Paulista strikes were a series of workers' protests that took place in the ABC Region of Brazil, in the context of the redemocratization of Brazil. The strikes marked a resurgence of the Brazilian labor movement after its repression by the military dictatorship between 1968 and 1972.

The strike movement began in 1978 with a series of spontaneous work stoppages in the cities of the ABC Region, especially in the metalworkers' sector. The strikers protested pay-cut policies and demanded independent and autonomous trade unions. After this strike, the labor movement continued to mobilize; the initial strikes were continued and expanded with strikes by metalworkers in 1979 and 1980, as well as among other groups across Brazil (such as bank workers, oil workers, and teachers).

The strikes of 1978–1980 marked the emergence of a new unionism in Brazil, characterized by the types of organization that developed among grassroots workers. These new organizations had both union ties and associations with a network of worker community organizations – especially the Basic Ecclesial Communities (Comunidades Eclesiais de Base - CEBs). The strikes were also characterized by the rise of new union leaders, such as Luiz Inácio Lula da Silva.

Among the working class, particularly those politically opposed to the military regime, the emergence of this new unionism introduced demands whose achievement required the liberalization of institutions. This culminated in the 1980s with the formation of the Workers' Party (Partido dos Trabalhadores - PT) and inter-union umbrella organizations such as the Unified Workers' Central (Central Única dos Trabalhadores - CUT) and the General Confederation of Workers (Confederação Geral dos Trabalhadores - CGT).

== Context ==
=== Economic climate ===
The early 1960s marked the end of an accelerated growth period of the Brazilian economy, which had been experiencing an average annual growth rate of 6.3%. The import substitution industrialization development model, predominant since the end of World War II, had lost its dynamism, and between 1963 and 1967 Brazil's economic growth decreased by half. After the 1964 coup, Castelo Branco appointed notable liberals to direct economic policy, among them Octavio Gouvêa de Bulhões and Roberto Campos. The new economic team gave priority to fighting inflation and reducing the public deficit through the Government Economic Action Plan (Plano de Ação Econômica do Governo - PAEG), which declared the acceleration of the country's pace of economic development and containment of inflationary pressures to achieve price equilibrium as its main objective for the 1965–1966 biennium.

To accomplish this objective, a number of measures were imposed such as the release of suppressed prices from public tariffs, the reformulation of credit policies, a fiscal reform that replaced cascading taxes by value-added taxes, a monetary correction, the creation of the National Treasury Readjustable Bonds (Obrigações Reajustáveis do Tesouro Nacional - ORTN), and the creation of incentive mechanisms for exports, such as tax exemptions on profits from such exports. Labor reforms were also introduced, so that wage adjustments would not generate more inflationary pressure.

The formula adopted in the wage adjustment policy would be based on the recomposition of inflation losses and on the incorporation of the economy's productivity increase to salaries. Furthermore, the hiring and dismissal of labor were made more flexible, replacing severance payments by the employer with the Length-of-Service Guarantee Fund (Fundo de Garantia do Tempo de Serviço - FGTS). This wage restraint was an important element in the subsequent conjuncture of economic growth, which had as one of its characteristics the increase of income concentration, benefiting mainly the urban middle and upper classes. However, the living standards of industrial workers had deteriorated; if one compares wage adjustments with the increase in the cost of living between 1965 and 1967, there was a decrease of at least 25% in real wages, in addition to the intensification of working hours.

The fiscal, credit and labor reforms were considered necessary to overcome the inflationary problem and create adequate conditions for the private sector to promote the resumption of economic development under Branco's leadership. These policies, when paired with the external context of world economic growth and foreign capital investment, would see Brazil into a new period of economic growth based on the expanding domestic demand for durable consumer goods. Thanks to the concentration of income and financial mechanisms which facilitated the expansion of consumer credit as well as new demand thanks to the liberalization of international trade and to export subsidization, and a significant influx of foreign resources that complemented domestic savings, inflationary pressure was eliminated and the nation's import capacity became highly elastic. Between 1968 and 1973, Brazil grew about 10% per year.

The turbulent scenario generated by the oil crisis in 1973, however, brought with it a long period in which the world economy remained much more hostile to the growth of developing countries such as Brazil. In 1974, the trade balance deficit reached about 4.5 billion dollars, with a high number of imports and low exports due to the conditions of the international market. This also led to an increase in foreign debt. The military regime manipulated the inflation rates in 1973, masking the true cost of living and harming salaried workers by doing so, this was one of the main motivators of the strike movement started in 1978.

=== Political opening ===
With the economic crisis beginning in 1973, the military regime was already beginning to show signs of wear. Ernesto Geisel succeeded Emílio Médici in a period of adjustment and redefinition of priorities, severe foreign debt, performance fluctuations, inflationary difficulties and recession, and the Brazilian Democratic Movement (Movimento Democrático Brasileiro - MDB), the only political opposition party, grew and won a significant electoral victory in 1974, gathering around itself several sectors of organized civil society in favor of the regime's opening. There was growing opposition to the regime not only from workers, the student movement and progressive segments of the Church, but also from the middle class, and around 1977, important segments of the business community declared themselves in favor of the re-democratization of political institutions as a necessary requirement for further economic development. The arrival of Jimmy Carter in the White House in 1977 also made the political-economic sustainability of the military government difficult, since Carter was the first president since the assassination of John F. Kennedy in 1963 who did not give full U.S. support to authoritarian anti-communist regimes in Latin America.

One of the government's strategies to face the moment of crisis was to establish a way to gradually soften the regime, in a movement of "slow, gradual and secure" distension. A process of transition to democracy was slowly initiated, which should include basic guarantees for the regime, avoiding the return of pre-1964 political leaders, institutions and parties. This would take about ten years, implying the choice of Geisel's successor still by the military regime and culminating in the drafting of a new constitution. Some important measures were taken under the Geisel government, such as the suppression of Institutional Act Number Five (Ato Institucional No 5 - AI-5) and the end of press censorship. However, the scope and pace of the opening fell far short of what the opposition wanted. Faced with demands for reforms and shaken by growing tensions within the government supporting alliance, in 1979, with the inauguration of João Figueiredo, the regime would undertake a process of amnesty and restoration of democratic institutions.

Within the opposition groups, the workers' movement that erupted in 1978 in the ABC Paulista area took a more militant position, together with the student movement, assuming as its banner the demand for an immediate return to democracy. The open confrontation between workers and the State forced other opposition groups, particularly the Church and MDB politicians, to take a position regarding the legitimacy of the collective actions confronting the State. Although the government often warned that workers' agitation could jeopardize the democratic opening, unions continued to attack the regime through struggles for better economic conditions. Around 1980, during the long strike of the ABC metalworkers, both the Church and the MDB were compelled to openly support the strikes that were considered illegal.

== Background ==
After the military coup, many unions suffered intervention and lost their potential to claim, once the State became responsible for defining the rates of wage increases, and Law No. 4.330, which regulated the right to strike, imposed severe restrictions that practically impeded the deflagration of strike movements. With the increase of repression after the decree of AI-5 in 1968, the labor movement entered into a period of reflux. However, the cassations of the leadership linked to the Brazilian Communist Party (Partido Comunista Brasileiro - PCB) and the Brazilian Labor Party (Partido Trabalhista Brasileiro - PTB) made possible the rise of new union leadership, such as Luiz Inácio Lula da Silva, without ties to the hitherto traditional leftist parties and groups.

Already in the early 1970s, there were strike action attempts in the ABC region, one of them triggered at Mercedes-Benz and another at Ford's tool shop, both discouraged by the ABC Metalworkers Union, at the time led by Paulo Vidal. At Villares Metals S.A., in 1973, a strike of unique characteristics occurred, where the workers carried out a pendular movement of paralysis and resumption of work, leaving the employer unable to prevent its outbreak.

A more timid union action slowly started a process of approximation of the union leaderships with the grassroots. In the 1970s wage campaign, for example, the São Bernardo and Diadema Metalworkers Unions separated themselves from the São Paulo Metalworkers Federation and tried to develop their campaign in an autonomous way, because it was thought that some of the demands from the automobile industry were diluted when added to the ones from the other unions of the interior of the state. (Note: The wage indices were negotiated between the São Paulo Metalworkers Federation and the Federation of Industries of the State of São Paulo (FIESP), in an agreement valid for the entire category.) In the 1973 wage campaign, it was claimed a 38% readjustment, an index which was based on studies by the Statistics and Socioeconomic Studies Intersyndicate Department (Departamento Intersindical de Estatística e Estudos Socioeconômicos - DIEESE), again seeking a dissent separately from the Federation, without success. In the following year, the claim that took into account the productivity of the automobile industry was present with more emphasis. Also held in 1974 was the I São Bernardo Metalworkers Congress, where the theme of productivity and the high profit rates of the automobile industry were related to the increase of the work rhythm, the extension of the daily work day and the high turnover of the work force, as well as guiding the fight for union freedom.

In the 1975 wage campaign, with Lula already elected as the union's president, the collective bargaining agenda was raised. In the following year, for the first time, the union obtained some claims in the Superior Labor Court (Tribunal Superior do Trabalho - TST), valid for the metalworkers of São Bernardo do Campo and Diadema; and held the II São Bernardo Metalworkers Congress, reaffirming and deepening some of the guidelines raised in the last Congress, in 1974, as the right of free negotiation between employers and employees, the reduction of the working hours, recognition of the union delegates and the organization of factory commissions. In 1977, despite the mobilizations generated by the wage campaign and the disposition of the unions' board of directors in keeping it autonomous and separated from the Federation, the result of the negotiations validated the official index signed between the Federation of Industries of the State of São Paulo (Federação das Indústrias do Estado de São Paulo - FIESP) and the Metalworkers Federation. In the same year, the companies hardened their employment policy, with significant layoffs, which further strained the relations between the industrialists and the union.

== Striking movement ==
=== Partial strikes of 1978 ===
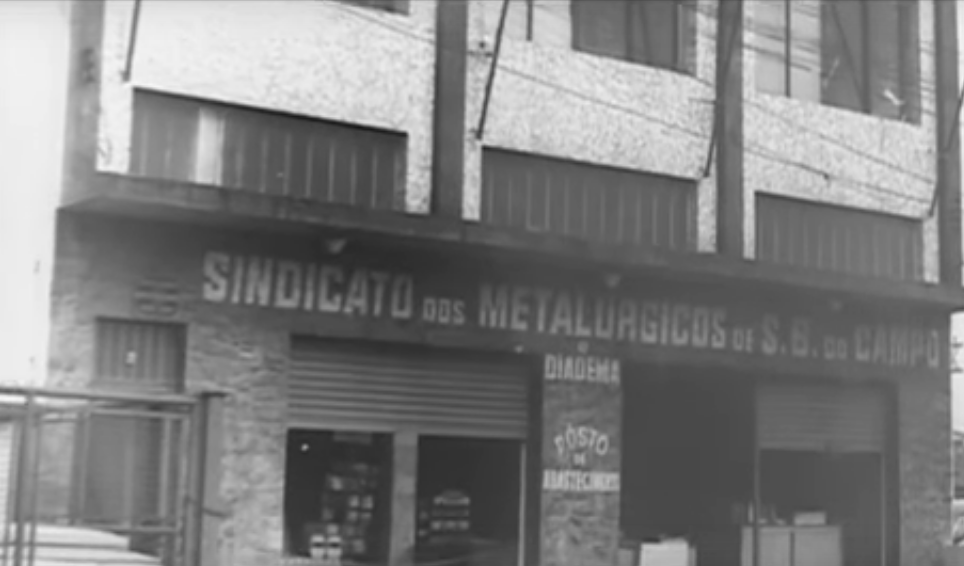
São Bernardo do Campo Metalworkers Union building

The denunciation that the military regime, in 1973, had masked the inflation indexes, damaging the metalworkers' wages in 34.1%, was the motivation for the São Bernardo Metalworkers Union to start a campaign aiming the replacement of the 1973 indexes. This campaign gave more impetus to the union to continue the mobilization work with the workers' bases, intensifying the campaign against the low wages and denouncing the policies of wage reduction practiced by the military regime. Faced with the refusal of the businessmen and the State to negotiate the replacement, ratifying the official indexes in agreement with the Metalworkers' Federation, workers from several factories went on strike. At the end of March, Mercedes-Benz employees stopped working because they had not received the raise the company used to give. The development of the strike in various sectors of the plant led to the dismissal of seventeen workers, causing the movement to decay. On May 12, workers at Saab-Scania went on strike, based on a spontaneous decision by themselves, who were unhappy with the perceived rates, which turned out to be even lower than the official rate (39%), because they came stripped of the anticipations. The day shift at the tool shop, during the change of shifts from night to day, entered the factory and did not turn on the machines, stopping production and demanding a 20% wage increase. The strike of May 12 took the union by surprise, extending over four days. The union was soon called in to carry out negotiations with the company, reaching a verbal agreement, not formalized, with Scania's management, meeting the demands of the metalworkers. Under pressure from other sectors of the automotive industry, Scania ended up not keeping the agreement, changing the 20% of the demands for a 6.5% readjustment. A new mobilization was attempted, but, due to reprisals by the company, it did not happen.

After the Scania workers' strike, other factory mobilizations occurred. Several forms of mobilization were registered, from total and prolonged to sectorial and partial stoppages, as well as lightning strikes of very short duration. At Ford, in São Bernardo, the movement began on May 15, started by the machining and tooling workers, and later reached from the engine manufacturing sector to the painting section, paralyzing the entire production for a week. Fifteen days before the Scania strike, a Ford workers' commission had demanded the maintenance of the 39% readjustment, granted in April, without the discounts of the anticipations. As they did not receive a favorable answer from the company's management, they stopped the work, demanding a 20% salary increase, an improvement in the food and medical system, and a reduction in the transportation costs. A week after the beginning of the strike, the company offered the possibility of a 15% raise for those earning up to ten minimum wages and a 10% raise for those earning more than ten minimum wages. Eventually, it was granted an 11% increase. At Volkswagen, there was a partial strike, which began on May 16 by the tool shop workers and lasted three days, affecting the body shop, tool sharpening, and light presses. The company reacted by firing 28 workers. Volkswagen's acceptance of the index that was agreed upon between the automotive industry as a whole and the union, as well as the non-accomplishment of the layoffs, became the flags of the movement, which were accepted by the company.

The Minister of Finance, Mário Henrique Simonsen, stated that the movement was illegal, and the governor of São Paulo, Paulo Egydio Martins, went to the press to emphasize that he was following the strikes of the metalworkers with concern. The Jornal do Brasil received an order from the Federal Censorship not to publish news about the strikes. On March 18, the Regional Labor Court (Tribunal Regional do Trabalho - TRT) decided for the illegality of the strikes, however, the strike movement still reached a significant number of metallurgical industries in the ABC Paulista, among them Mercedes, Chrysler, Villares, Brastemp, Pirelli, Cofap, Philips, Otis, General Electric, among other large, medium and small companies, also finding repercussions in São Paulo, reaching Toshiba, Hyster, Orniex, Brasprensas, among others. In anticipation of imminent strikes, some companies informed their workers that they would follow whatever was established in the agreement between workers and employers in the automotive industry, which was signed on May 30 of that year. Negotiated between the São Bernardo Metalworkers union and the National Association of Motor Vehicle Manufacturers (Associação Nacional dos Fabricantes de Veículos Automotores - ANFAVEA), this agreement covered about 65 thousand workers and contemplated the following adjustment indexes: 11% increase, granted in June (5.5%) and October (5.5%) besides a wage anticipation of 13.5%, granted in August (4.5%), December (4.5%) and February (4.5%). The agreement also made it possible for the workers from small and medium-sized companies in the auto parts industry to strike during the second semester of 1978, in order to obtain the same concessions valid for the auto industry. One month after the beginning of the movement in the ABC region, almost two hundred thousand workers obtained wage increases. Although no company met the 34% demanded, all the increases achieved were neither compensated in future collective bargaining agreements nor passed on to product prices.

=== Metalworkers' general strike of 1979 ===
After the collective agreement between the employers and the workers of the metallurgical industry of the ABC region was reached, there was, during the second semester of 1978, a series of agitations in several companies, especially in São Bernardo, aiming at the generalization of that agreement to the metallurgical category as a whole. In parallel, the employers began a series of layoffs and, foreseeing the outbreak of a new confrontation in the auto industry at the time of the 1979 wage campaign, they intensified their preventive action, with the elaboration of a circular by FIESP, containing instructions for the confrontation of strikes. In this document, it was suggested that the companies should not pay for the hours stopped, and in case of a strike, they should prevent the workers from remaining inside the factories. Still at the end of 1978, within this framework of animosity between the employers and the metalworkers, strikes broke out at Villares and Resil. At Villares the movement was triggered in early December, in solidarity with a worker who had been fired after being assaulted by the head of the milling section. With the strike, the company's management began a process of mass dismissals, even affecting the existing workers' committee. After a few days of strike action, with the intensification of reprisals and the increase of layoffs, they returned to work. The strike at Resil, however, had a different outcome. Demanding a 30% wage increase, the workers, faced with the bosses' refusal, stopped work. The company, following FIESP's suggestion, laid off workers and prevented the strikers from remaining inside the plant, and the workers began to meet at the union. On the eighth day of the strike, the workers, fearing that the movement would be undermined, since the company was hiring workers to replace the strikers, picketed in front of the plant's gate. Resil eventually gave in to the movement, calling Lula to negotiate, and granted a 15% raise for the one to three minimum wage range, 11% for the three to six minimum wage range, and 7% for the six to ten minimum wage range, in addition to an increase in the wage floor and premium at the beginning of the year.

Still in 1978, in October, the III São Bernardo Metalworkers Congress, in which was discussed, fundamentally, the Brazilian trade-union structure and strategies to be adopted by the trade-union movement. In accordance with the resolutions of this congress, the union started to make workers meetings by companies, aiming to supply the absence of the union inside the factories. In late January, the metalworkers unions in the state established their basic demands: 34.1% wage increase above the official index (to replace wage losses); wage floor equal to three minimum wages; validity of the Collective Labor Convention from April to October 1979, so that it could coincide with the base date of the metalworkers in the capital, Osasco and Guarulhos; recognition and stability for union delegates (one for each group of five hundred workers); reduction of the working day to forty hours per week and quarterly readjustments.

As the valid base date for the metallurgical workers in the ABC region approached, the businessmen became more cautious, fearing a new strike outbreak. A confidential circular from the Machinery Industry Union of the State of São Paulo (Sindicato da Indústria de Máquinas do Estado de São Paulo - SIMESP) proposed that any direct negotiations or agreements with the workers should be avoided and that negotiations should be carried out by the entity representing the economic category to which the industry belonged. Another circular suggested increasing the stock of the companies, increasing the bosses' control over the workers and resorting to the "police garrison to remain on standby" in case of "imminent danger". The São Bernardo Metalworkers Union responded by advising the workers not to work overtime, thus avoiding an increase in production, and to be careful with the bosses, foremen and supervisors. The ABC metalworkers had already been holding assemblies, preparing for a situation that was heading towards confrontation, while the Metalworkers Federation tried to obtain the powers of attorney from the unions, which authorized it to make an agreement valid for the whole category. The disagreement in signing this document was the episode that led to the definite separation of the São Bernardo Metalworkers Union from the São Paulo Metalworkers Federation, considered conciliator and "skinner" by the unionists of the ABC. The Metalworkers Federation accepted FIESP's proposal, validating it for 29 unions of the interior; the unions of the ABC, Santa Bárbara D'Oeste and Santos did not sign the agreement. The agreement in question established the rates of 63% for those earning one to three minimum wages, 57% from three to ten minimum wages and 44% for those earning more than ten minimum wages. Even if these rates were considered reasonable by the unions from the countryside, they were not for the ABC, because they were applied over wages from April 1978, disregarding therefore the 11% obtained in the strikes of May of the interior year, as well as the anticipations from the second semester of that year. Moreover, at least 60% of the ABC metalworkers were paid more than three minimum wages.

On March 13, on the eve of the inauguration of General João Figueiredo as President of the Republic, and after an assembly rejecting the employers' proposal, the ABC metalworkers went on strike. Differently from the mobilizations of the previous year, this time the strike was general. A wage commission was created, which had an important role, together with the union leadership, in the preparation and organization of the strike. In the early hours of March 13, several factories in the ABC region, such as Ford and Volkswagen, stopped their activities. On that same day an expressive assembly was held in São Bernardo, with around sixty thousand workers, initiating a practice of plebiscite assemblies, where the directions of the movement were constantly evaluated and redefined. Besides Ford and Volkswagen, workers from Mercedes-Benz, Brastemp, Villares, Schuler, Vulcanus, Buffalo Motors, Saab-Scania, Chrysler, Cima, Cofap, Otis, General Electric, among other small, medium and large companies, also joined the strike on the first day. The movement also found repercussions in the interior of the state, with strikes in São José dos Campos, Caçapava, Jacareí, Jundiaí, Campinas and Santa Bárbara d'Oeste.

On March 15, the strike was judged illegal by the TRT, which also rejected the creation of a shop steward, one of the main demands of the movement. Nevertheless, on the fourth day of the strike, there were about 170,000 workers paralyzed in ABC and an assembly was held in the Vila Euclides Stadium, in which the continuity of the strike was reaffirmed and the creation of a strike fund was announced by Djalma Bom. The Ministry of Labor, in turn, ordered the investigation of incitement and infiltration accusations in the strikes, while the bosses carried out several reprisals against the strikers, denying the concession of vouchers to workers, threatening dismissals and hiring replacements. After the creation of the strike fund, a national campaign of solidarity with the strikers was initiated, through the collection of financial resources and food for the paralyzed workers, which had the strong support of the Church.

On the tenth day of the strike, the Ministry of Labor proposed a protocol of intentions that established the creation of a tripartite commission to study, within 45 days, the index of readjustment, the prohibition of dismissal to strikers and the payment of the stopped hours to be later discounted in installments. The protocol would be taken to the workers and their approval would result in an immediate return to work. In an assembly held the same day, 80 thousand workers gathered in the Vila Euclides Stadium rejected the proposal. The government then decreed intervention in the union and prohibited demonstrations and assemblies in the Vila Euclides Stadium. A public act against the intervention in São Bernardo and Diadema Metalworkers Union was held, with the participation of several entities of civil society in the Municipal Chamber of São Paulo. In Santo André about thirty thousand workers repudiated the protocol and unanimously decided to continue the strike; six thousand workers did the same in São Caetano do Sul.

The intervention in the union intensified the conflict, and the days that followed were marked by threats of open conflagrations between the workers and the repressive apparatus. On the afternoon that followed the intervention, around 25 thousand workers, in front of the Municipal Square, held a demonstration and entered in direct confrontation with the police. The mother Church became the center of meetings of the union's leaders and the wages commission after the intervention, showing the support of the Church - especially the Operária Pastoral, directed by Cláudio Hummes - to the ABC Paulista workers movement. The following assembly, held in the Municipal Square, was an acute moment in the course of the strike. Lula was absent and the workers, disoriented, were clamoring for his presence and for the continuity of the strike. Djalma Bom, who was in charge of taking the slogan to the assembly, noticed the disorientation of the workers and was unable to formulate his proposals clearly. On March 26, Lula and the Union's leadership reassumed the leadership of the movement, reaffirming the need to maintain the organization of the strike, the action of picket lines and the non-entry of workers into the factories. The strike movement, however, went into ebb, as despite the continuity of the strike, there was a considerable return to work, which caused the union leadership and the wage commission to reevaluate the movement and visualize the impossibility of its continuation. In the general assembly held on March 27, after a new evaluation by the strike command, a provisional agreement was reached with the employers, which Lula and the command took for approval in this new assembly: the workers would give a 45-day truce, a period in which, through new negotiations with the employers, an attempt would be made to obtain a more satisfactory wage index than the one reached by the metalworkers in the countryside; otherwise, the ABC metalworkers would go on strike again.

The union continued mobilizing the workers during the 45 days of truce, preparing for a new conflict. The employers' breach of the agreement, with layoffs and discounts in the wages of the striking workers, ended up triggering new strikes. On May 1, a public act was held on International Workers' Day, with the presence of more than 130,000 workers. With the imminence of a new general strike, the employers reassessed the direction they had been taking in the negotiations. Lula and the directors of the trade union reaffirmed the importance of resuming the strike, if a new agreement was not reached. On May 12 the agreement between FIESP and the ABC metalworkers was signed, approved in a plebiscite assembly on May 13. The agreement provided for a 63% raise for those earning up to ten minimum wages, to be applied over the March 1978 salary (above ten minimum wages, the index would be equal to the official 44%), and would be valid for companies that granted the average 11% extradisside readjustment in the previous year. For the other indexes, the same from the agreement would be applied as in the agreement made for the countryside unions. There would also be a discount of 50% of the paralyzed days, in five equal and successive installments starting June 10, while the other half would be settled directly between the workers and the companies, not being computed for vacation, 13th salary and paid weekly rest periods. Despite the agreement being more advantageous than the one signed by the Federation, the workers considered it unsatisfactory. Its approval by the assembly was due to the difficulty of obtaining something more favorable and the priority given towards the recovery of the Union, still under intervention. On May 18, the Union was returned to the workers.

=== Metalworkers' general strike of 1980 ===
In November 1979, the military government established a new wage policy, which introduced the semi-annual salary adjustment; created the National Consumer Price Index (Índice Nacional de Preços ao Consumidor - INPC) system, fixed by the government; and established differentiated wage ranges: 1.1 of the INPC for those who earned up to three minimum wages, 1.0 for those who earned three to ten minimum wages, 0.8 for those who earned between ten and twenty minimum wages, and 0.5 for those who earned more than twenty minimum wages. The new wage policy also established a single possibility of direct negotiation between workers and employers, where a quantum, exceeding the INPC, could be established as productivity. Among workers, such measure caused the perception that the new wage policy removed the right of direct negotiation with employers. The intensification of the economic recession, directly affecting workers, further consolidated an unfavorable scenario, because in addition to wage depression, unemployment increased.

After the implementation of this new wage policy, the workers in the automotive industry intensified their wage campaign in the beginning of 1980. Anticipating a new and fierce confrontation with the employers, the ABC metalworkers tried to give more organicity to their action. The first assembly was held in three sessions, during February 29 and March 1, with the participation of around 4,500 workers. A mobilization command was organized with 466 workers, which would have the responsibility of preparing and organizing the following assemblies. In the second assembly, on March 16, the workers decided that during the negotiations no overtime hours would be worked and the production pace in the factories would be slowed down. There were 215 meetings by factories in the Union and 65 assemblies at the entrances and exits of the shifts, totaling almost three hundred preparatory assemblies for the demands list. Again, the ABC union leaderships opted for a campaign independent from the Metalworkers' Federation. The agenda presented to FIESP by the ABC metalworkers demanded a readjustment based on the INPC plus 15% as productivity; wage floor of Cr$ 12 thousand; job stability; reduction of the working day to forty hours, without wage reduction; recognition of the shop stewards; union presence in the factories and control of the bosses by the workers. Among the demands presented, the adoption of the wage floor and the recognition of the shop stewards were the ones that gained most attention in the campaign.

Negotiations began on March 18. Instead of the 15% above the INPC, requested by the workers, FIESP offered 3.65%, which was raised to 5% three days before the strike began. The workers' demands concerning the wage floor - FIESP offered a floor of Cr$5,904, less than half the amount demanded - the stability, the reduction of the workday, the shop stewards and the management control were rejected. Before the strike, the workers still tried to reach an agreement, in a meeting at the Regional Labor Office (Delegacia Regional do Trabalho - DRT), which provided for a 7% productivity increase for up to three minimum wages, 6.5% for three to ten minimum wages and 4% for more than ten minimum wages, as well as twelve-month stability, also rejected by FIESP.

On March 30, in an assembly, the workers in the ABC region decided to paralyze their activities starting April 1. In São Bernardo, the assembly included sixty thousand workers; in Santo André, around forty thousand and in São Caetano, on the following day, two thousand workers made the decision. Besides the ABC region, the strike reached, during the first days, Sertãozinho, Taubaté, Pindamonhangaba, Guaratinguetá, Piracicaba, São José dos Campos, Sorocaba, Campinas, Santa Bárbara d'Oeste, Araraquara, Américo Brasiliense, Ribeirão Preto, Ourinhos, Mococa, Jundiaí, Lorena and Cruzeiro, combining partial strikes by factory and general strikes. In São Bernardo, the adhesion reached 90% of the category, and in the early morning of April 1, three assemblies were held at the union.

Still on the first day of the strike, the TRT decided not to examine the legality of the strike, declaring itself incompetent to do so, and elaborated an alternative proposal, which contemplated indexes of 7% for those earning up to three minimum wages and 6% for the rest of the wage brackets, stipulating the wage floor at Cr$5,100.00, and refusing to pay for stability, union delegate and reduction of the workday. The TRT's judgment made the metalworkers in some cities in the interior accept its terms, ending the strike, but those in the ABC region, even though they recognized a certain victory in relation to the productivity index and the fact that it was not illegal, did not accept the terms established, dissatisfied mainly with the lowering of the wage floor, and went on strike, still with 90% adherence. Foreseeing the longevity of the strike, they began, with the support of the Church, to collect food, as well as financial resources for the support of the strikers through a strike fund. They also structured an organization capable of continuing the movement in case of intervention or absence of the management, with the articulation of a strike command, with sixteen workers, who would replace, one by one, if necessary, the members of the management. To speed up the decisions of this command, there was an intermediary rank, with about 45 workers, who were in charge of transmitting the directives to the wages and mobilization commission, with 446 members. These, distributed throughout the factories and neighborhoods, liaised between the grassroot and the command.

On April 10, the metalworkers in São Caetano ended the strike, after a considerable return to work on the eighth day of the strike. In São Bernardo and Santo André, however, the workers remained paralyzed. It is estimated that of the 287,000 metalworkers in the ABC and the interior of São Paulo, 170,000 workers were still on strike, of which 127,000 were from São Bernardo and Diadema, representing 90% of the category in the region. In Santo André, 43,000 workers remained paralyzed, representing 70% of the category in the municipality.

On April 11, the Termomecânica company gave in to negotiation, proposing an agreement that stipulated a wage floor of Cr$12,000, a real increase of 12% for the range up to five minimum wages, 8.5% for the range from five to eight minimum wages, 6% for those earning above eight minimum wages; in addition to payment for the days on strike, no punishment for strikers, establishment of a maximum of three salary ranges for each function, and wage anticipation of 3% a month, cumulatively. However, negotiations were interrupted when, on April 15, in a second trial, the TRT decides for the illegality of the strike.

Once the strike movement was declared illegal, there was legal backing for the repressive actions that followed. As soon as the metalworkers got to know about this new decision, the board of the São Bernardo union wrote a document repudiating the TRT's action and reaffirming the continuity of the strike. On April 17, the military government intervened in the São Bernardo do Campo and Santo André unions and dismissed their leaderships. The then Minister of Labor, Murilo Macedo, who had already intervened in other unions, also had the strike leaders and other personalities representing liberal associations arrested, among them Lula, Djalma Bom and Devanir Ribeiro from São Bernardo; José Cicote, Ernesto Sencini, Isaías V. da Cunha, Orlando Francelino Mota and José Timóteo da Silva, from Sando André; José Ferreira da Silva, union militant from São Caetano; Arnaldo Gonçalves, president of the Santos metalworkers union; Afonso Deléllis, former metalworkers union militant from São Paulo; José Carlos Dias, from the Justice and Peace Commission; Dalmo Dallari, jurist; Ricardo Zarattini, amnesty; and Antonio Roberto Espinosa, journalist and former guerrilla.

Soon after receiving the news of the intervention, Expedito Soares instructed the workers to go to the City Hall; if it was closed, they would go to the mother Church and, if that was not possible, they would use the other churches in the ABC and São Paulo. Entering the third week of the strike, the metalworkers tried to keep the momentum of the movement. By now they had added to their previous demands the demand for the release of prisoners and an end to the intervention in the trade unions. The government was getting tougher, restricting the possible meeting spaces, among which only the churches were left. The businessmen, in turn, reinforced the reprisals. The conflicts between police and workers intensified and a movement of sparse return to work could already be perceived.

Unable to hold assemblies in the Vila Euclides and Vila Jaçatuba Stadiums or in the Paço Municipal, the workers began to hold them in the mother Church and to maintain mobilization through neighborhood meetings. The possibility of having a shelter for the unions in the community associations was facilitated by the relatively large number of community groups found in the ABC region. At the time of the 1980 strike, in São Bernardo do Campo alone there were about forty Friends of Neighborhood Societies (Sociedades Amigos de Bairro - SABs). In addition, the city had sixty parishes, each responsible for several Basic Ecclesial Communities. The community and regional meetings allowed the substitute strike leaders to make a more accurate assessment of the strikers' willingness to continue the strike. As a result, the links with the associations provided the beleaguered militants with a reliable connection to the bases to obtain information regarding the level of commitment and material needs of the strikers.

As the thirtieth day of the strike approached, the employers intensified their reprisals against the strike movement, stating that those who would not return to work would be fired under the allegation of abandoning their jobs. The movement ebbed, with a considerable return to work and an ever decreasing number of workers present at the assemblies. Even so, on May 1, in a demonstration that gathered more than one hundred thousand metalworkers, the employees retook the Vila Euclides Stadium, giving new impetus to the movement. After the impact of May 1, new demonstrations of significant return to work began to appear. In early May, the metalworkers in Santo André decided to return to work and ended their participation in the movement. According to the strike command, the strike had reached less than 55% of the total number of metalworkers in the municipality, which is why, on May 5, around five hundred workers from Sando André gathered in an assembly at the Bonfim Church decided to end the strike. On that same day, in São Bernardo, there was a fierce confrontation between metalworkers and police troops, which lasted several hours, after the assembly held in the morning, in the mother Church, decided once more to continue the strike. A commission composed of union members Jacó Bittar and João Paulo Pires de Vasconcelos and Bishop Cláudio Hummes went to Brasília to contact the authorities for this purpose.

Already showing signs of wearing out, the ABC metalworkers ended their strike movement on May 12, after 41 days of paralysis. The union leaders remained in prison for a few more days, when an appeal presented by the lawyer from the Brazilian Amnesty Committee (Comitê Brasileiro pela Anistia - CBA) managed to get the preventive detention relaxed. The union members were eventually prosecuted under the National Security Law, in a trial by a military court that took place in early 1981. By May 22, 1980, ten days after the strike ended, the companies had already made about four thousand layoffs.

The pressure on this strike and its adverse outcome for workers had a major impact on the national trade union movement in the early 1980s. The massive employment of military police against the strikers, the arrest of their leaders on charges of undermining the National Security Law, and the occupation of union headquarters resulted in a decline in strikes during the latter part of the year. The level of repression and intensity of conflict between workers and employers, as well as the economic recession, resulted in a 62% reduction in the number of strikes in 1980.

== Consequences ==
After the 1978 strike, other labor mobilizations became possible, in a process that was consolidated and expanded with the strikes of metalworkers in 1979 and 1980, to which other categories such as bank workers, oil workers and teachers were incorporated around the country, marking the rise of the labor movement after years of inertia. In 1979, there was an expansion of strikes through the cities of the interior of São Paulo, in Minas Gerais and Rio Grande do Sul. The new strikes that emerged in other parts of the country were often called by the grassroots, in absentia of the union leaderships.

The strike movement of 1978–1980 also marks the emergence of a new unionism, characterized by the type of organization that developed among grassroots workers, juxtaposing the ties of the specific category union with the network of worker community organizations. The nature of demands also came to express a greater sense of class self-determination in relations with employers and the state, particularly in the case of agendas such as demands for shop stewards, factory committees, union freedom and autonomy, and direct negotiation between employees and employers.

The new generation of union leaders also assumed a more militant position among the opposition groups to the military regime, along with the student movement, advocating an immediate return to democracy, while other factions of the opposition advocated a gradual re-democratization. The emergence of the new trade unionism introduced, into the realm of political opposition working-class, demands to be achieved through liberalization of institutions, and culminated in the 1980s in the formation of the Workers' Party (PT) and inter-union umbrella bodies such as the Unified Workers' Central (CUT) and the General Confederation of Workers (CGT).

== See also ==
- Luiz Inácio Lula da Silva
- Workers' Party (Brazil) (PT)
- General Confederation of Workers (CGT)
- Unified Workers' Central (CUT)
- Federation of Industries of the State of São Paulo (FIESP)
- Military dictatorship in Brazil
- Diretas Já
- Basic ecclesial community
- ABC Metalworkers' Union

== Bibliography ==
- Antunes, Ricardo (1988). A rebeldia do trabalho. O confronto operário no ABC Paulista: as greves de 1978/1980. São Paulo: UNICAMP.
- Prado, Luiz Carlos Delorme; Earp, Fábio Sá (2007). "O 'milagre' brasileiro: crescimento acelerado, integração internacional e concentração de renda (1967–1973)". In: Ferreira, Jorge; Delgado, Lucilia de Almeida Neves. O Brasil Republicano: O tempo do regime autoritário - vol. 4: Ditadura militar e redemocratização - Quarta República (1964–1985). (in Portuguese) Vol. 4. Rio de Janeiro: Civilização Brasileira, 2003.
- Rodrigues, Leôncio Martins (1991). "As tendências políticas na formação das centrais sindicais". In: Boito Jr., Armando. O sindicalismo brasileiro nos anos 80. (in Portuguese) Rio de Janeiro: Paz e Terra, 1991.
- Sandoval, Salvador AM. Os trabalhadores param: greves e mudança social no Brasil, 1945–1990. (in Portuguese) Vol. 32. São Paulo: Atica, 1994.
- Santana, Marco Aurélio (2007). "Trabalhadores em movimento: o sindicalismo brasileiro nos anos 1980–1990". In: Ferreira, Jorge; Delgado, Lucilia de Almeida Neves. O Brasil Republicano: O tempo do regime autoritário - vol. 4: Ditadura militar e redemocratização - Quarta República (1964–1985). (in Portuguese) Vol. 4. Rio de Janeiro: Civilização Brasileira, 2003.
- Silva, Francisco Carlos Teixeira (2007). "Crise da ditadura militar e o processo de abertura política no Brasil, 1974–1985" .In: Ferreira, Jorge; Delgado, Lucilia de Almeida Neves. O Brasil Republicano: O tempo do regime autoritário - vol. 4: Ditadura militar e redemocratização - Quarta República (1964–1985). (in Portuguese) Vol. 4. Rio de Janeiro: Civilização Brasileira, 2003.
