= Andritz =

Andritz may refer to:

- Andritz (Graz), district in Graz, Austria
- Andritz AG, Austrian company
