= Kea Aerospace =

New Zealand aerospace company

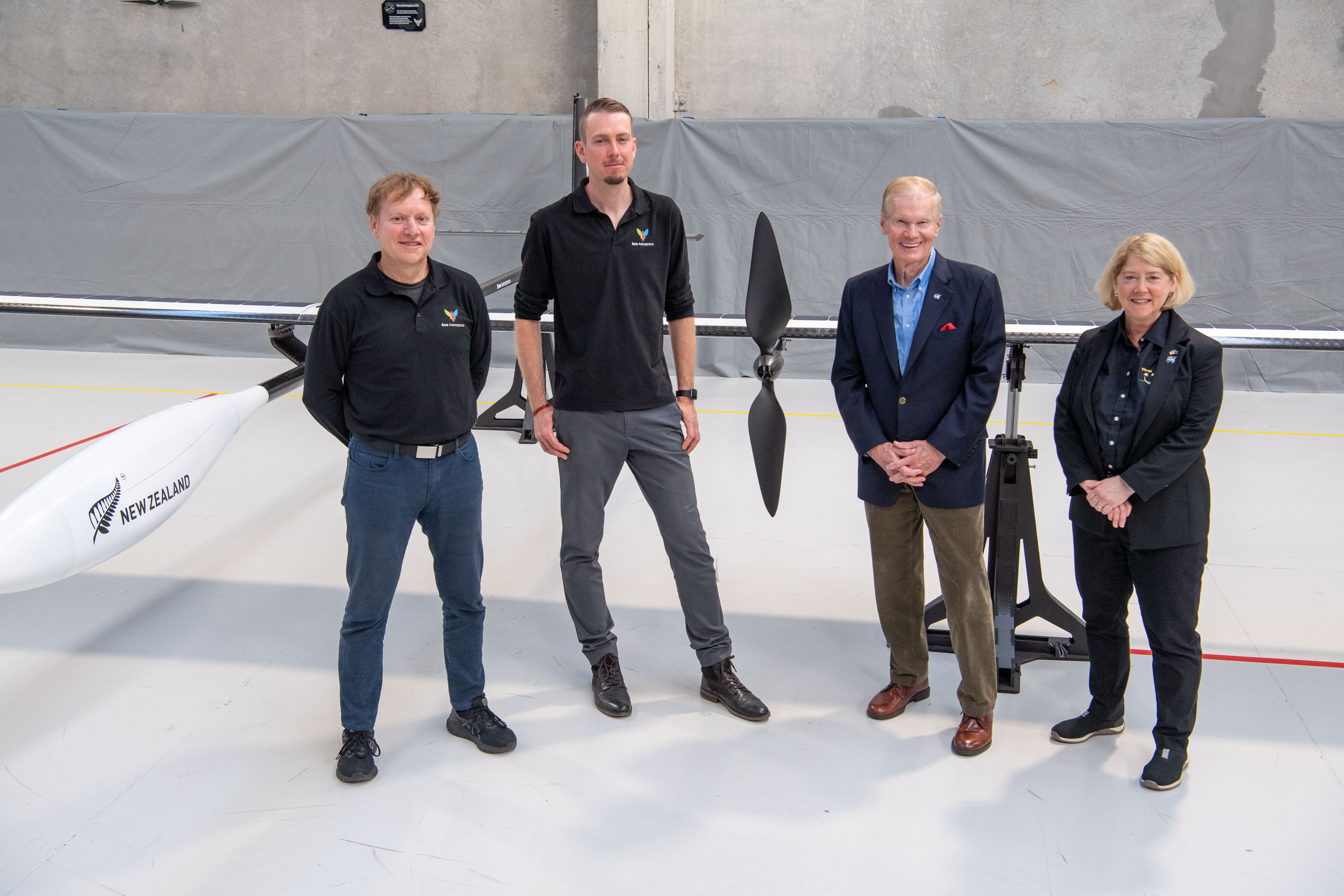
- From left: founders Mark Rocket and Philipp Sültrop with NASA Administrator Bill Nelson and Deputy Administrator Pamela Melroy
- Founded: 2018
- Founder: Mark Rocket; Philipp Sültrop
- Headquarters: Christchurch, New Zealand
- Website: keaaerospace.com

Kea Aerospace is a New Zealand company that is developing solar-powered aerial imaging aircraft that fly in the stratosphere. The company is based in Christchurch.

== History ==
The Christchurch-based company was founded in 2018 by Mark Rocket, a seed investor of Rocket Lab, as well as Philipp Sültrop. Rocket is the CEO of Kea, and Wolfgang Leitner provided early funding.

Kea Aerospace became the second company in New Zealand to participate in the government's Airspace Integration Trials Programme. Kea is collaborating with the NASA Ames Research Center on the image processing algorithms. In an October 2022 high-altitude balloon flight to take measurements and test their equipment, the company brought a kea soft toy, named Kelly the Kea, into the stratosphere. It landed in a farm using a parachute.

In February 2025 the Kea Atmos made its first flight into the stratosphere, flying to an altitude of 17,155 metres (56,284 ft), with a flight duration of 8 hours and 20 minutes where it flew a total distance of 420 kilometres (260 mi). It has a wingspan of 12.5 metres and a weight under 40 kilograms (88 lb). It is solar powered, and transmits the data it is receiving to the ground. The aircraft, which has been described as a "cross between a satellite and a plane", is solar-powered. The company aims at having flights that last for months at a time, and says that the aircraft may be used for "things like maritime surveillance, environmental monitoring [and] disaster management". As of 2025, the company launches the aircraft using a driving car. This is because the aircraft must be very light, meaning it cannot afford to use a landing gear.

In 2026 Kea Aerospace opened a new facility in Christchurch, made to aid the development of the Atmos Mk2. Kea Aerospace aims to get the Mk2 to fly in the stratosphere for weeks to months at a time. The Mk2 is planned to have a wingspan of 35 metres (115 ft). In August 2026 the company stated that it was planning to launch the aircraft in three years.

== See also ==
- Dawn Aerospace
