= Joseph Körösi =

Hungarian-born Austrian industrialist (1811–1868)

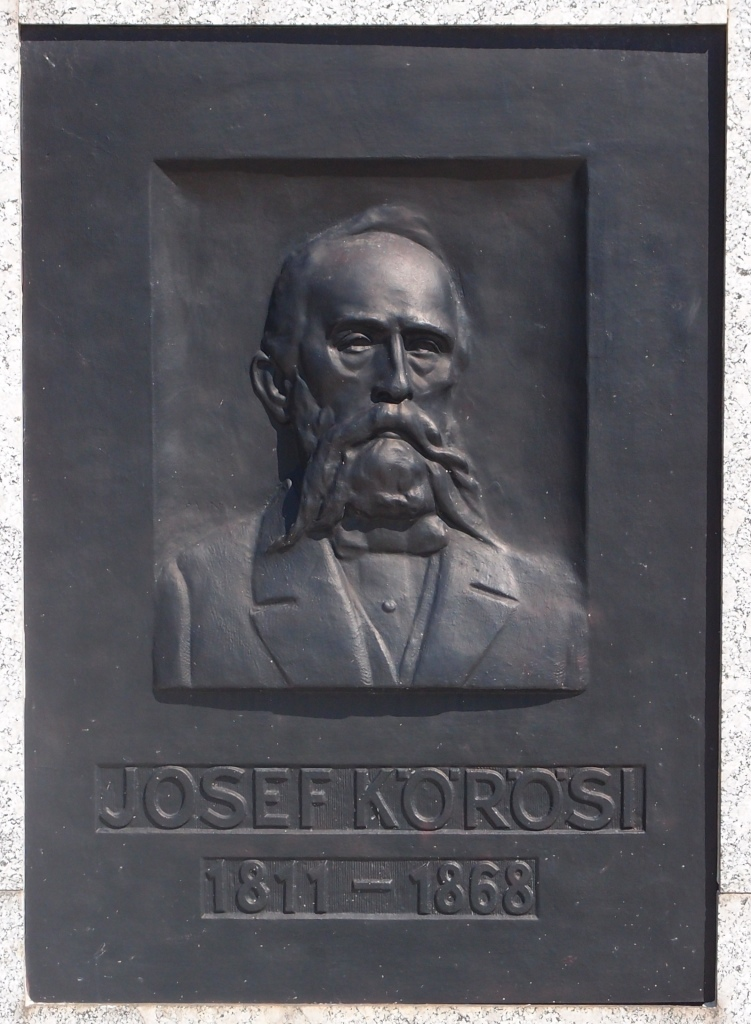
- Relief portrait of Josef Körösi at his tomb in Graz
- Born: 16 June 1811; Szeged
- Died: 31 January 1868 (aged 56); Graz
- Other names: Josef Körösi
- Occupation: industrialist

Joseph Körösi (16 June 1811 in Szeged – 31 January 1868 in Graz) was an Austrian Empire industrialist and the founder of today's Andritz AG.

== Biography ==
After a three year's apprenticeship in iron retail in Szeged and years of travel which also led him to Pest in 1829, Körösi started to work in warehousing in Graz in 1831. Together with a partner he bought a factory specialised on chains in 1836 which he transformed from manual to machine production. In 1841 he became the sole owner of that factory which was located in the city of Graz. Körösi expanded the product range by machines and metal goods from 1848 onwards. In 1852 he had a new production plant built which comprised a joined hardware store. That plant called Andritzer Maschinenfabrik was located in Andritz which is today a district of Graz. Starting with forged goods and small machines, Körösi's business later included iron foundry as well as bridge and boiler construction. In 1854 Körösi employed a staff of 100 rising to 600 labourers only ten years later. He thus became one of Austria's most important machine manufacturers of that time.

Körösi established comprehensive social benefits for his employees including the building of residential homes for them, the support of school activities for their children as well as funds and schemes for health care, invalidity and pension. There were also welfare benefits for widows and orphans. Some of those funds existed well after his death. Josef Körösi was married to Katharina née Wirth (born 1817). They had an adopted son called Viktor who was born in 1848. After Josef Körösi's death caused by a respiratory failure, his adopted son Viktor Körösi took over his father's business.

In Graz, a secondary school and a street are named after Josef Körösi.
