= Andritz AG =

Austrian company

- Type: Aktiengesellschaft
- Traded as: WBAG: ANDR
- ISIN: AT0000730007
- Industry: Industrial processing
- Founded: 1852; 174 years ago
- Headquarters: Graz, Austria
- Number of locations: 280
- Key people: Joachim Schönbeck (CEO)
- Products: Turnkey equipment for hydropower plants, the production of pulp and paper and feed and biofuels; plants for steel production; industrial separation technologies
- Revenue: EUR 7.543 billion (annual report 2022)
- Number of employees: 29,100 (2023)
- Divisions: Pulp and paper, hydro power, metals, separation, feed and biofuel
- Website: www.andritz.com

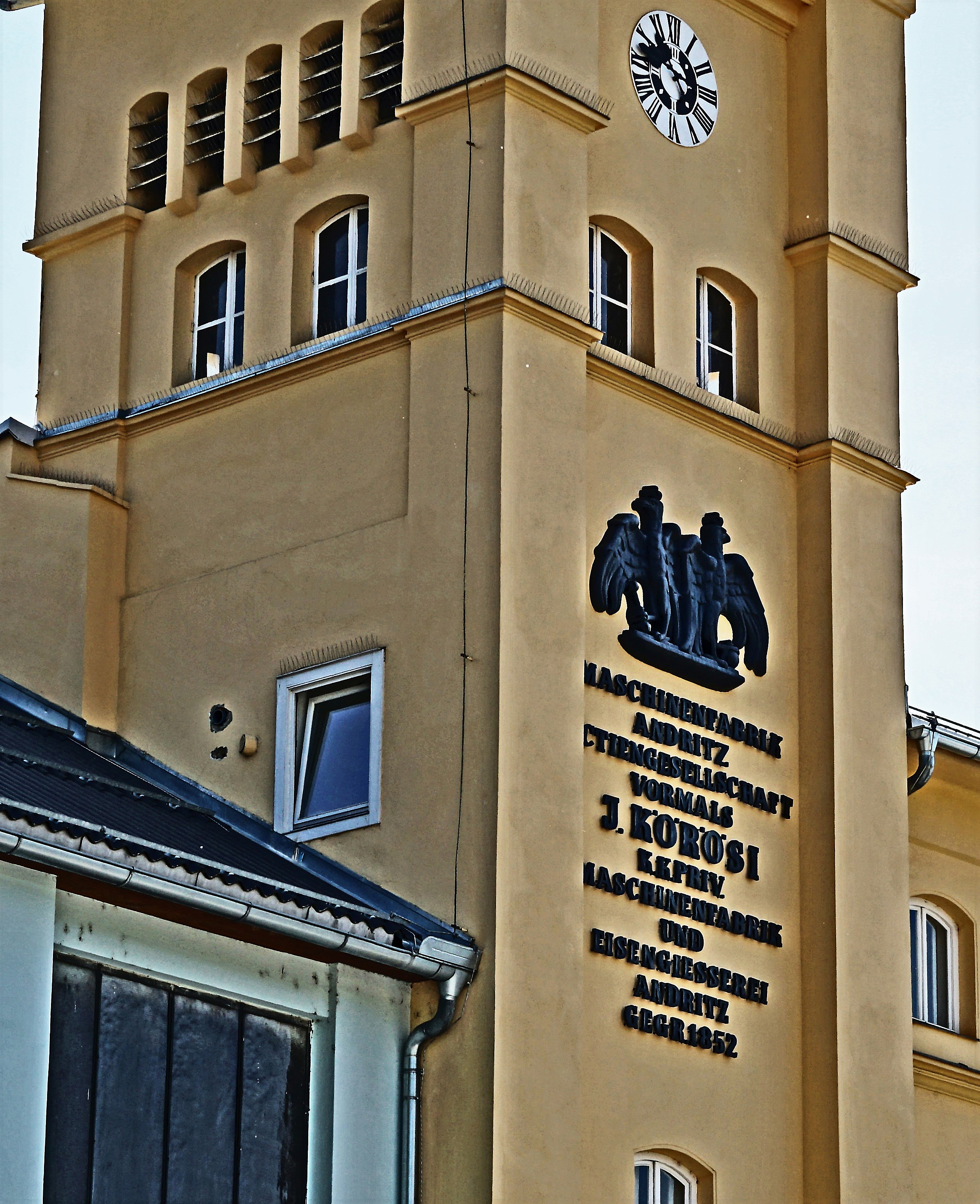
Andritz AG, Graz

Andritz AG is an international technology group, offering plants, equipment, systems and services for various industries. The group's headquarters are in Graz, Austria. The group gets its name from the district of Andritz in which it is located and is listed on the Vienna Stock Exchange.

Andritz employs more than 29,100 employees at over 280 production and service facilities in over 40 countries. In 2022, the company reported a revenue of EUR€7.5 billion, and a net income of €402.6 million.

== Business areas ==
As of January 2024 Andritz consists of four main business areas:

- Hydro Power
- Pulp and Paper
- Metals
- Environment & Energy

== Andritz Metals ==
The business area Andritz Metals (former "Rolling Mills and Strip Processing") is the third-largest business unit. Andritz Metals designs, develops and erects complete lines for the production and further processing of cold-rolled carbon steel, stainless steel and non-ferrous metal strips, including furnaces, presses and acid regeneration equipment.

== Andritz Metals USA Inc. ==
Headquartered in Callery, PA, USA, Andritz Metals USA Inc. has four subsidiaries:

- Andritz Asko
  - Manufacturer of slitter knives, slitter tooling, shearing knives and accessories for the ferrous and non-ferrous metal producing industries
- Andritz Bricmont
  - Manufacturer of furnace technologies for the aluminum and steel industries, including galvanizing systems
- Andritz Herr-Voss Stamco
  - Manufacturer of coil processing equipment

== History ==
=== The beginnings ===
In 1852, Joseph Körösi, an ironmonger from Hungary, founded a small iron foundry in the then still independent municipality of Andritz. Working in conjunction with a neighbouring earlier facility also owned by Körösim, the company's product range expanded very quickly. Specifically, by the late 1850s, the foundry was producing steam hammers and entire iron bridges. By 1860, the works was employing in excess of 500 people, which rose to 1,300 employees by 1870. Furthermore, by this point, the works had expanded into producing steam boilers, steam engines, and mining machinery were also manufactured.

=== Late 19th century ===
After the death of the company founder in 1871, his adopted son Viktor Körösi (1848-1912) became the owner of the machine factory (city office 1874: Griesgasse 36), of which he had been the director until then. As a result of a general economic crisis in Austria (triggered, among other things, by the loss of the Austrian territories in Upper Italy), as well as management persisting with an increasingly impractical growth strategy where labour costs persistently escalated while orders stagnated, the company quickly encountered a period of hardship. In 1873, over 1,000 workers had to be made redundant. During the early 1880s, in response to the company having become heavily indebted, Viktor Körösi transferred ownership to its primary creditor, Österreichische Alpine Montanunion (ÖMAG), an association of iron and steel industry companies in Styria and forerunner of Voestalpine. Thereafter, the company was reorganised, shutting down unprofitable activities and centralising iron production to locations that were well served by Austria's railway network.

Andritz's role within ÖMAG was to produce modern technical apparatus, particularly large machines, that would be adopted across the parent company's various industrial locations. Accordingly, the company produced rolling mills and large steam engines, many of which were delivered to ÖMAG's mines. During its first decade of ÖMAG ownership, the firm produced roughly 200 steam engines, a field in which the company became particularly innovative, such as the development of new control systems. Towards the end of the 19th century, Andritzis became a key supplier for the Austrian Navy, providing high powered steam engines that were used for shipbuilding. Furthermore, it is claimed that the company produced the heaviest and most powerful metallurgical apparatus in the nation during the late 19th century.

=== Early 20th century ===
On 30 March 1900, the Austrian industrialist Max von Gutmann acquired the company and transformed it into the stock corporation Maschinenfabrik Andritz Actiengesellschaft. This reorganisation was politically charged, the Austrian government having ran an inquiry into the company's business practices only two years earlier into its effective cartel of the nation's iron production. Integrated into the Gutmann group, the business is realigned to more active in both sales and marketing. During the 1900s, a large proportion of the company's work came from the construction of new domestic railways; the large government contracts for the railways bolstered the reorganised company's profile.

In 1906, Andritz established two new departments, one dedicated to crane construction and the other specialising in high-pressure centrifugal pumps, which were largely intended for use in waterworks and mines. Between 1906 and 1914, the firm produced roughly 1,000 centrifugal pumps; virtually all large coal mines in Austria adopted these pumps. The firm also retained good business relations with its former owner ÖMAG, being a supplier to its works along with nearly every large industrial company in Austria-Hungary.

The outbreak of the First World War in 1914 was disruptive to Andritz; its existing orders were abruptly cancelled and a large portion of its workforces were made redundant. The company was assigned a military manager that reprioritised production to cater to military requirements, such as bullet presses, grenade shells, and ammunition wagons. In 1916, wartime demands led to the output of iron ore doubling, although a shortage of labour was hampering production by the start of 1917 as many of Andritz's specialist employees had enlisted in military service. In the final months of the conflict, shortages of various raw materials, including fuel, had caused production to collapse.

The Dissolution of Austria-Hungary and the Treaty of Saint-Germain-en-Laye between late 1918 and mid 1919 was heavily disruptive to the business, causing scarcity of raw materials, loss of trade relations, mass unemployment, and high inflation that lasted until the latter half of the 1920s. The business slowly reoriented towards civil orders, but the unstable economic situation led to management being cautious and hesitant to make large investments. Typical customers in the early interwar period were ÖMAG, the railways, and hydroelectric power stations (the latter purchasing Andritz's turbines). Various overseas customers also ordered the company's products, including those in Germany, Japan, Persia, and Egypt.

By the end of the 1920s, Maschinenfabrik Andritz had largely recovered. However, in June 1932, the company had to temporarily cease production and almost all employees were laid off due to the wider negative economic consequences of the Great Depression. Production did resume in late 1932 after intervention by the Austrian Government. Accordingly, Andritz continued as a going concern, albeit one that received virtually no investment during this decade. The Gutmann family repeatedly sought to sell the company throughout the 1930s.

=== Anschluss and the Second World War ===
On 2 March 1938, the Anschluss of Austria into Germany's Third Reich took place; thereafter, the ownership of Andritz promptly became a highly politicised matter. Ultimately, on 26 May 1938, the Berlin-based Kämper Motorenwerke took over ownership of the firm from the Gutmanns under an ideologically-impacted transaction. The company benefitted from the economic activity created by Germany's preparation for war as well as from loans issued by the German government. It was during this era that the company became largely focused on the production of diesel compressors.

In 1940, Andritz was sold to Demag, another German company; one year later, German politicians intervened to prevent the factory being closed down. Throughout much of the Second World War, the company was involved in the production of cranes and conveyor belts; other components include grenade casings and howitzer components. Amid the latter half of the conflict, forced labourers were used to produce anti-aircraft gun barrels. At the end of the war, the factory was still fully operational.

=== After the Second World War ===
In 1945, the occupying powers confiscated most of the production facilities as "German property". However, the company management managed to rent used machines and tools from decommissioned companies and resume production of small to medium-sized pumps and turbines. In October 1949, majority ownership of the factory is returned to Wolfgang Gutmann; one year later, Andritz was sold onto Creditnstalt-Bankverein.

In 1949, a long-term co-operation with the Swiss Escher Wyss & Cie. began, initially for water turbines. The product range was completely revised. The manufacture of steam engines and air compressors was discontinued and the company focussed on the production of water turbines, centrifugal pumps, cranes and steel structures. From 1951, complete paper machines were manufactured in co-operation with Escher Wyss AG.

In the 1960s and 1970s, the machine factory continued to grow: the factory buildings were extended, the production facilities modernised and efforts in the field of research intensified. The machine factory produced main cooling pumps for power stations, electrochemical and metallurgical plants. The company was able to significantly increase its turnover and export ratio.

In 1977, the company received the state award and was thus authorised to use the federal coat of arms in its business dealings.

=== Another crisis and reorganisation ===
The second oil crisis in 1979/1980 and the general stagnation of the global economy at the beginning of the 1980s also hit Maschinenfabrik Andritz hard. Orders declined and the company made losses. Liquidation of the company was only prevented by massive state subsidies and rationalisation measures between 1981 and 1985. Among other things, the foundry was closed and the workforce reduced from 2,300 to 1,600. In 1987, the company achieved operating profits again for the first time. In the same year, the German investment company AGIV, based in Frankfurt, acquired a majority stake in Maschinenfabrik Andritz AG.

The company was strategically reorganised from a mere licensee of other machine manufacturers to a leading international supplier of high-tech production systems, independent of external know-how.

The acquisition of Sprout-Bauer, a mechanical engineering company based in Pennsylvania (USA), marked the start of a successful expansion policy. With the purchase of Sprout-Bauer, the Andritz Group expanded its portfolio to include refiners and plants for animal feed production.

Durametal Corporation from Oregon (USA), a manufacturer of refiner plates, was acquired in 1992, Kone Wood, a supplier of woodyard equipment for the pulp industry, in 1994 and Jesma-Matador A/S from Denmark for the animal feed sector in 1995. With the reorientation towards becoming an international supplier of complete solutions, the name also changed from Maschinenfabrik Andritz AG (MFA for short) to "Andritz AG" in the mid-1990s.

At the beginning of 1998, Andritz acquired a majority stake in Sundwiger Eisenhütte Maschinenfabrik GmbH & Co. (now Andritz Sundwig), based in Hemer (North Rhine-Westphalia), and in 2000 a half share in the Ahlström Machinery Group, Finland.

In addition to the numerous acquisitions, the ownership structure also changed: In 1999, ‘AGIV’ sold its stake to a consortium consisting of the Carlyle Group, GE Capital, Unternehmensinvest AG, Deutsche Beteiligungs AG and the Custos Private Foundation founded by Wolfgang Leitner.

=== IPO and further acquisitions ===
In June 2001, Andritz successfully placed two million new shares on the Vienna Stock Exchange. With the fresh capital, Andritz was able to make further complementary acquisitions in addition to the purchase of the remaining 50% of Ahlstrom: With the purchase of the pulp and paper dryer business from Asea Brown Boveri in 2002, the company was for the first time able to offer the complete process line for pulp production systems, from the woodyard to the finished pulp bale. In the same year, Andritz also became a full-range supplier in the field of continuous hot-dip galvanising systems with the acquisition of a part of the American SELAS Corp.

In June 2003, around 6.1 million shares from the holdings of financial investors (Unternehmens Invest AG, Carlyle Group, Deutsche Beteiligungs AG, GE Capital) were issued to private and institutional investors as part of the secondary public offering on the stock exchange. In the same year, IDEAS Simulation Inc. and Acutest Oy were acquired to further strengthen the pulp and paper division.

In September 2003, Heinrich Fiedler GmbH & Co. KG in Regensburg (screen baskets) was acquired in September 2003, Bird Machine, USA (centrifuges, chamber filter presses) and parts of Netzsch in Selb, Bavaria (dewatering units, chamber filter presses), Otto Kaiser in Bretten, Baden-Württemberg (mechanical high-performance presses) and VA Tech WABAG (fluidised bed drying systems) in 2004. In June 2004, a joint venture, European Mill Service GmbH (EMS), was founded with the industrial service provider Rheinhold & Mahla AG. In June 2006, Andritz AG took over the hydropower division VA Tech Hydro GmbH, formerly VA Tech. In 2008, a division of März-Gautschi Industrieofenanlagen GmbH was acquired. In 2010, Krauss-Maffei centrifuges were added to the product range with the acquisition of centrifuge specialist KMPT AG, Germany. In 2010, Andritz entered the rapidly growing market for plastic film production with the acquisition of DMT Technology, Austria. The company, which operates under the name Andritz Biax, is a supplier of systems for the production of plastic films.

With the acquisition of AE&E Austria at the beginning of 2011, Andritz is able to further strengthen its offering in the fields of power generation (steam boiler systems) and environmental technology (flue gas cleaning systems). In 2013, the acquisition of the German press manufacturer Schuler in Göppingen, Germany, the global market leader in metal forming technology, is the largest acquisition in the company's history to date.

In July 2021, Joachim Schönbeck was appointed as Wolfgang Leitner's successor as CEO of Andritz AG from April 2022; Leitner subsequently moved to the Supervisory Board.

=== Highlights in Andritz's history, including major acquisitions ===
In 1852, the company was founded by Hungarian-born Josef Körösi as an iron foundry in Andritz, a suburb of the city of Graz in Austria. Soon after its foundation, the company's production program was extended to include large capital goods, such as cranes, pumps, water turbines, and later also bridges, steam boilers and engines, as well as mining equipment.

In 1949, Andritz began a lasting cooperation with the Escher Wyss Group of Switzerland, initially in the water turbines sector.

In 1951, Andritz began the production of complete paper machines in cooperation with Escher Wyss.

During the 1960s and 1970s, Andritz continued to grow. The production shops were extended, new machines purchased, and research and development activities intensified. Electrochemical and metallurgical equipment were added to the production program.

In 1987, Andritz began to change its strategic direction, from being a licensee of other equipment manufacturers to an international supplier of its own high-tech production systems.

In 1990, the acquisition of Sprout-Bauer, a US company supplying equipment for mechanical pulp and animal feed production, marked the beginning of the group's expansion policy through acquisitions.

=== 2000–2021 ===
In March 2000, the company acquired a 50 percent stake in Finland's Ahlstrom Machinery Group from the A. Ahlstrom, a manufacturer of chemical pulp plants and other pulp processing machinery. As part of the purchase agreement, Andritz also received the option of purchasing full control of Ahlstrom Machinery in the event of Andritz going public. In the meantime, Ahlstrom Machinery was renamed Andritz-Ahlstrom and placed under Andritz's Pulp and Paper division.

In 2001, Andritz went public on the Vienna Stock Exchange. Two million new shares were placed successfully with national and international investors.

Following the IPO, Andritz completed its full acquisition of Andritz-Ahlstrom, buying the rest of that subsidiary in July 2001. This was one of the largest acquisitions Andritz has made, and it made Andritz one of the largest suppliers of pulp production systems worldwide.

In 2006, with the acquisition of VA TECH HYDRO, Andritz grew to become one of the largest supplier of electromechanical equipment for hydropower plants in the world.

Andritz acquired AE&E Austria in 2011, Schuler GmbH (leading German metalforming company) in 2013, and Herr-Voss Stamco Inc. (leading US supplier of coil processing equipment and services for the metals industry) in 2014.

In 2018, the acquisition of Diatec completed the portfolio in hygiene papers, and Andritz also acquired Xerium Technologies a global manufacturer and supplier of machine clothing (forming fabrics, press felts, drying fabrics and roll covers for paper, tissue, and board machines) in 2018.

In 2021, Andritz acquired Laroche, a supplier of fiber processing technologies, and parts of Air Quality Control System (AQCS) business from GE Steam Power.

=== Andritz Hydro Group ===
Another large acquisition of Andritz was the purchase of the hydroelectric power division of VA Technologie in 2006, as a consequence of a decision of the European Commission in the acquisition of VA Technologie by Siemens. Experts estimated the price at €200 million. The VA Tech Hydro unit changed its name to Andritz VA Tech Hydro GmbH and became a subsidiary of Andritz AG. With 3000 employees and sales of €620 million, the unit increased the size of Andritz by one third, becoming the company's second-largest business.

In May and June 2008, Andritz acquired hydropower technology and certain assets of GE Energy's hydropower business (including test laboratories in Canada and Brazil), as well as GE Energy's majority interest in the joint venture GE Hydro Inepar do Brasil. Since January 2009, all these acquisitions now operate under "Andritz Hydro" name. Andritz Hydro ranks among the 3 largest hydro companies (with Alstom and Voith-Siemens) with historical references back from 19th century by the acquisition over the years of the following companies and technologies, on which the Andritz Hydro group is the legal successor:

- ACM – Vevey, Switzerland
- AFI, Canada
- Baldwin-Lima-Hamilton, United States
- Bell, Switzerland
- Bouvier, France
- Bouvier-Darling, United States
- Charmilles, Switzerland
- Dominion Engineering Works, Canada
- Dominion Bridge, Canada
- Escher Wyss & Cie, Switzerland
- Ge Hydro, Canada
- Hemi Controls, Canada
- I.P.Morris, United States
- KMPT Ag, Germany
- KMW, Sweden
- Lorenzo Avila, Brazil
- Pedro Molinari, Brazil
- Nohab, Sweden
- Pelton Waterwheel, United States
- Sulzer Hydro, United States
- Tampella, Finland
- Voest-Alpine Maschinenbau Gmbh, Austria
- Voest-Alpine Ag, Austria
- Voest-Alpine Mce, Austria
- Va Tech Voest Mce, Austria
- Va Tech Escher Wyss, Germany
- Va Tech Escher Wyss, Italy
- Va Tech Escher Wyss, Spain
- Va Tech Hydro, Switzerland
- Va Tech Bouvier Hydro, France
- Va Tech Hydro, Canada
- Va Tech Escher Wyss, Mexico
- Va Tech Hidro, Brazil
- Va Tech Hydro Usa Corporation
- Va Tech Hydro, Indonesia
- Va Tech Hydro Flovel, India
- Va Tech Hydro, China
- Waplans, Sweden

== Company ==
Andritz AG is a listed stock corporation with various international subsidiaries. Since January 2024, the Group's business activities have been divided into four independent business areas:

1. Andritz Hydro Power (electromechanical equipment for hydropower plants),
2. Andritz Pulp & Paper (plants for the production of pulp),
3. Andritz Environment & Energy (H2 Electrolyzer and Renewable Fuels, Carbon Capture and Air Pollution Control, technologies for solid-liquid separation and feed),
4. Andritz Metals (plants for the production and processing of cold-rolled carbon steel, stainless steel and aluminium strip as well as presses).

== Criticism ==
In April 2022, Andritz announced the suspension of all new business in Russia due to the ongoing war in Ukraine and the resulting international sanctions. Despite this suspension, the company continues to operate its existing facilities in Russia, including its representative office in Moscow, which offers mechanical and thermal separation technologies and services for various industries.
