= Mark Rocket =

New Zealand aerospace entrepreneur

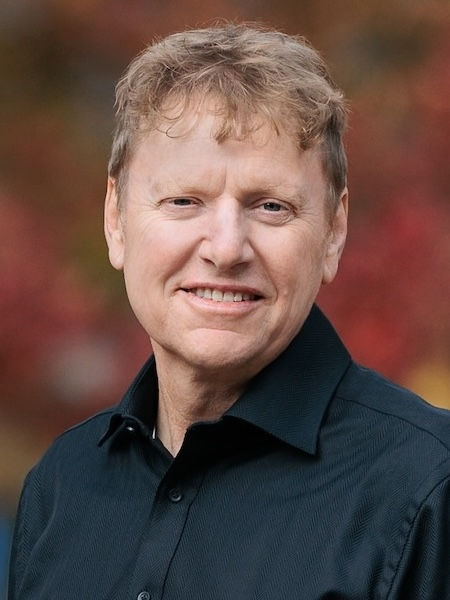
- Rocket in 2025
- Born: Mark Stevens
- Citizenship: New Zealand
- Occupations: Entrepreneur, aerospace executive
- Known for: Founder of Kea Aerospace, seed investor in Rocket Lab
- Title: CEO of Kea Aerospace

Mark Rocket (né Stevens) is a New Zealand entrepreneur, aerospace executive, and the founder and CEO of Kea Aerospace. He was a seed investor and co-director of Rocket Lab from 2007 to 2011. Rocket became the first New Zealander to reach space through a suborbital flight with Blue Origin on the New Shepard NS-32 mission in 2025.

== Career ==
Rocket founded two Internet companies in 1998 and sold one in 2006. He was a seed investor in Rocket Lab and served as a co-director from 2007 to 2011. In 2018, he founded Kea Aerospace, a company developing solar-powered stratospheric aircraft, and serves as its CEO. As of 2025, Rocket is the president of Aerospace New Zealand.

== Personal life ==
Rocket changed his surname from Stevens to Rocket in 2000. That year, he set a personal goal to become the first New Zealander to reach space. In 2006, he purchased a ticket for a 2008 Virgin Galactic flight, which was expected to take him to space, but he sold the ticket after delays. In 2025, Rocket secured a seat on Blue Origin's New Shepard NS-32 suborbital flight, which flew on 1 June 2025, making him the first New Zealander to reach space.
