= Confederação Geral dos Trabalhadores =

CGT
- General Confederation of Workers
- Confederação Geral dos Trabalhadores
- Founded: March 23, 1986
- Headquarters: São Paulo, Brazil
- Location: Brazil
- Key people: Canindé Pegado, general secretary
- Affiliations: ITUC, ORIT
- Website: www.cgt.org.br

The Confederação Geral dos Trabalhadores (General Confederation of Workers, CGT) is the second-largest federation of labor unions in Brazil. Founded in 1986, the CGT is close to the centrist Party of the Brazilian Democratic Movement (PMDB).
