= Deutsche Beteiligungs =

Deutsche Beteiligungs AG
- Type: Aktiengesellschaft
- ISIN: DE000A1TNUT7
- Industry: Private Equity
- Founded: 1965; 61 years ago
- Headquarters: Frankfurt, Germany
- Revenue: €24.7 million (2025)
- Number of employees: 121 (2025)
- Website: www.dbag.com

Deutsche Beteiligungs AG (DBAG) is a publicly listed German investment company based in Frankfurt am Main. It manages private equity funds and invests in mid-market companies (Mittelstand) in Germany, Austria and Switzerland (the “DACH” region), and especially on well-positioned companies offering growth potential. DBAG’s sector focus is on manufacturers, industrial service providers and IndustryTech enterprises – businesses whose products facilitate automation, robotics and digitalisation – as well as on companies from the business services, IT services, software, healthcare, and environment, energy and infrastructure sectors. The assets managed or advised by the DBAG Group amounted to EUR 2.7 billion as of 2025. Since 2020, DBAG has been present on the Italian market, providing its services from its office in Milan since 2021. DBAG Group’s assets under management or advisory amount to approximately 2.7 billion euros. ELF Capital has expanded DBAG’s range of flexible financing solutions for mid-market companies to include private debt.

== History ==
The company was founded in 1965 as Deutsche Beteiligungsgesellschaft mbH and is, according to its information, the oldest company in the private equity sector in Germany. Deutsche Beteiligungs AG was founded in 1984 by Deutsche Bank and Schmidtbank from Hof (Saale) and was managed by Deutsche Beteiligungsgesellschaft mbH. Deutsche Beteiligungs AG went public with an IPO on the Frankfurt Stock Exchange in 1985.

== Shareholders ==
(As of February 2023)

%	Shareholder
28,61	Rossmann Beteiligungs GmbH
10,00	Ricardo Portabella Peralta
61,39	Free float
