= Wolfgang Leitner =

Austrian billionaire and CEO

- Born: 27 March 1953 (age 73)
- Education: University of Graz
- Title: CEO, Andritz AG
- Term: 1994-2022
- Children: 2

Wolfgang Leitner (born 27 March 1953) is an Austrian billionaire and former CEO of Andritz AG, an Austrian plant engineering company.

== Early life ==
Leitner was born in 1953 in Graz, Austria. His father was a metal worker at Andritz AG. In 1978, Leitner received a doctorate in chemistry from the University of Graz.

== Career ==
After university Leitner worked in research for Vianova, an Austrian subsidiary of Hoechst AG. In 1981, he started working as a management consultant for McKinsey. In 1986, he founded the pharmaceutical company Genericon Pharma together with his former classmate Martin Bartenstein, who would later become a mininister in the Austrian government. Genericon Pharma's Hungarian subsidiary Pharmavit achieved great success with effervescent tablets and generic drugs. In 1995, the company was bought by the US pharmaceutical group Bristol Myers Squibb for US$110 million.

Leitner joined Andritz AG as chief financial officer in 1987. In 1994, he became chief executive officer. In 1999, when Andritz AG was sold, Leitner acquired a 26 percent stake. In July 2021, Joachim Schönbeck was appointed as Leitner's successor as CEO of Andritz AG starting in April 2022. Leitner subsequently moved to the supervisory board.

== Private life ==
Leitner is married, with two children, and lives in Graz, Austria.

Leitner made the 2024 Forbes Billionaires List with an estimated wealth of US$2.7 billion, the sixth richest in Austria and 1238th richest person in the world.

== Honours ==
- 2006: "Man of the Year" by Austrian business magazine Trend
- 2015: Honorary Senator of the Graz University of Technology
- 2022: Erzherzog-Johann-Award
