= Schuler Group =

German engineering company

Andritz Schuler GmbH
- Type: Gesellschaft mit beschränkter Haftung (Deutschland)
- Industry: Mechanical engineering
- Predecessor: Müller Weingarten
- Founded: 1839
- Headquarters: Göppingen, Germany
- Key people: Martin Drasch, Chief Executive Officer; Peter Jost, Chief Operating Officer; Thomas Kamphausen, Chief Financial Officer; Joachim Schönbeck, Chairman of the Supervisory Board
- Revenue: €1.2121 billion (2018)
- Number of employees: 6,617 (December 31, 2016)
- Website: www.schulergroup.com

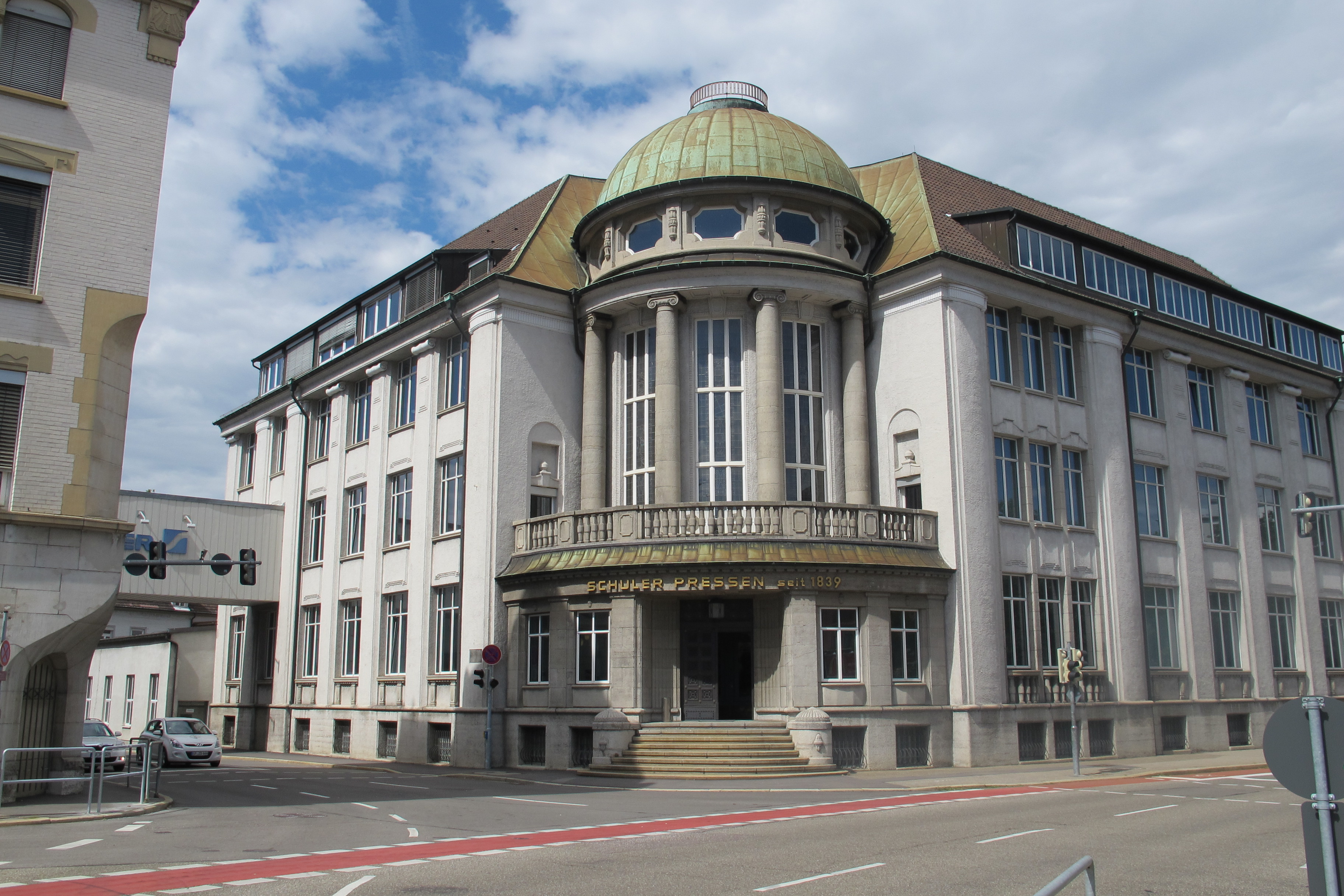
Andritz Schuler GmbH’s headquarters in Göppingen, Germany

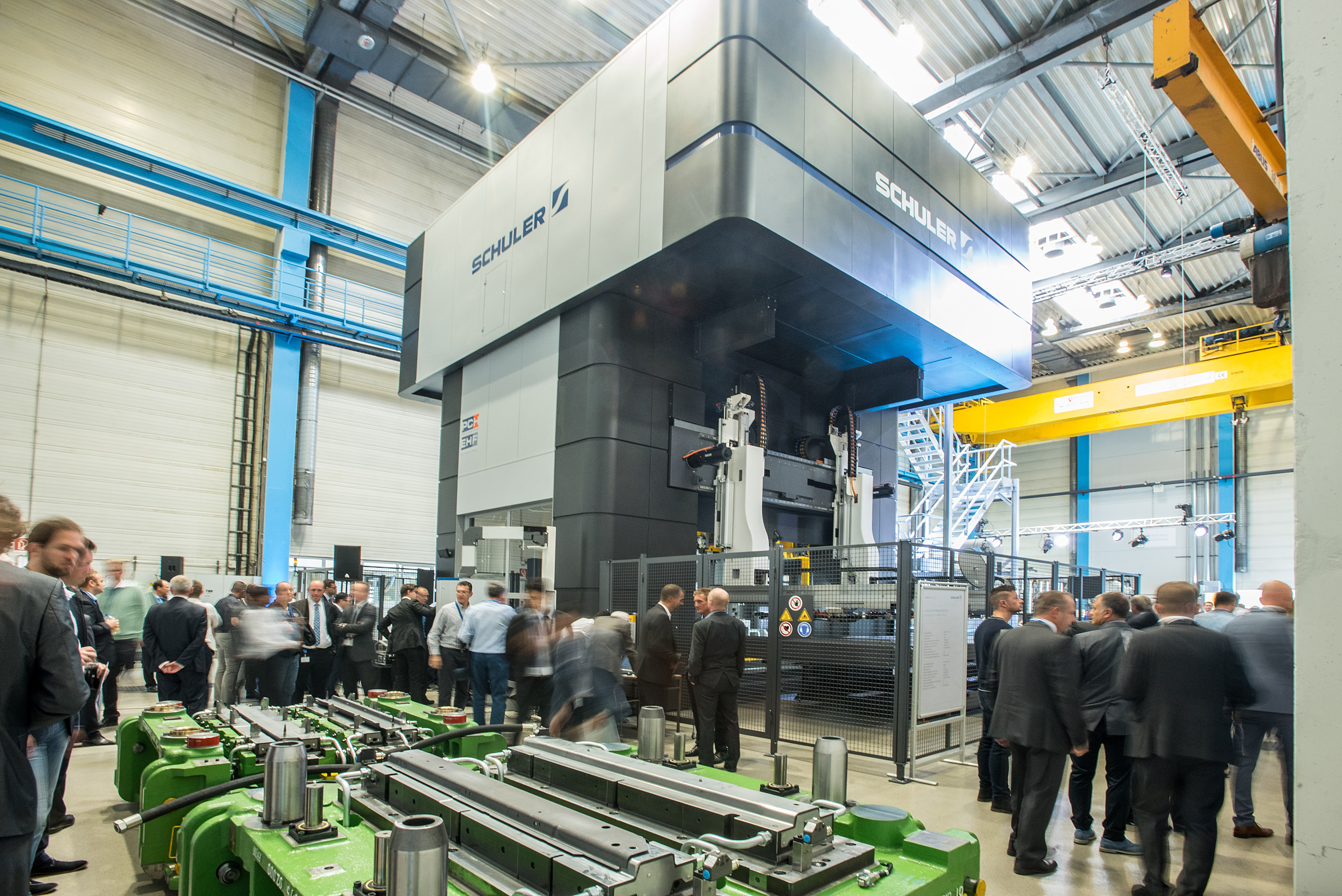
Hot Stamping TechCenter in Göppingen, Germany

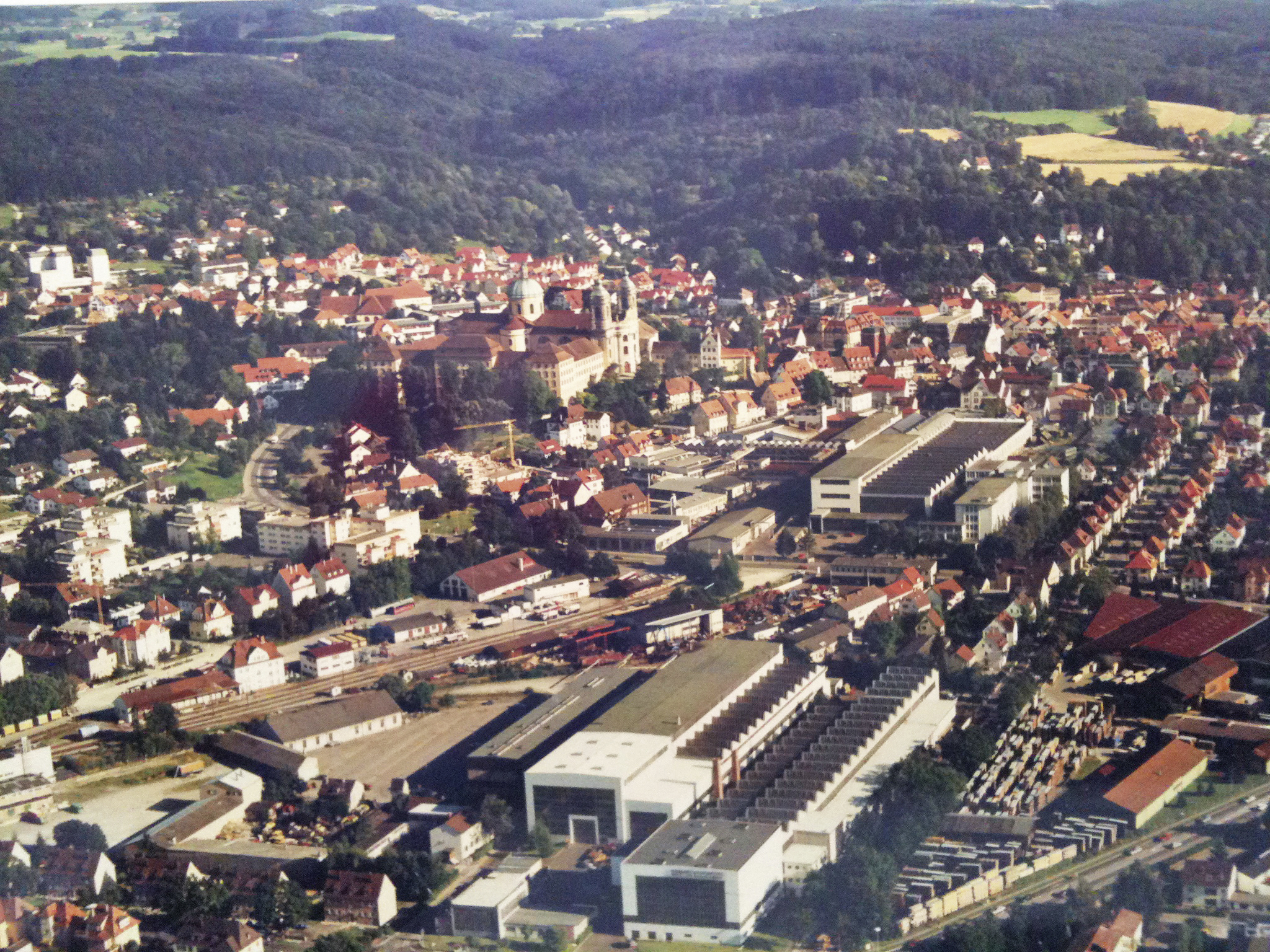
Factory premises in Weingarten, Germany

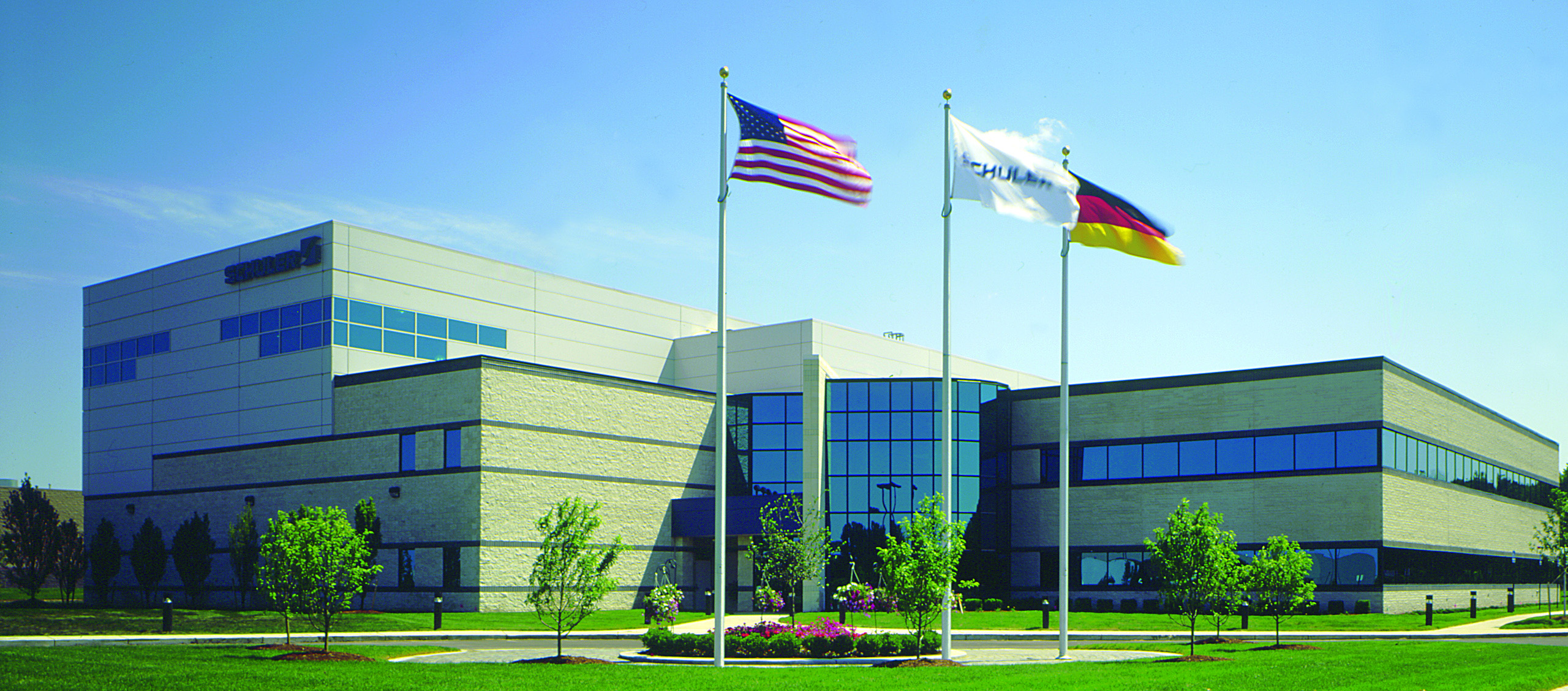
Schuler Inc. based in Canton, Michigan

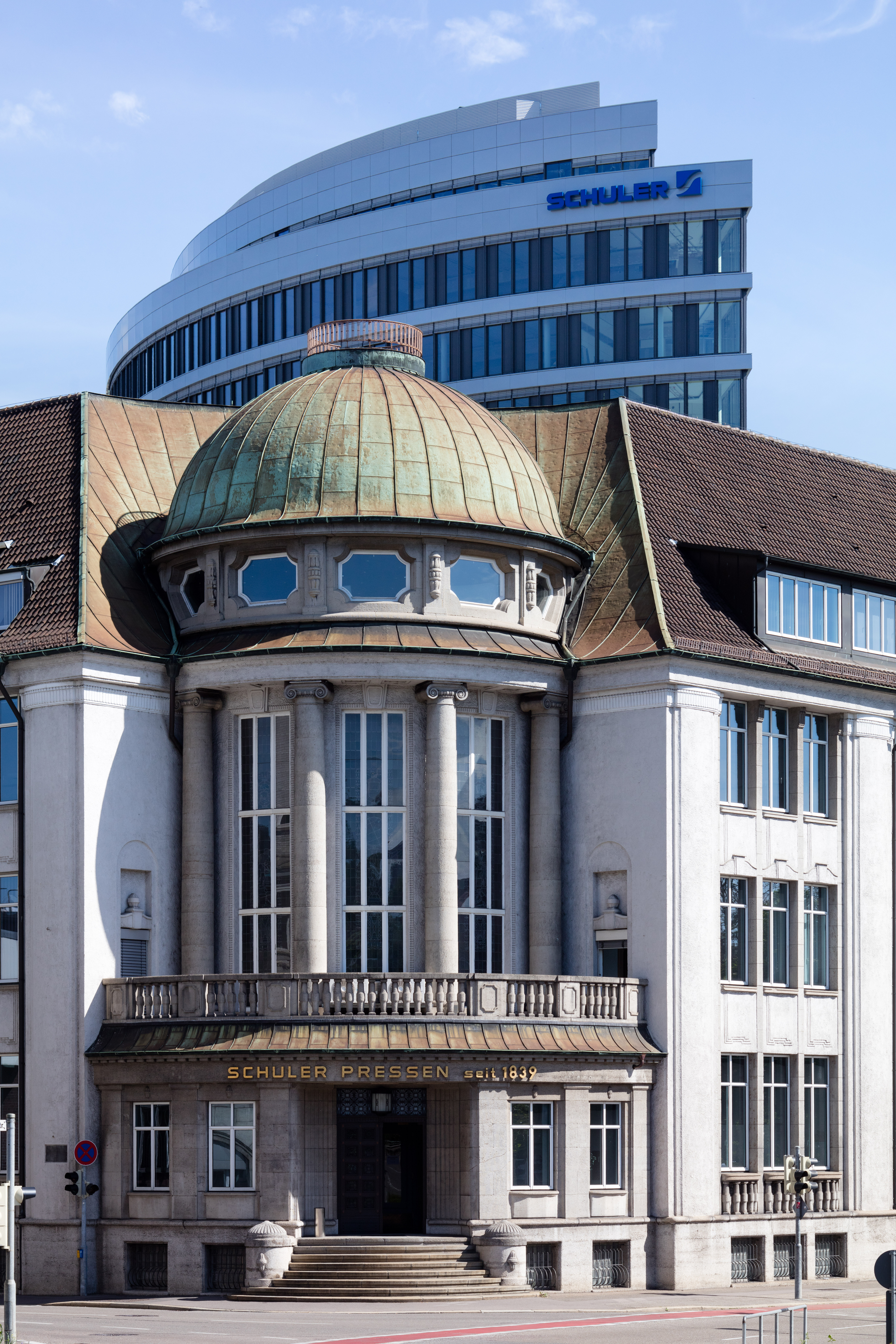
Schuler Innovation Tower at headquarters in Göppingen, Germany

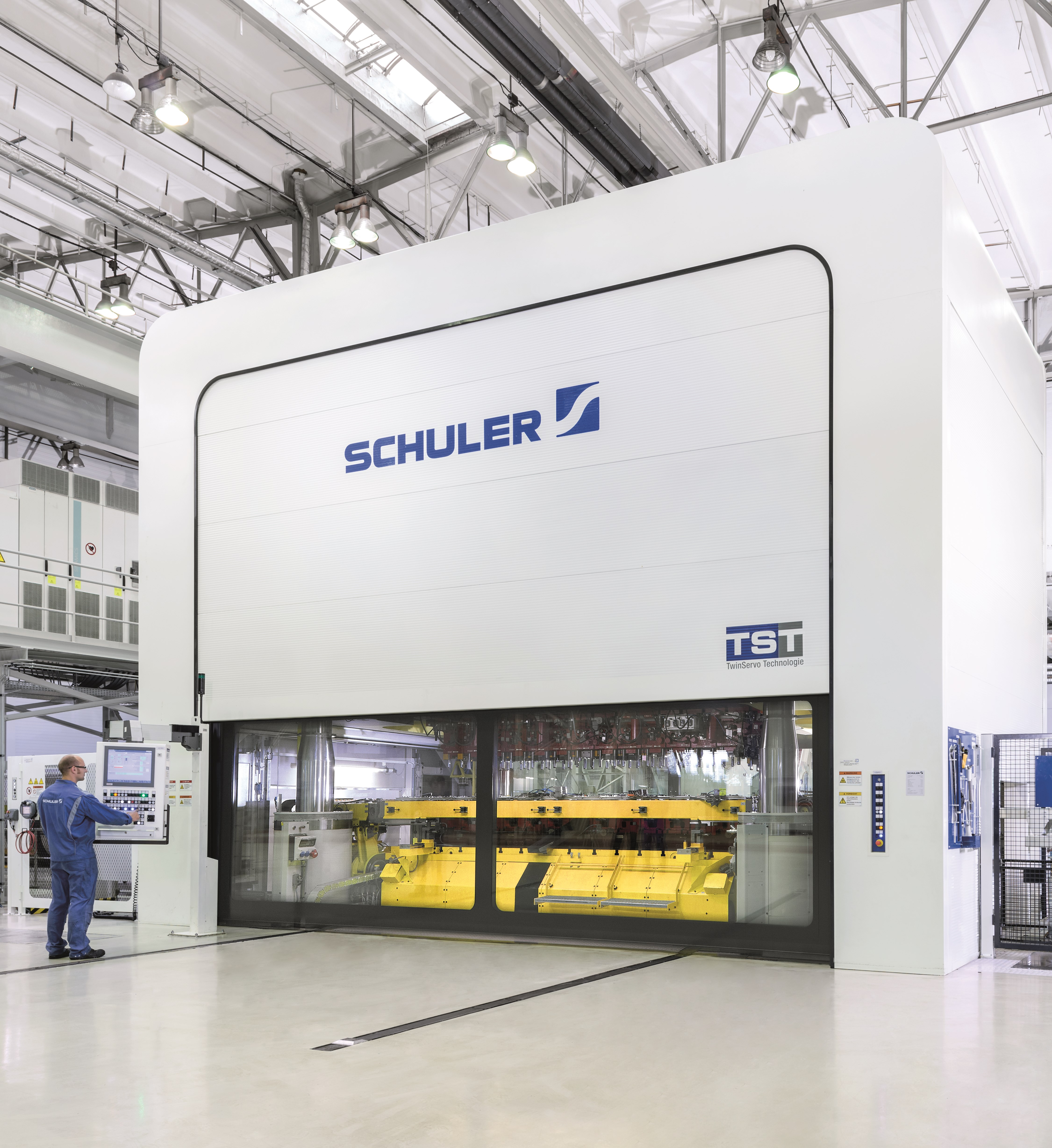
Transfer press at the Erfurt site

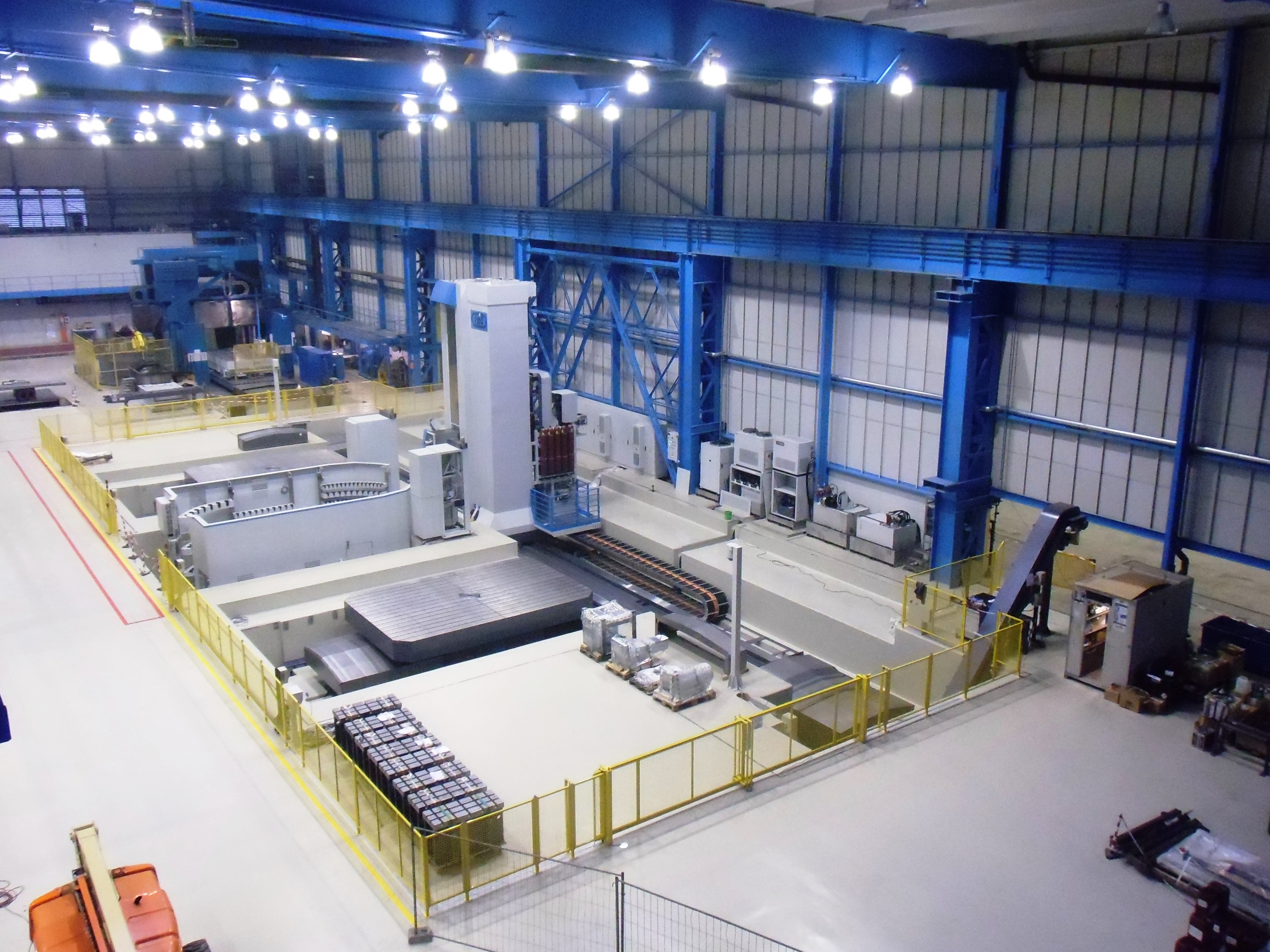
Large boring machine for the processing of press parts weighing up to 120 tons

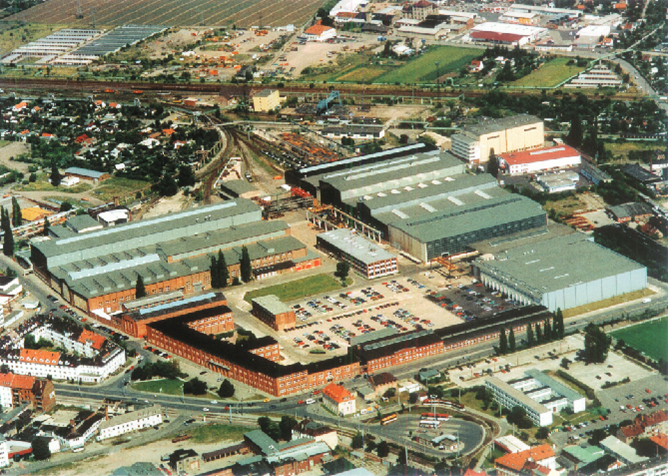
Aerial photo of the location at Schwerborner Straße

Andritz Schuler GmbH is a German company headquartered in Göppingen, Baden-Württemberg which operates in the field of forming technology and is the world's largest manufacturer of presses. The presses are used to create car body sheets and other car parts as well as items such as beverage and aerosol cans, coins, sinks, large pipes, and parts for electric motors.

The company has production sites in Germany, Switzerland, Brazil, USA and China and in addition to the automotive industry and its suppliers, it also supplies the household appliances and electrical industry, the forging, energy, aerospace and railway industries as well as mints. In total, the company has a presence in 40 countries with its own sites and representatives.

As of December 31, 2016, the company employed 6,617 people and in the 2016 fiscal year, it achieved a turnover of €1.2 billion. Earnings before interest and taxes (EBIT) grew in 2015 to €95.4 million, the Group result was €77.4 million.

Schuler AG's shares were listed on the regulated market on the Frankfurt and Stuttgart stock exchanges. When the public float portion fell below 10% in 2012, Schuler fell off the SDAX share index. In 2014 the shares were delisted from the regulated stock exchange; today, the shares are only listed on the open market on the Munich stock exchange.

In 2025, Schuler announced that it will operate under the name Andritz Schuler in future.

== History ==
The company was founded by Louis Schuler in 1839 and produced the first sheet metal forming machines in 1852. In 1895, the first minting presses were exported to China. Schuler presented the world's first transfer press at the Exposition Universelle fair in Paris in 1900. In 1924, the first body panel press for mass production was delivered. Internationalization began in 1961. In 1999, Schuler went public and entered the field of laser technology with the acquisition of Held Lasertechnik in Dietzenbach, Germany. In 2007, Schuler acquired Müller Weingarten AG, which also included the company Umformtechnik Erfurt, along with others. This acquisition created a global leading provider of forming technology for metal processing with a market share of around 35 percent.

In the same year, Schuler launched its ServoDirect Technology for presses, which has now become the industry standard. It was followed by the TwinServo Technology in 2014.

A double-lever deep-drawing press manufactured by Schuler dating from 1928 was retained at the Automobilwerk Eisenach, and is exhibited outside the Automobile Welt museum in Eisenach as a technical monument, after having been in operation there until 1998.

When the public float portion fell below 10% in 2012, Schuler fell off the SDAX share index.

In May 2012, Austrian company Andritz AG acquired 38.5% of the shares in Schuler AG from the Schuler-Voith family, and made the shareholders an offer of €20 per share. As of February 15, 2013, Andritz reported a stake of 93.57 percent, after the competition authorities had given their approval for the acquisition.

In spring 2014, the Schuler AG Executive Board decided to apply for the Schuler AG shares to be delisted.

In 2017, the Schuler Innovation Tower at the Göppingen headquarters was officially opened.

As part of the sponsoring activities, Schuler supports projects in the field of science, research, education, social affairs and good citizenship at the various locations. The Louis Schuler Fund for Education and Science, for instance, is assigned the task of providing support for trainees and educational institutions in the field of technology.

Since April 2019, Porsche and Schuler have been building a joint press shop on a 13-hectare site in Star Park near Halle (Saale). The production of body parts began there in June 2021.

In July 2019, Schuler announced that it would cut 500 jobs in Germany. Production in Göppingen is to be completely discontinued and production in China and Brazil expanded instead.

In November 2021, the operational parts of Schuler AG were transferred to the newly founded Schuler Group GmbH. Schuler AG continues to exist as a pure financial holding company, but is limited to holding investments; in December 2021, the name and legal form were changed to Andritz Deutschland Holding GmbH.

In September 2024, it was announced that a total of 474 jobs would be cut across Germany and that the Weingarten site would be closed.
