= Andritz (Graz) =

Coordinates: 47°6′20″N 15°25′23″E

- 12th city district of Graz
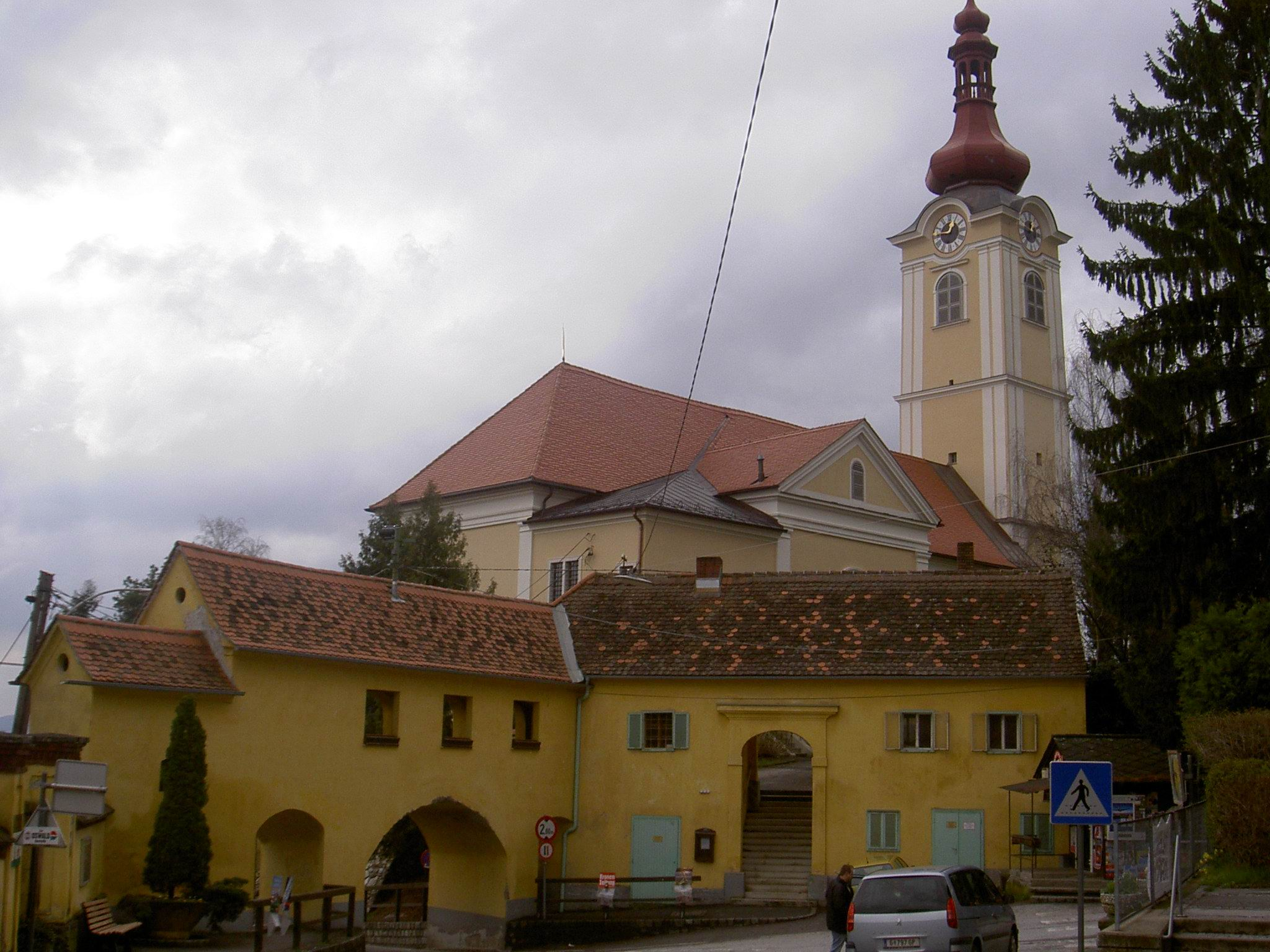
- Saint Veit Church
- Interactive map of Andritz
- Country: Austria
- Province: Styria
- Statutory city: Graz

Area
  - Total: 18.47 km^{2} (7.13 sq mi)

Population (2023)
  - Total: 19,415
  - Density: 1,051/km^{2} (2,723/sq mi)
- Postal code: 8010, 8042-8046 and 8054

Andritz (Slovene: Jendrica – "fast-flowing water"; German: [ˈan.dtrit͡s]) is the 12th district of Graz. It is located in the extreme north of the city. It has a population of 19.415 (January 2023) and an area of 18.47 square kilometres. The postal codes of Andritz are 8010, 8042-8046 and 8054.

== History ==
The name Andritz was first mentioned in 1265.

Andritz's most important industry, the technology company Andritz AG, was established by Josef Körösi in 1852. The largest of its endeavors, a pulp mill, was bought by them in 1913 but which had been in existence since 1790. The company as of 2009 has 13,176 employees.

Andritz was a separate municipality until 1938, when it merged with the southern part of Weinitzen and joined Graz. The current district boundaries were set in 1946.

== Points of interest ==
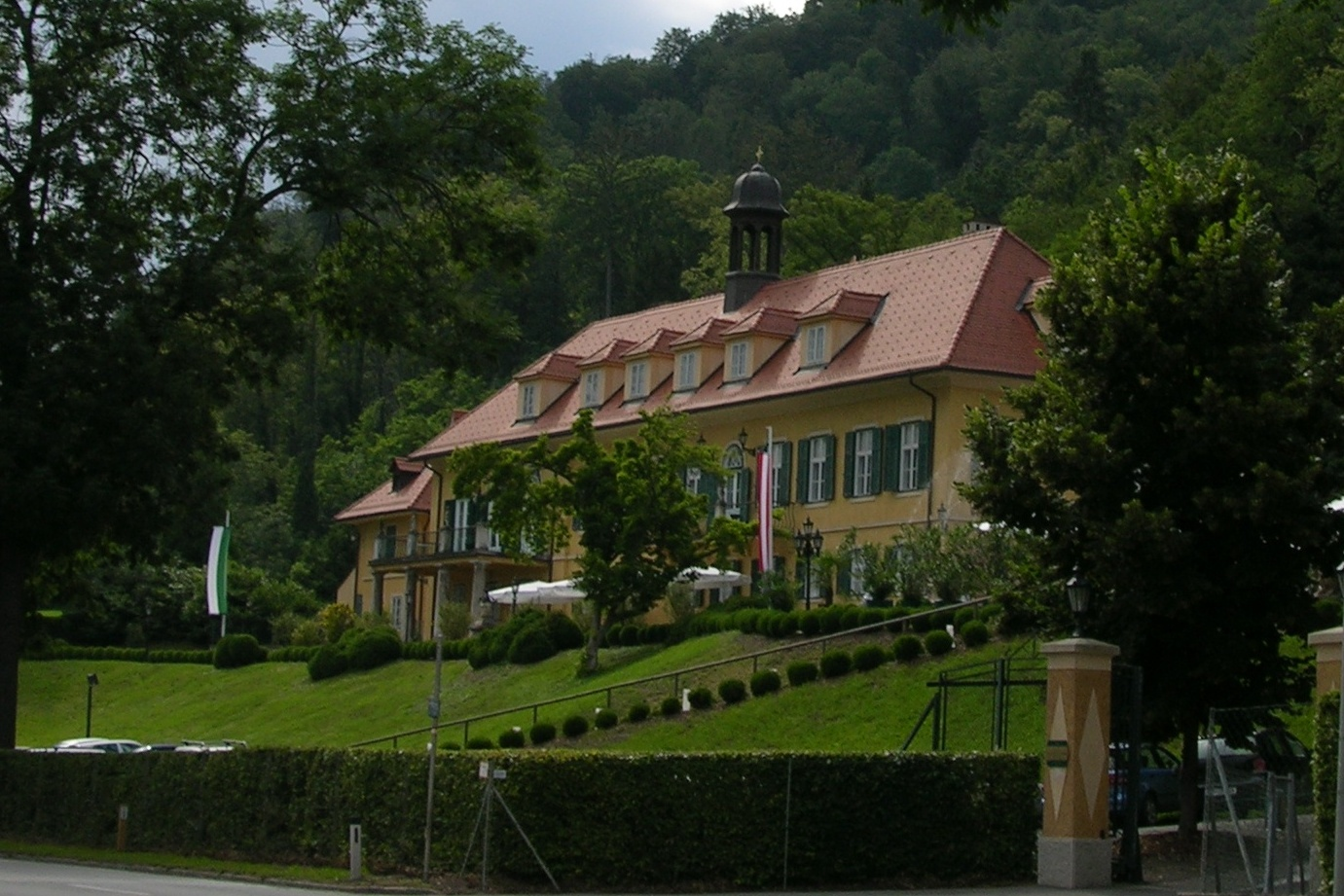
Chateau St. Veit (2008) also known as Chateau St. Gotthard.

- Church St. Veit
- Chateau St. Gotthard
- Chapel of St. Ulrich

== Economy ==
- Andritz AG (former "Maschinenfabrik Andritz")
