= Djalma Bom =

Brazilian politician

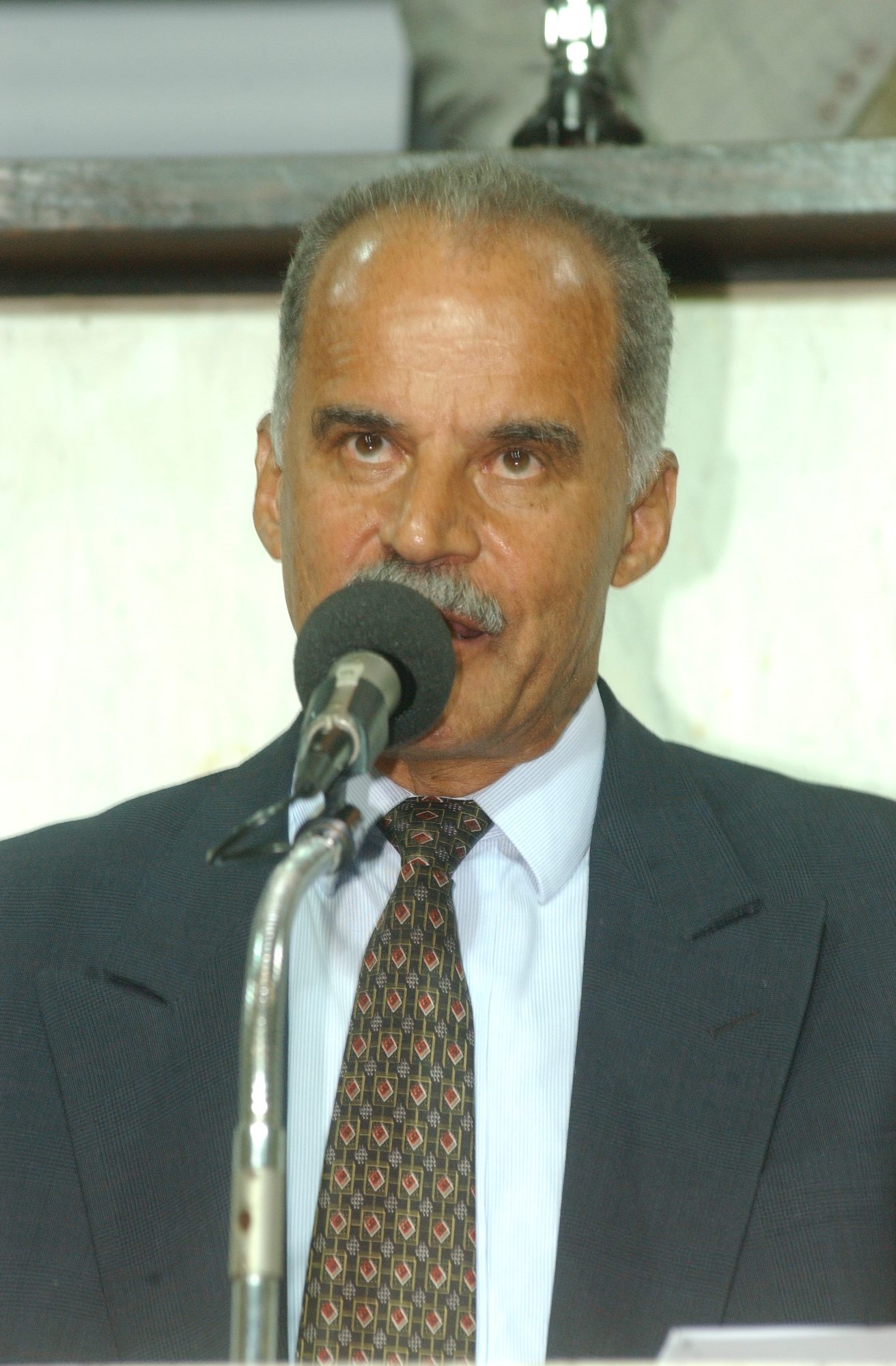
Bom in 2003

Djalma Bom (born March 29, 1939) is a Brazilian former politician and a founding member of the country's Workers' Party, the party of former president Luiz Inácio Lula da Silva.

In 1978, Bom joined the board of the Steel Worker's Union with Luiz Inácio Lula da Silva then on the road to become an important leader. Together they organized major activities including strikes. These strikes were not seen under favourable light by the military government and the Union main board was jailed for a month in May 1980.

In early 1982 a group of academics, union leaders such as Lula and Bom, and intellectuals founded the Workers' Party, a left-wing party created during the military dictatorship and, in the upcoming elections in November, Bom was elected to a seat in Congress in Brasília. In 1988, he became the Vice-Mayor of São Bernardo do Campo.

He was re-elected in 1994 to the Legislative Assembly in São Paulo, and retired after this tenure.

== Marriage and family ==
Idalina Rodrigues Mantovani (1940–2011) was introduced to Djalma Bom by his sisters. After three years dating, the couple got married on December 19, 1964.

They bought a house in São Bernardo do Campo. In September 1965 their first son Douglas was born followed by the birth of their daughter Mara in 1968. The Bom family settled for a quiet life: he went to work at Mercedes-Benz while she stayed at home with the small children. But soon their life would change as Bom became a member of the board of the Steel Worker's Union in 1978 together with Luiz Inácio Lula da Silva then on the road to become an important leader.

== Political life ==
In the late 1970s, Lula, Bom and other leaders helped organize major union activities including huge strikes. These strikes were not seen under favorable light by the military government and they were jailed for a month in May 1980.

In 1982 a group of academics, union leaders such as Lula and Bom, and intellectuals, founded the Partido dos Trabalhadores (PT) or Workers' Party, a left-wing party with progressive ideas created in the midst of the military dictatorship.

Around this period, Idalina then a shy housewife, emerged as an outspoken and supportive wife helping her husband through good and bad times and also during the campaigns. In the elections of 1982, Bom was elected with 165,000 votes for a seat in Congress in Brasília and in 1988, he became the Vice-Mayor of São Bernardo do Campo.

Though she helped her husband attending social functions and foreign trips (Cuba and Nicaragua in 1984) the couple's relations began deteriorating and they separated in 1989. One of her last appearances before leaving the political arena was during the ceremony in which Bom was to take over the office of Mayor of City for a brief time. He would be elected again in 1994 for the Legislative Assembly in São Paulo and retire after this tenure.

After the separation, Idalina decided to pursue her own interests: she furthered her education and received a University degree in 1993 in pedagogy; she taught during sometime and worked with underprivileged children before retiring.

Admired and respected by the local people in the city for her work, courage and dignity, mainly during the years of oppression, she no longer took part in political events. She died of cancer.
